= List of preserved steam locomotives in Croatia =

This is a list of preserved steam locomotives on the territory of Croatia.

== Locomotives ==
=== Italian era ===
==== FS 835.040 ====
- Location: outside of the Pula railway station
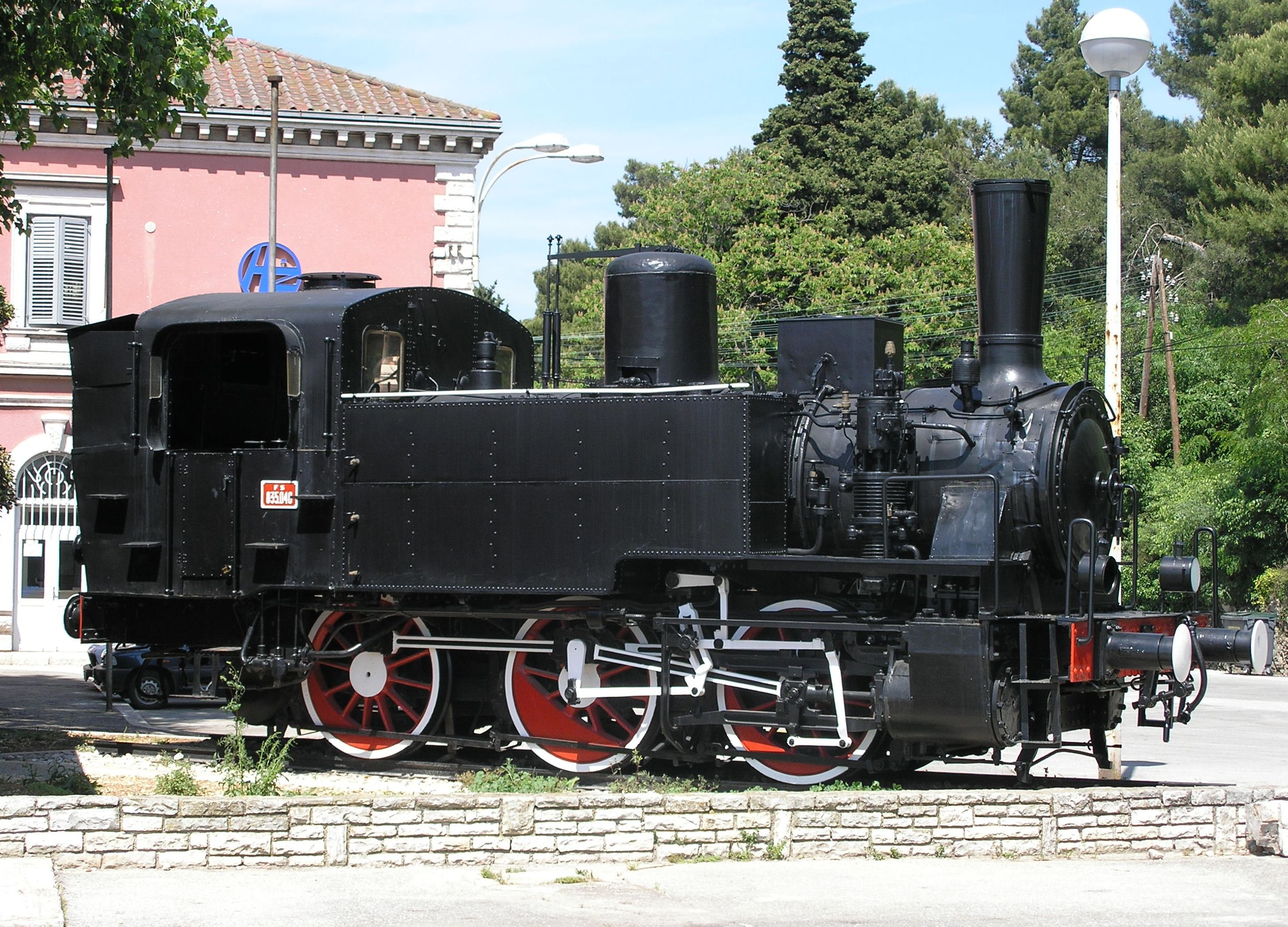

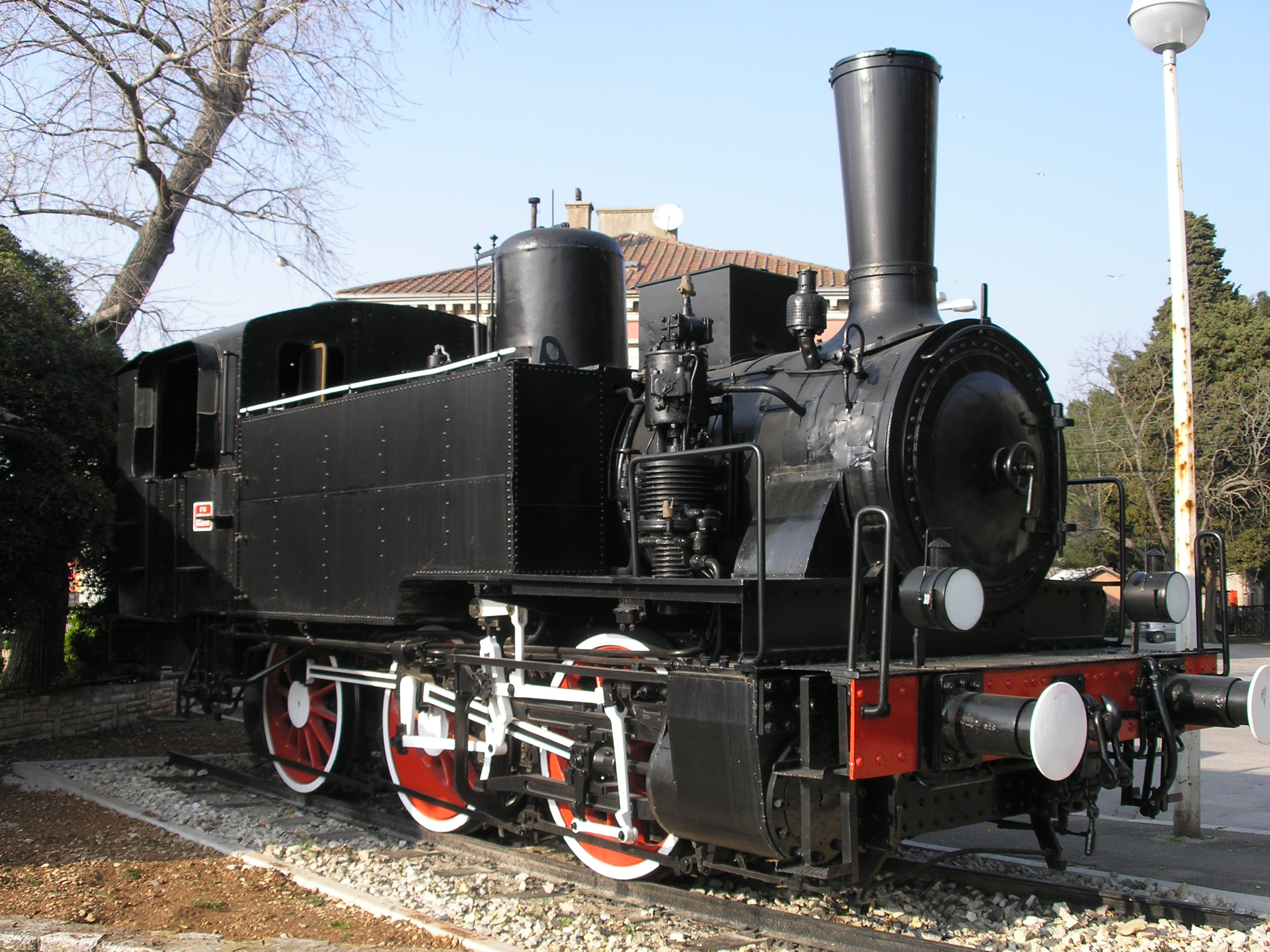

=== Yugoslav era ===
==== JŽ 11-015 ====
- Location: Croatian Railway Museum in Zagreb (HŽM)
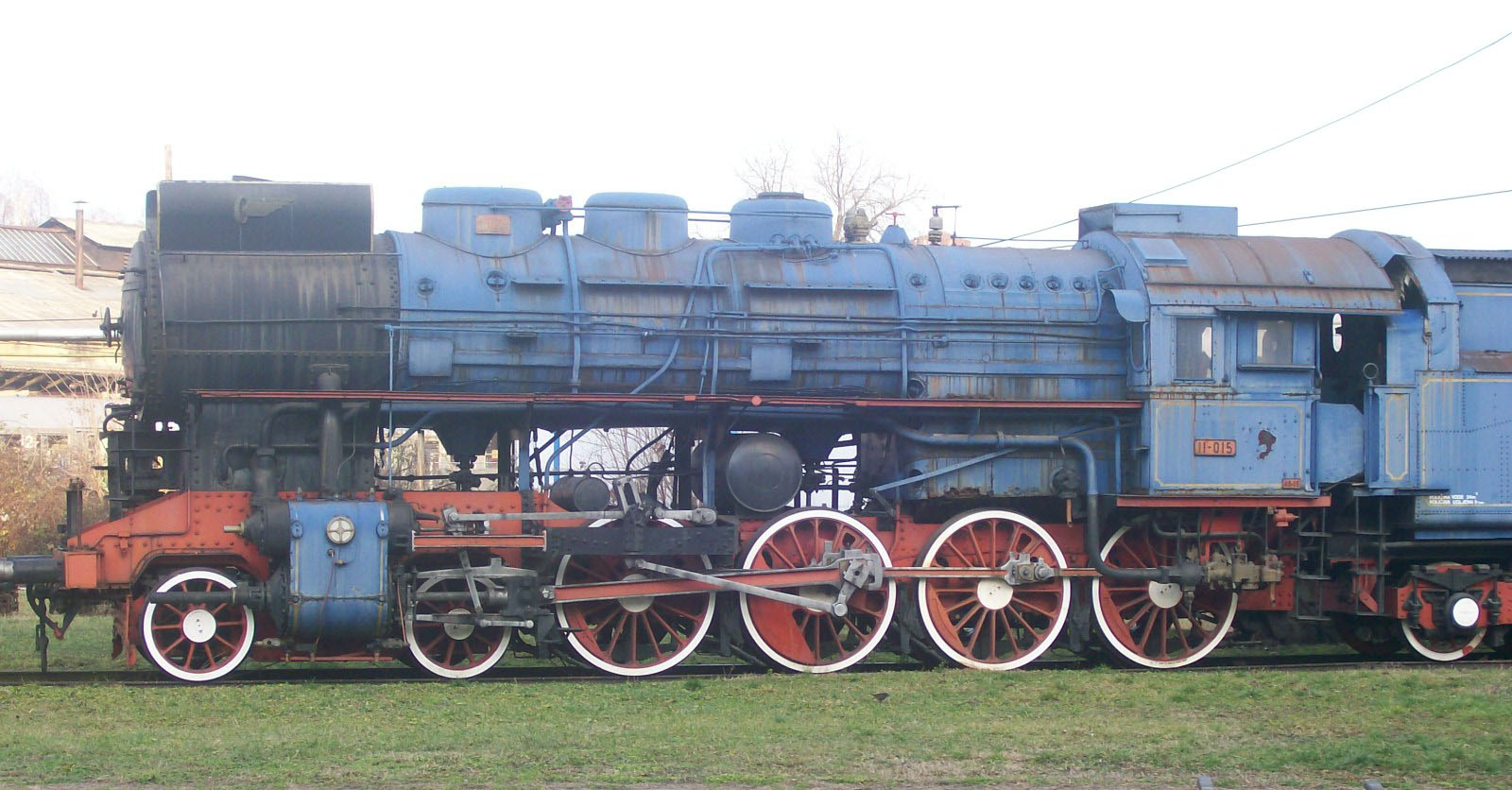

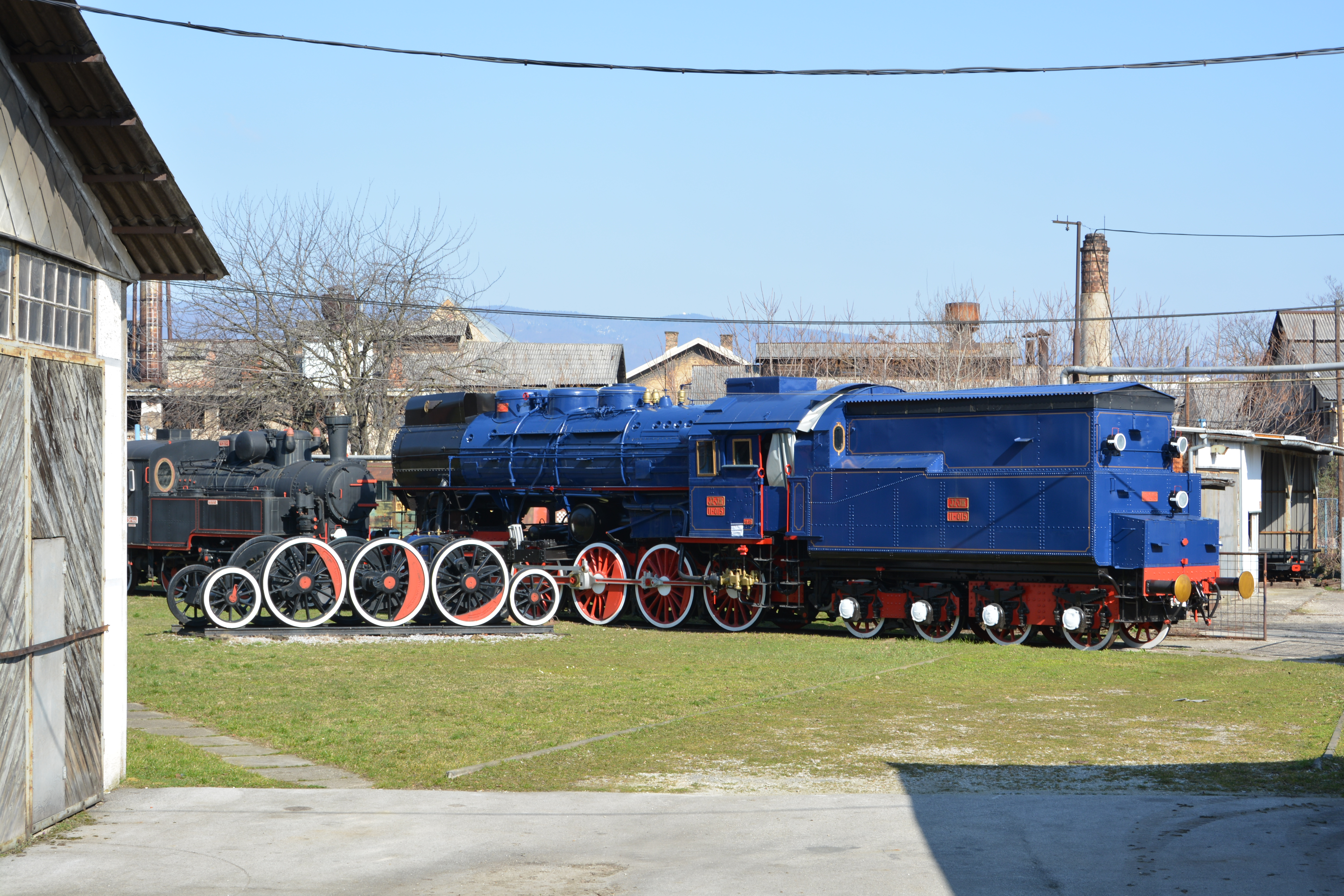

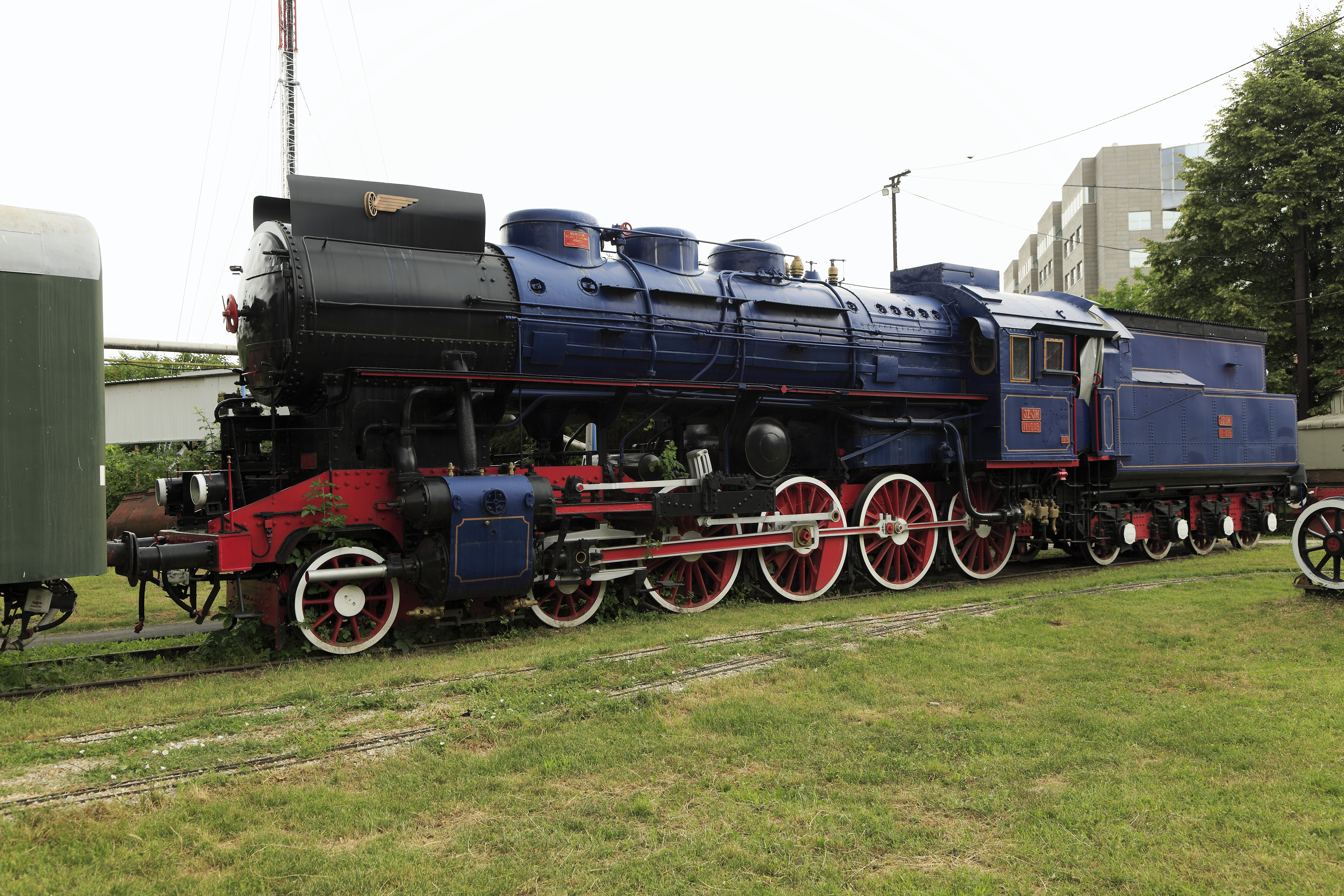

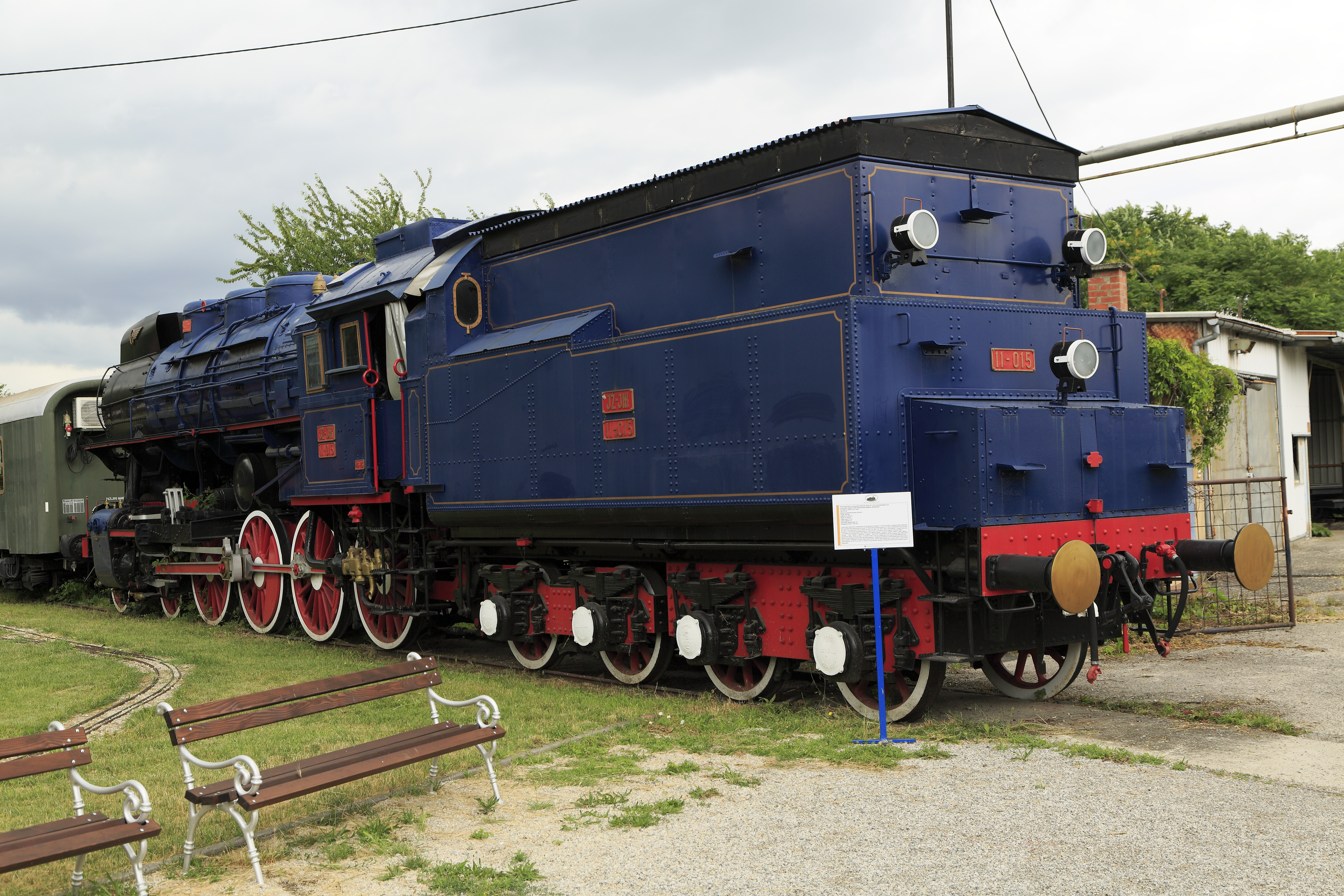

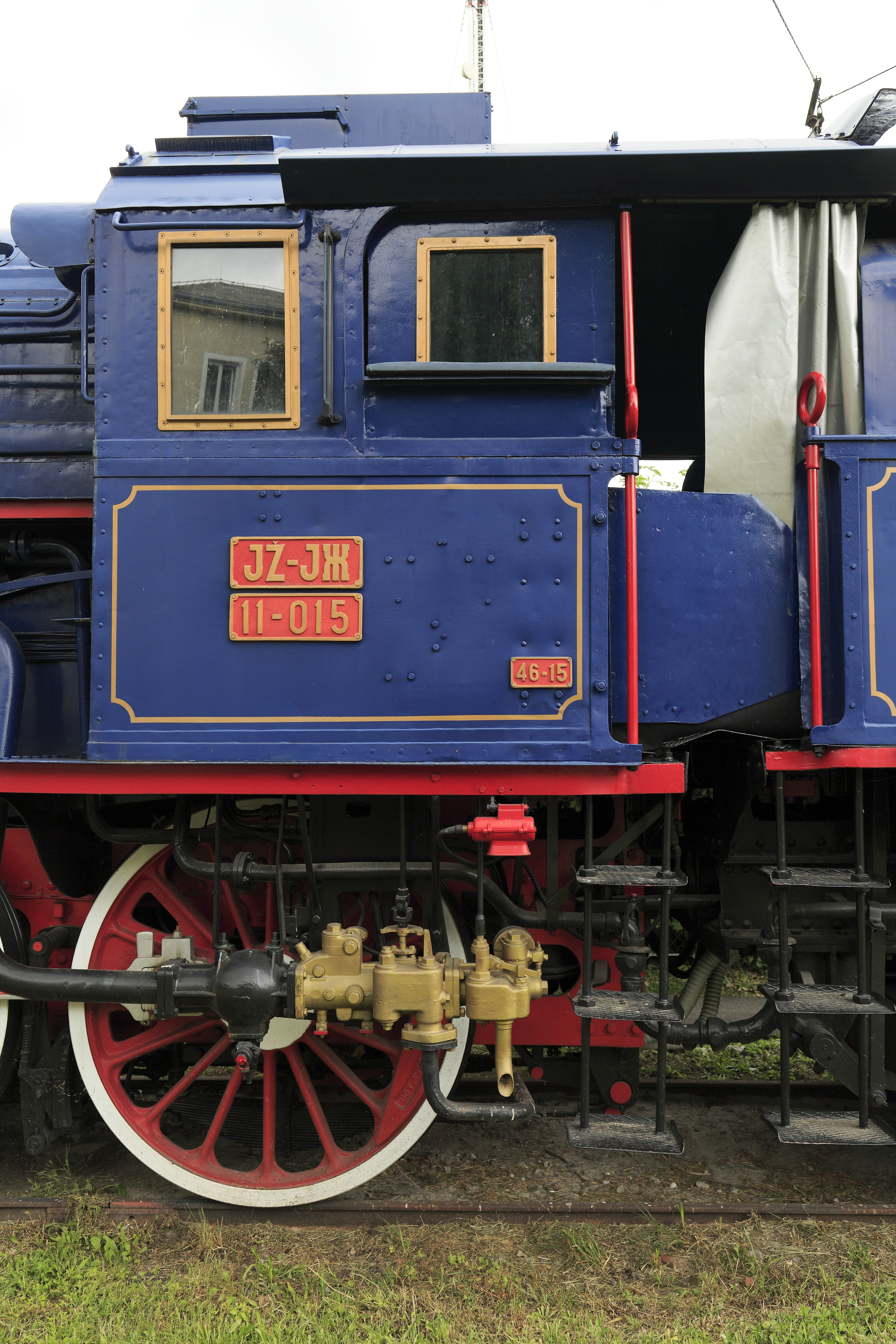

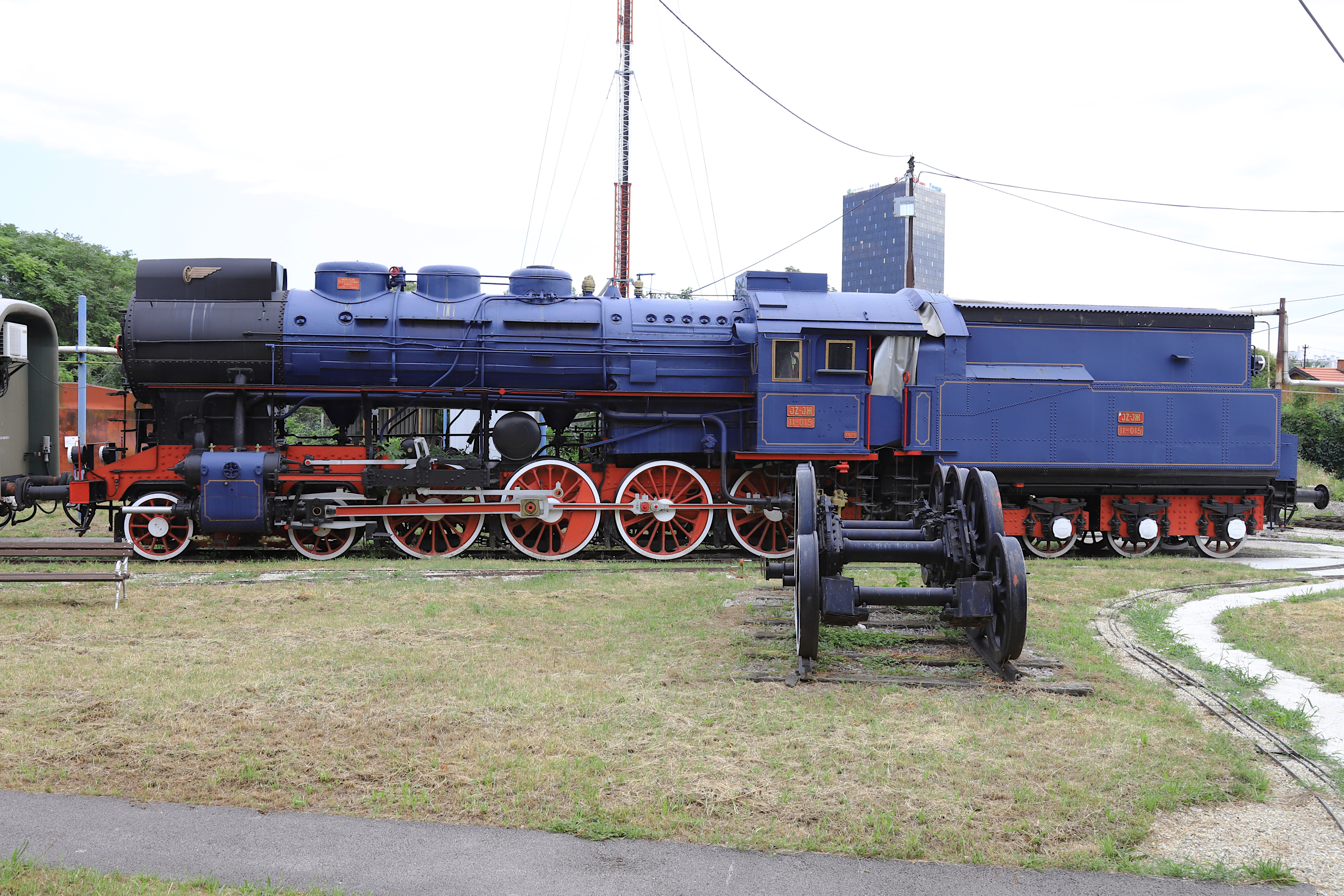

==== JŽ 11-059 ====
- Location: Stored at Ranzirni Kolodvor Depot in Zagreb.

==== JŽ 11-061 ====
- Location: Display in Knin, Croatia
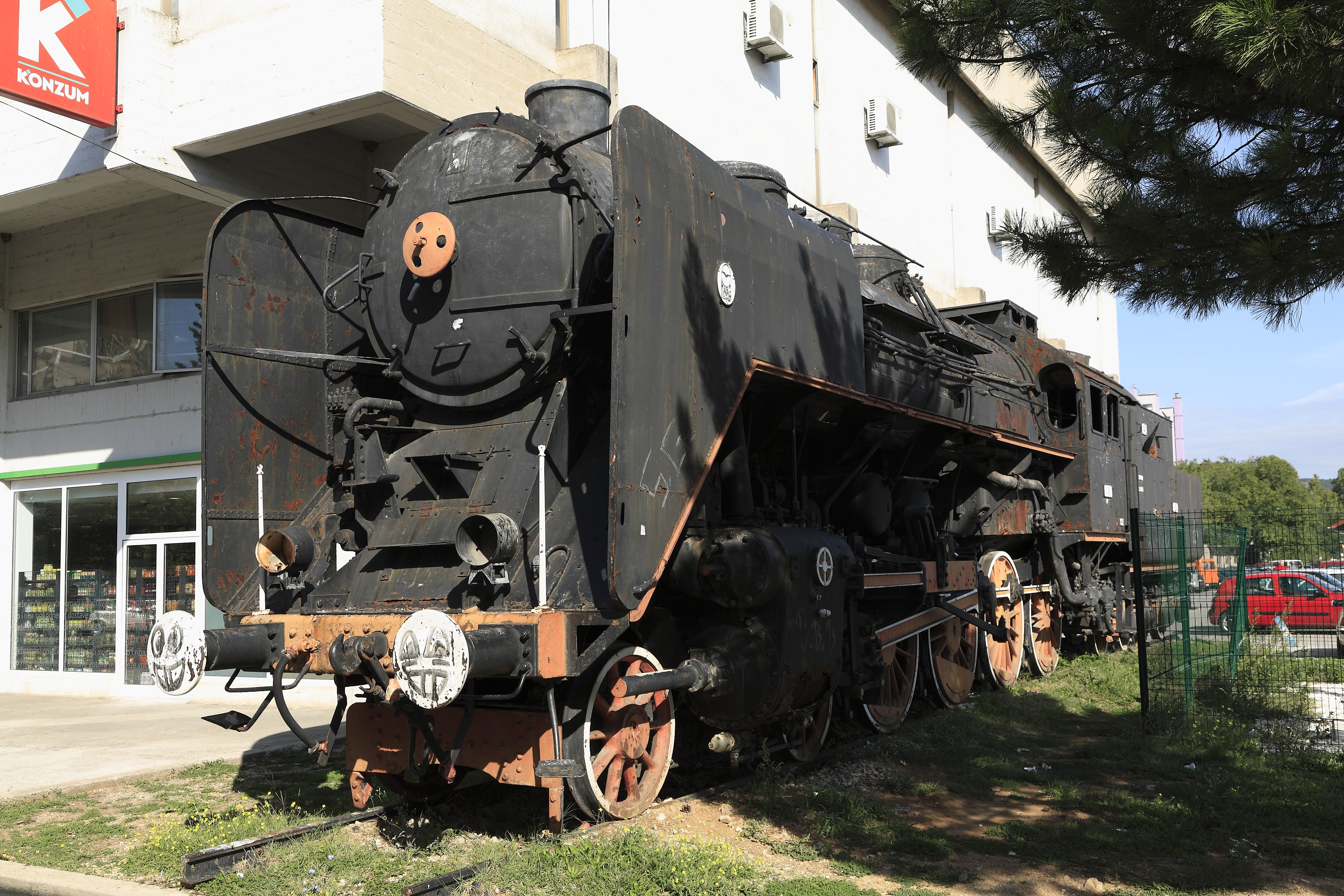

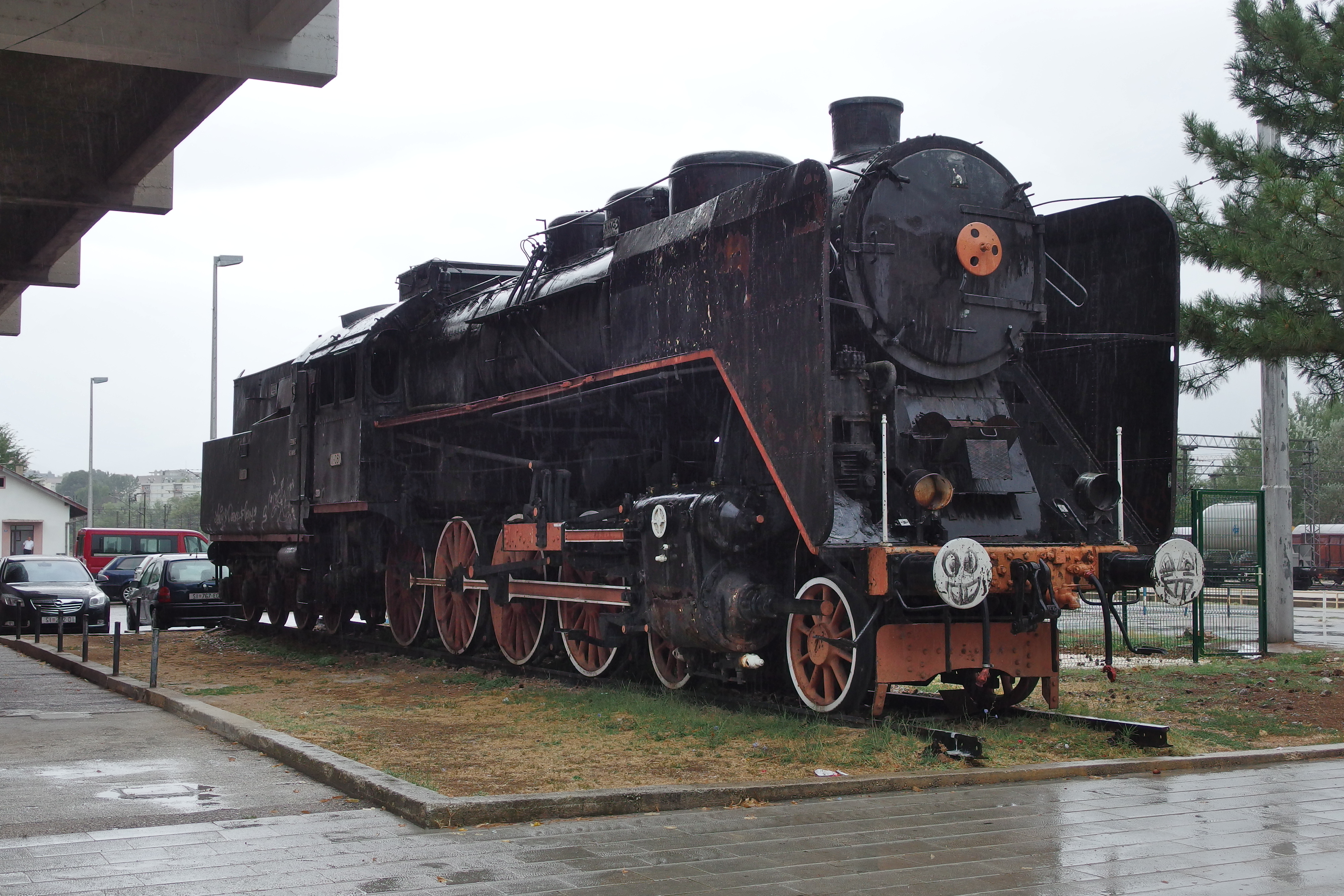

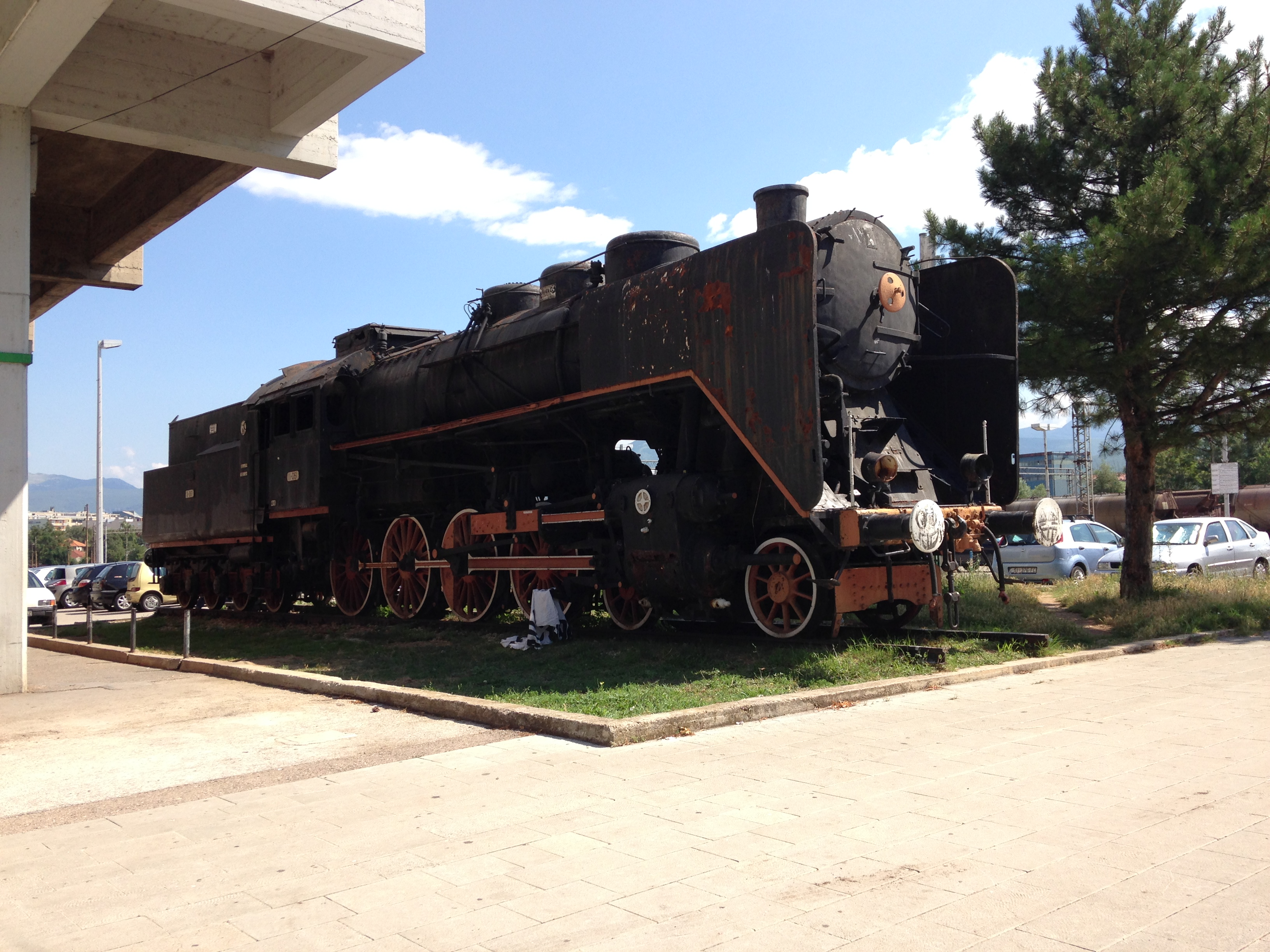

==== JŽ 11-062 ====
- Location: Stored at Ranzirni Kolodvor Depot in Zagreb.

==== JŽ 20-184 ====
- Location: Displayed with a train of waggons at Jasenovac Concentration Camp as part of a "Memorial Train" display.
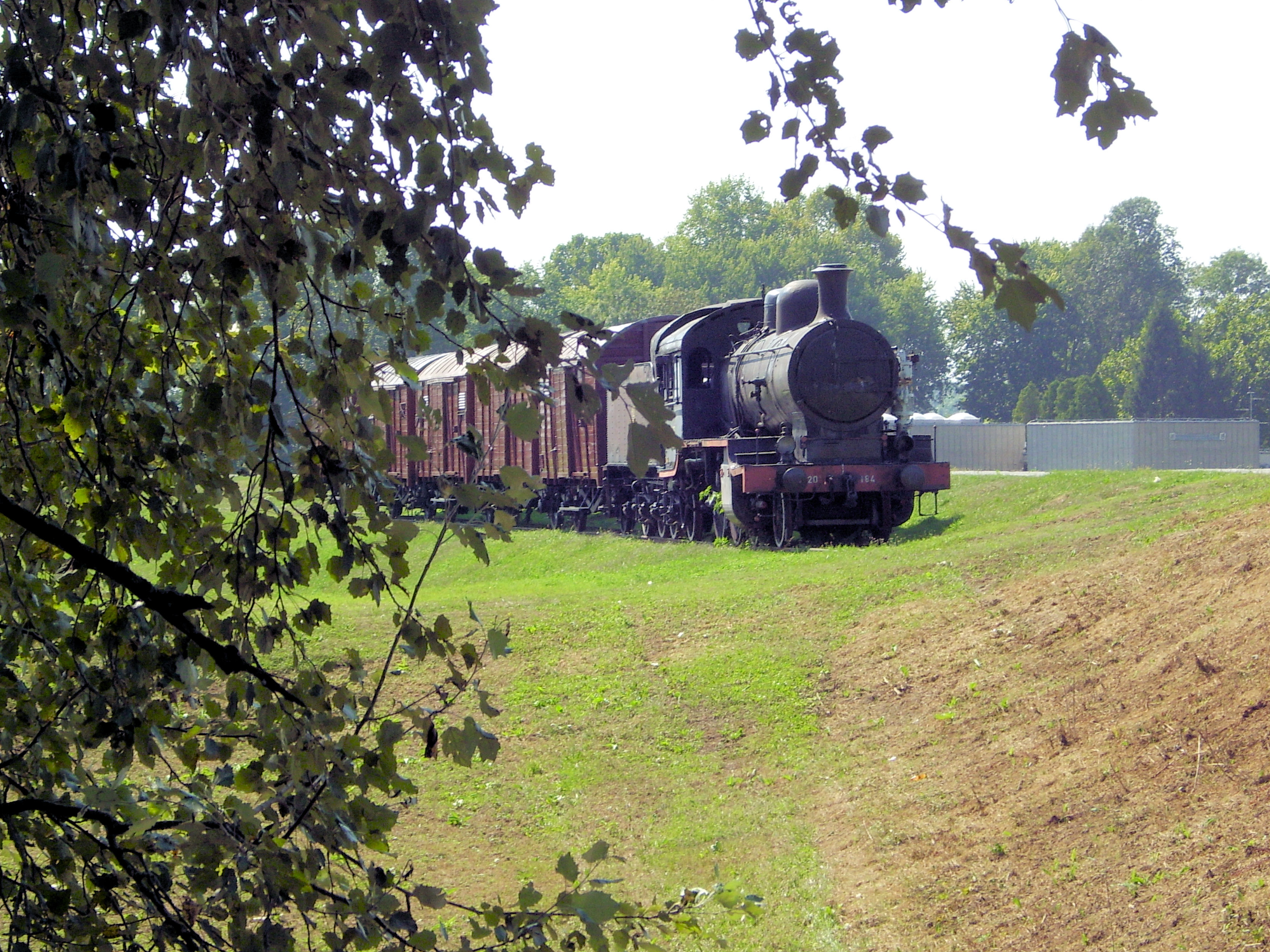

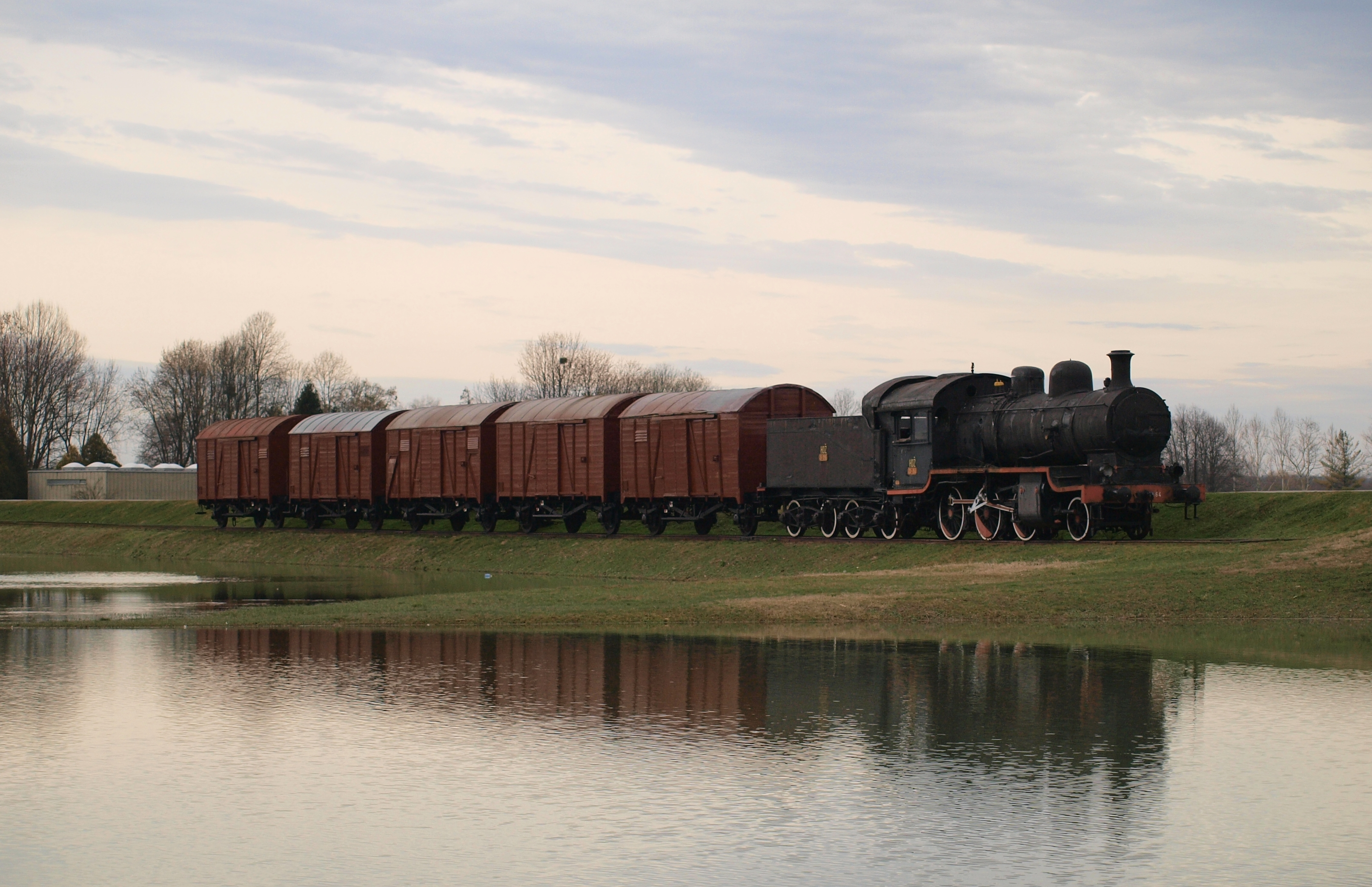

==== JŽ 22-047 ====
Stored in the depot at Sisak.

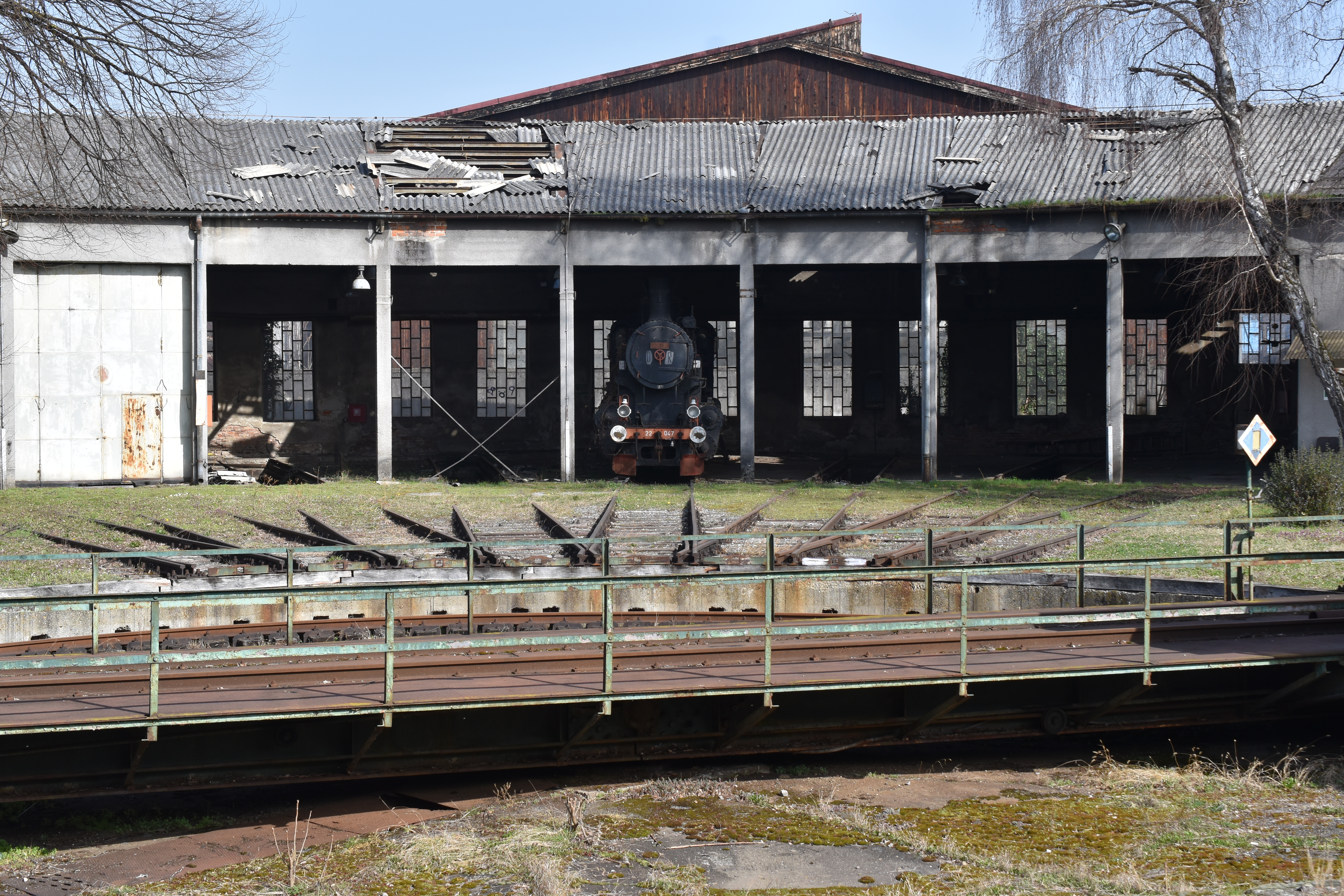

==== JŽ 22-101 ====
Location: outside of the Sisak railway station

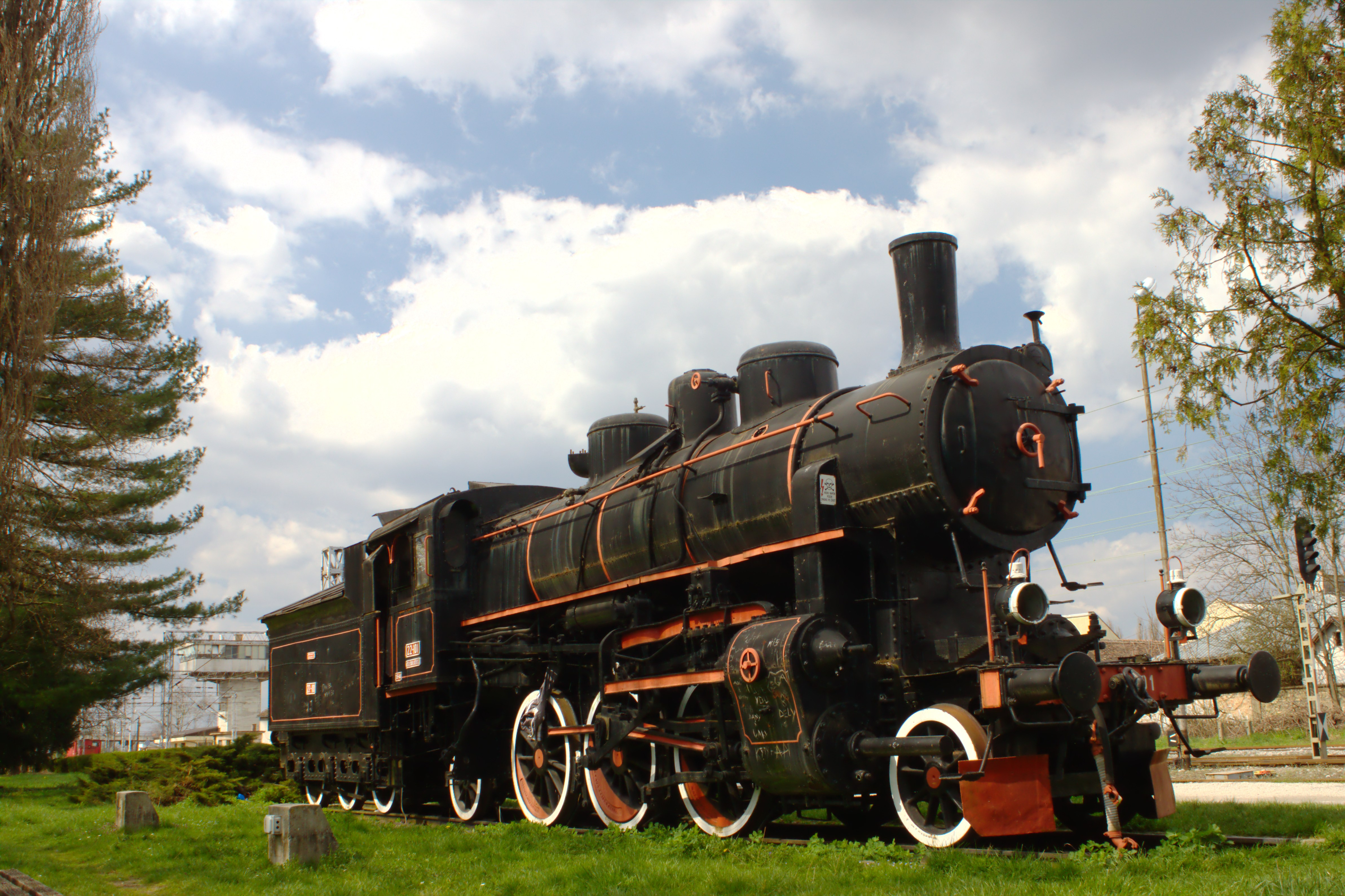

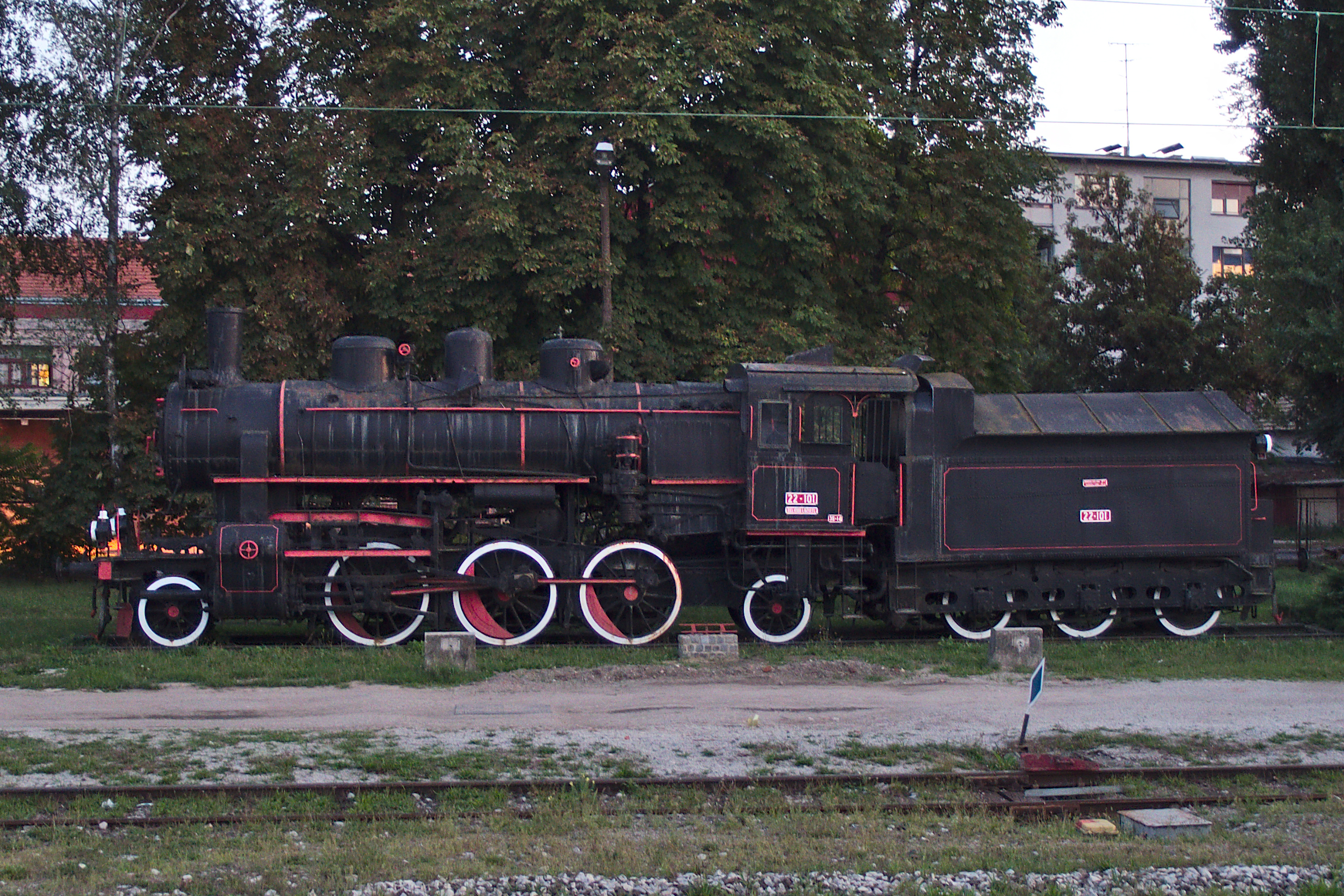

==== JŽ 33-042 ====
- Location: Stored at Ranzirni Kolodvor Depot in Zagreb.

==== JŽ 33-098 ====
- Location: Croatian Railway Museum in Zagreb (HŽM)
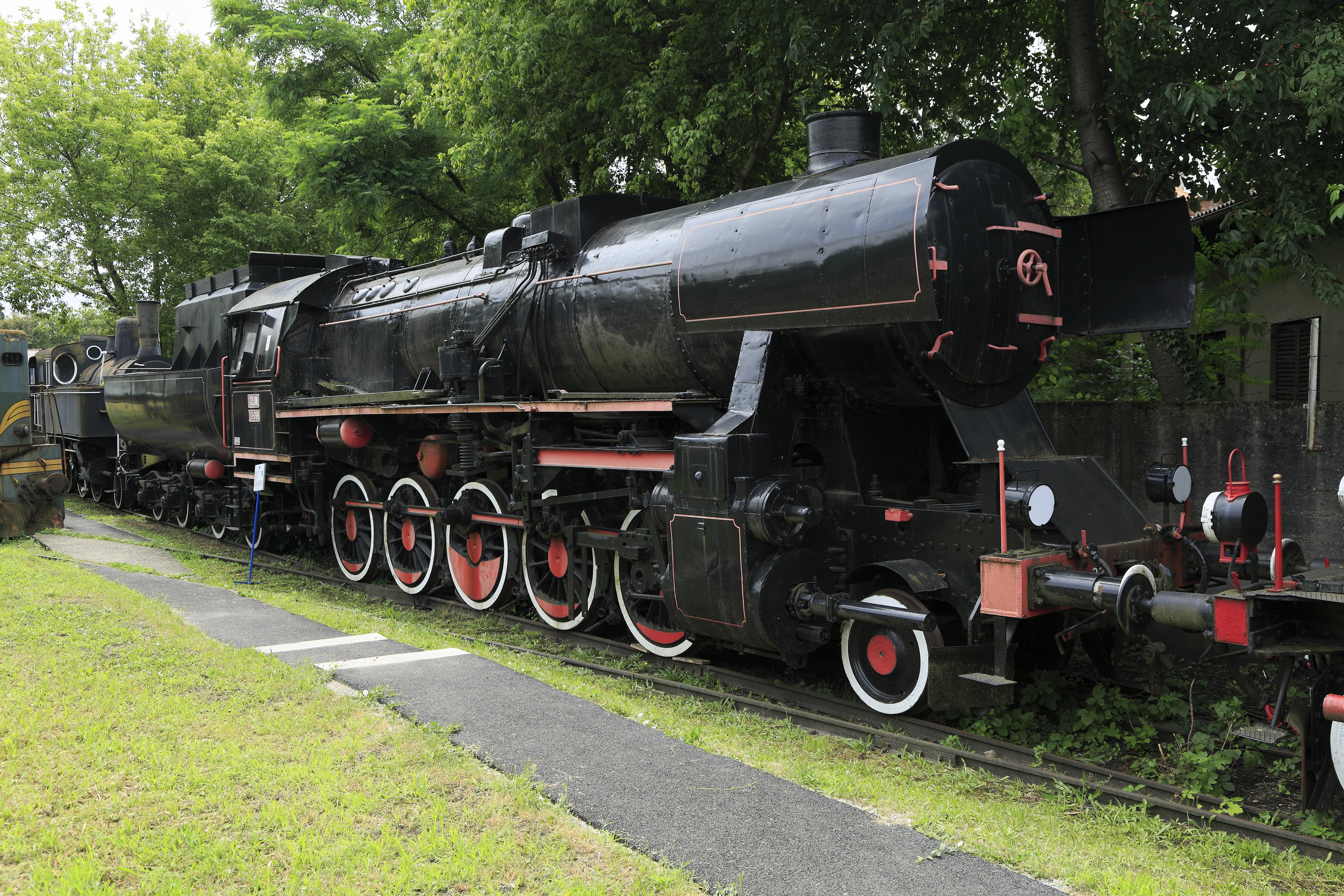

==== JŽ 33-161 ====
- Location: Stored at Ranzirni Kolodvor Depot in Zagreb.

==== JŽ 33-327 ====
- Location: Stored at Ranzirni Kolodvor Depot in Zagreb.

==== JŽ 51-032 ====
- Location: outside of the Rijeka railway station
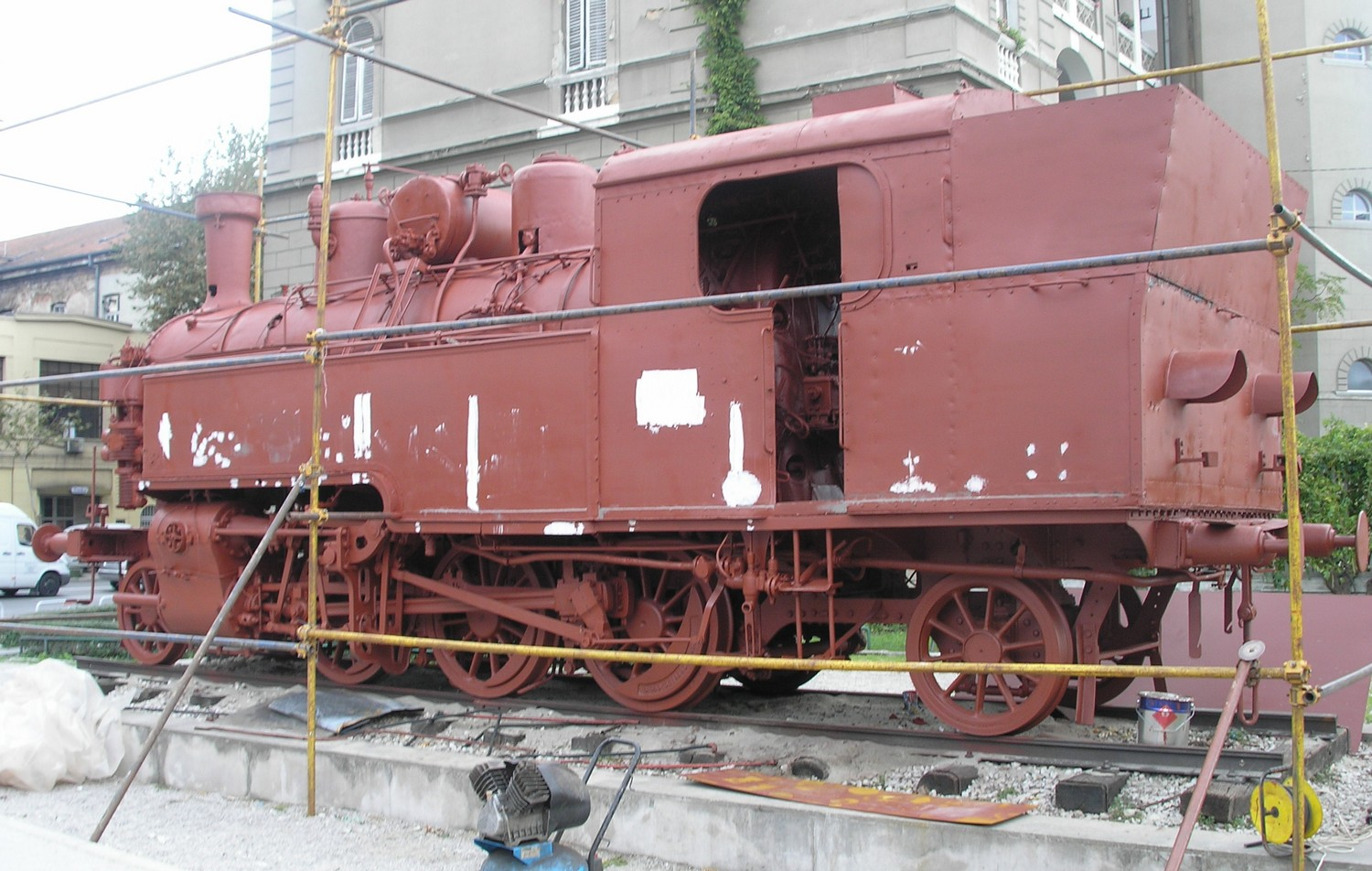
Refurbishment process in 2007

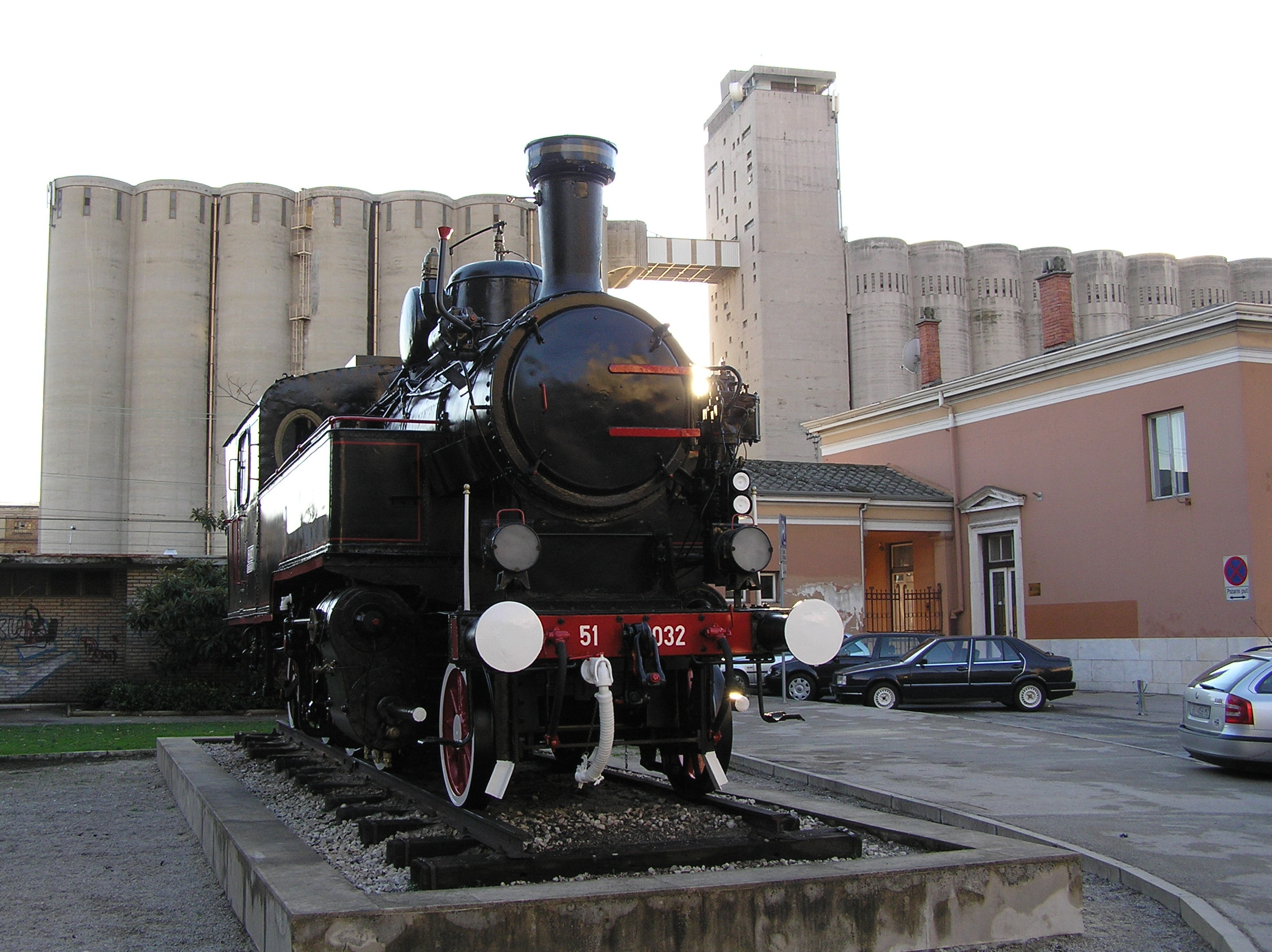
Post refurbishment

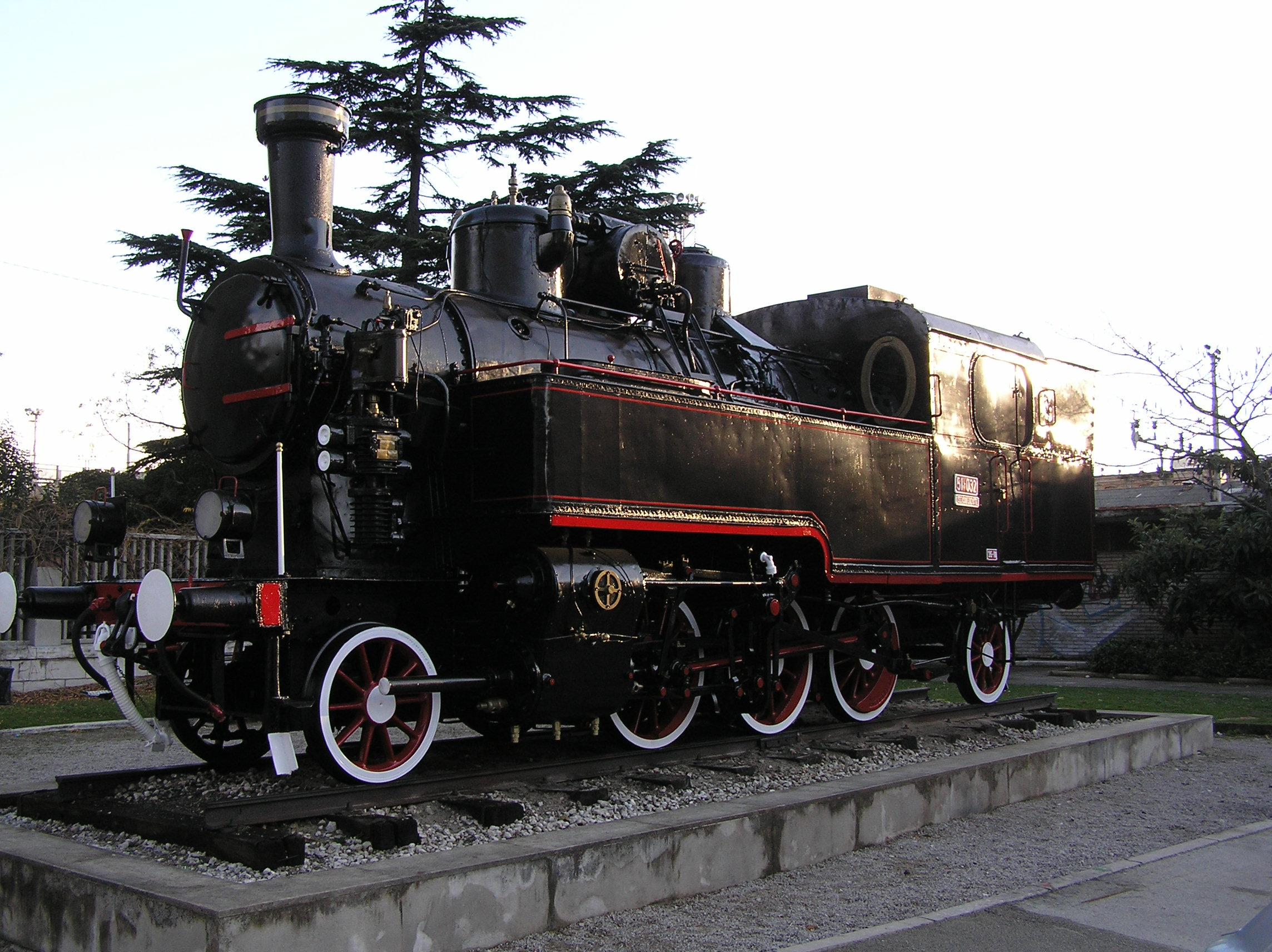

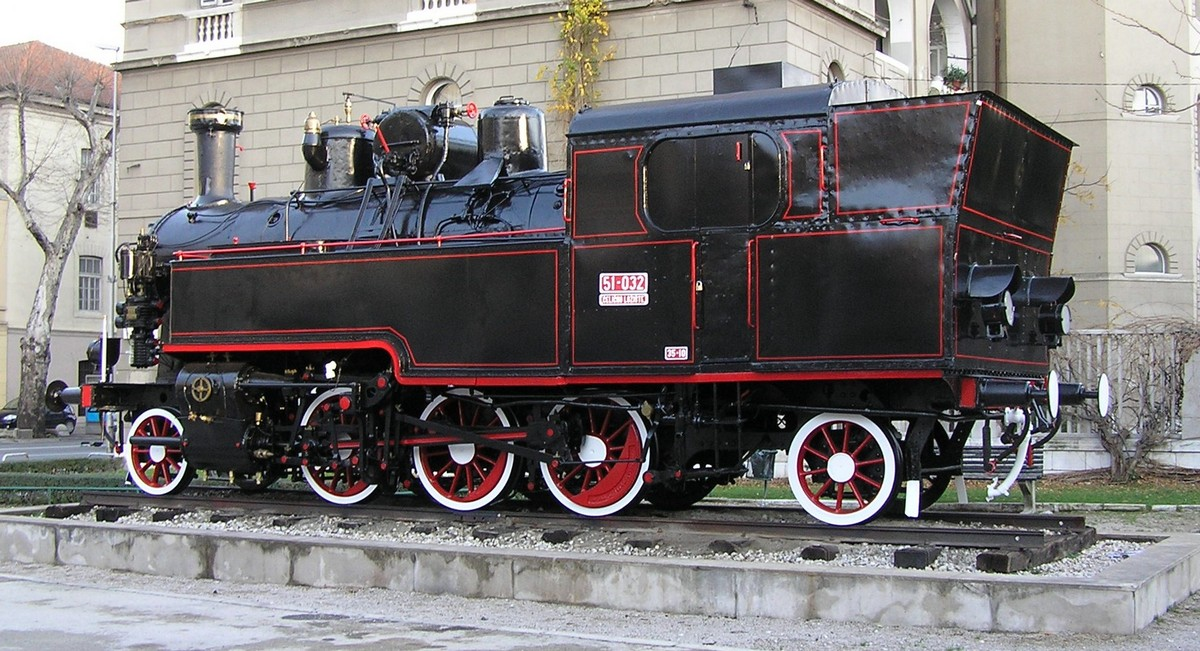

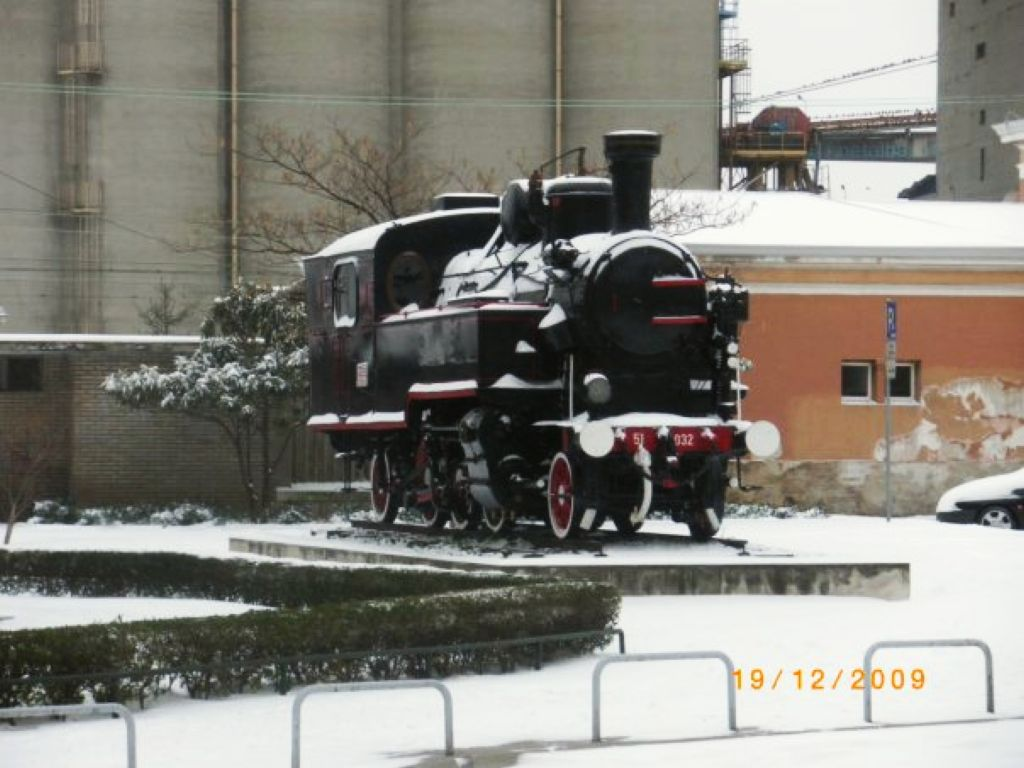

==== JŽ 51-053 ====
Displayed with a train in a park in Veliki Grđevac.

==== JŽ 51-060 ====
- Location:Bjelovar
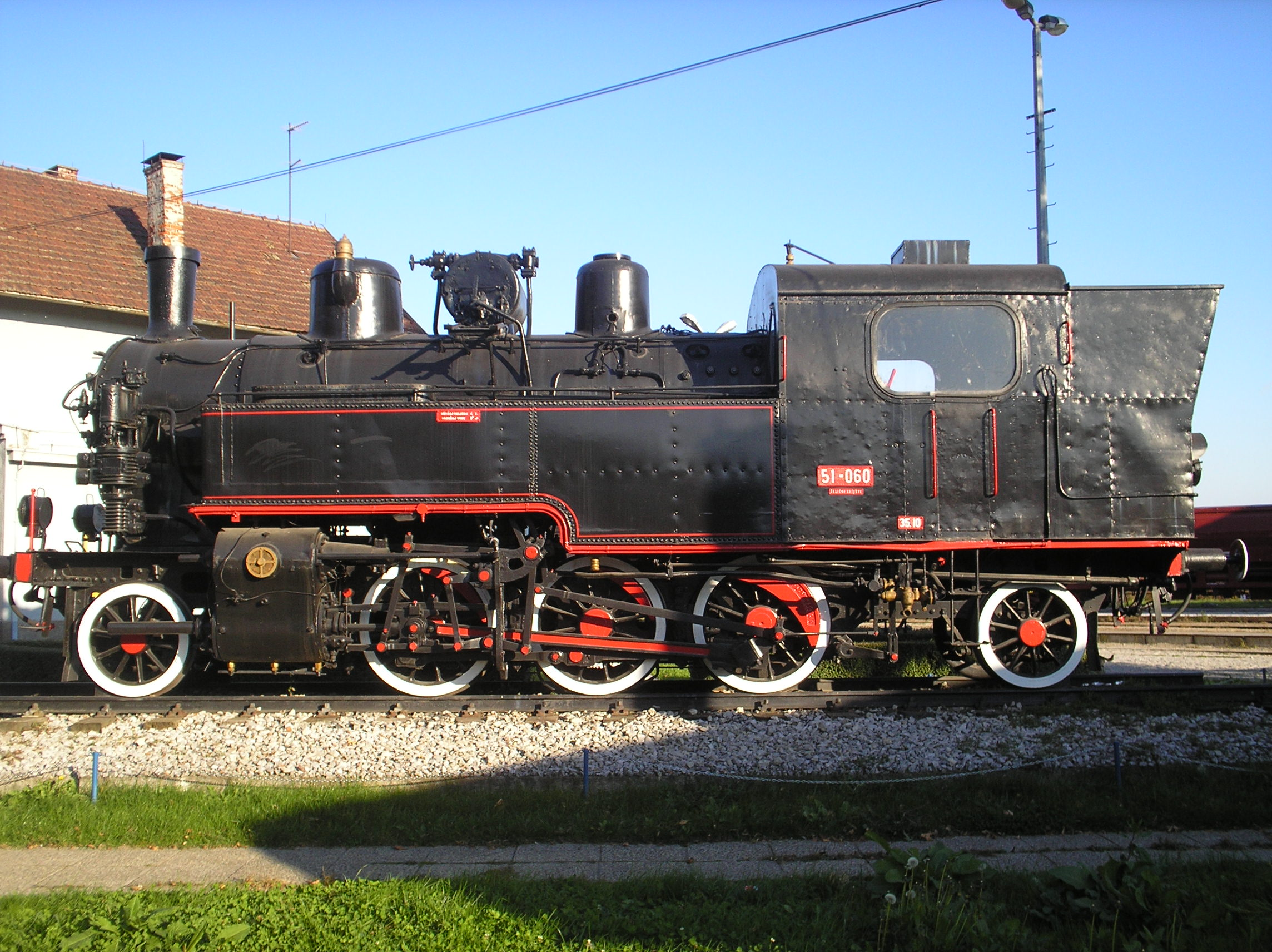

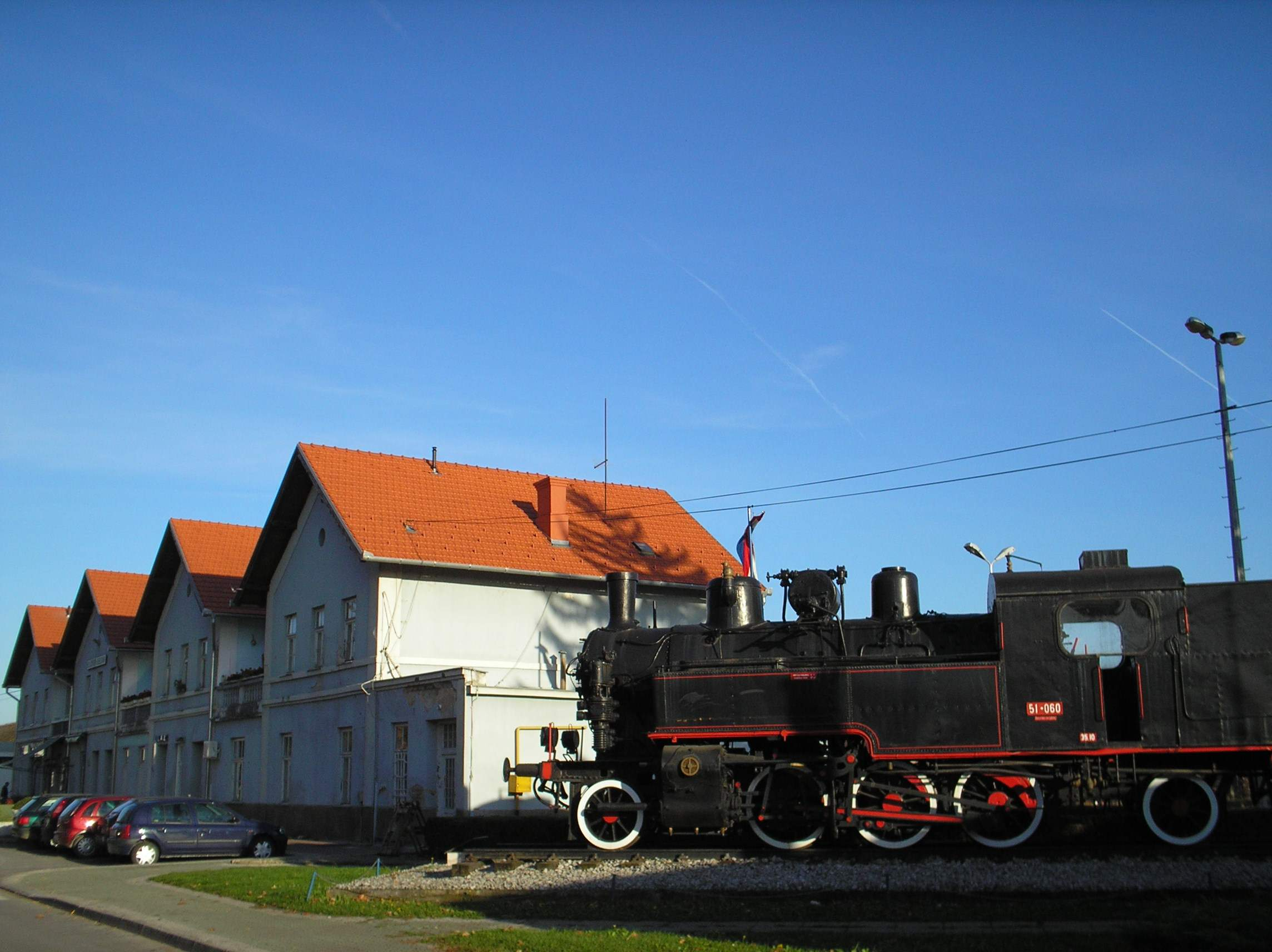

==== JŽ 51-103 ====
Ivanec Railway Station.

==== JŽ 51-133 ====
- Location: Vinkovci
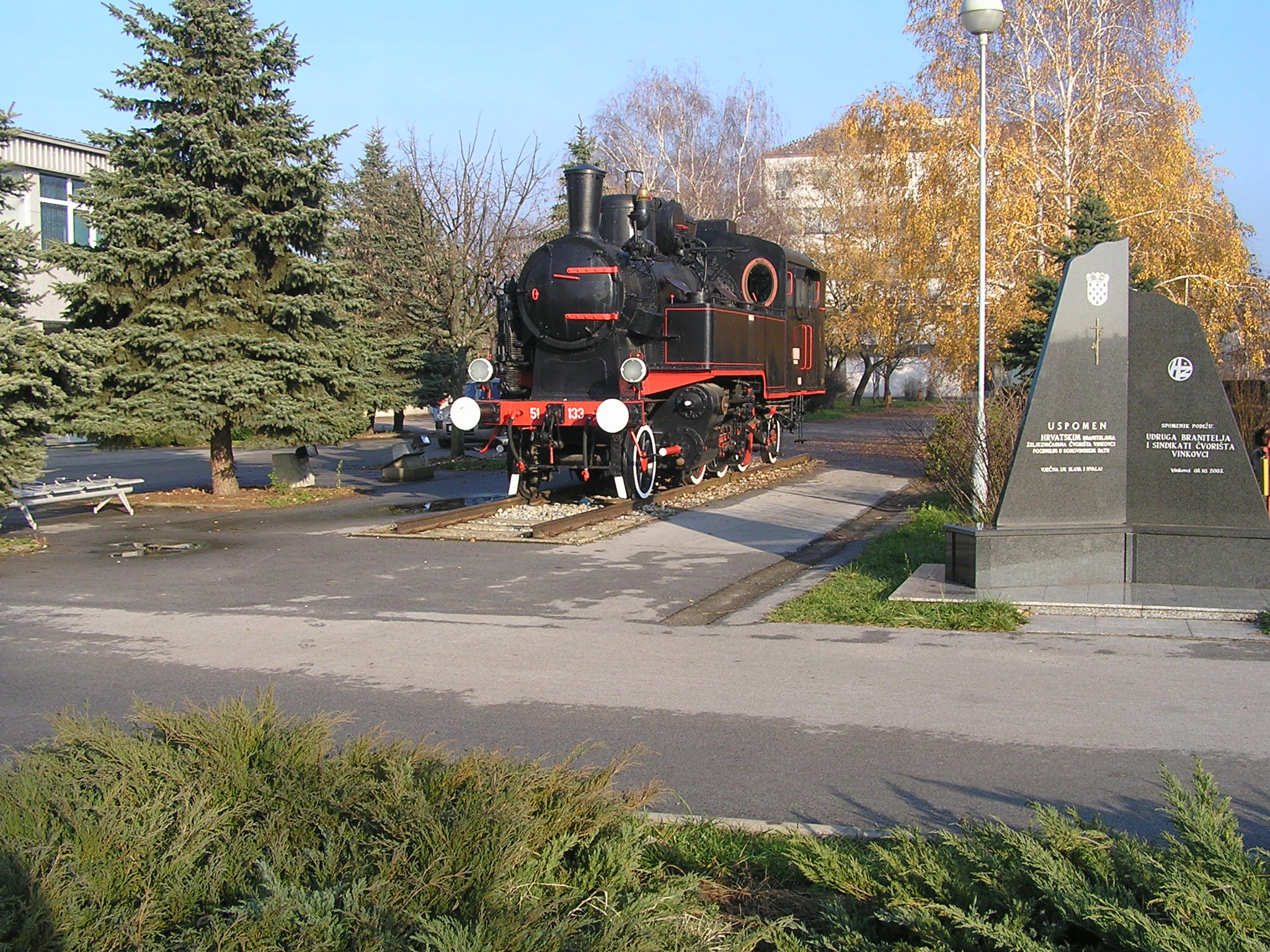

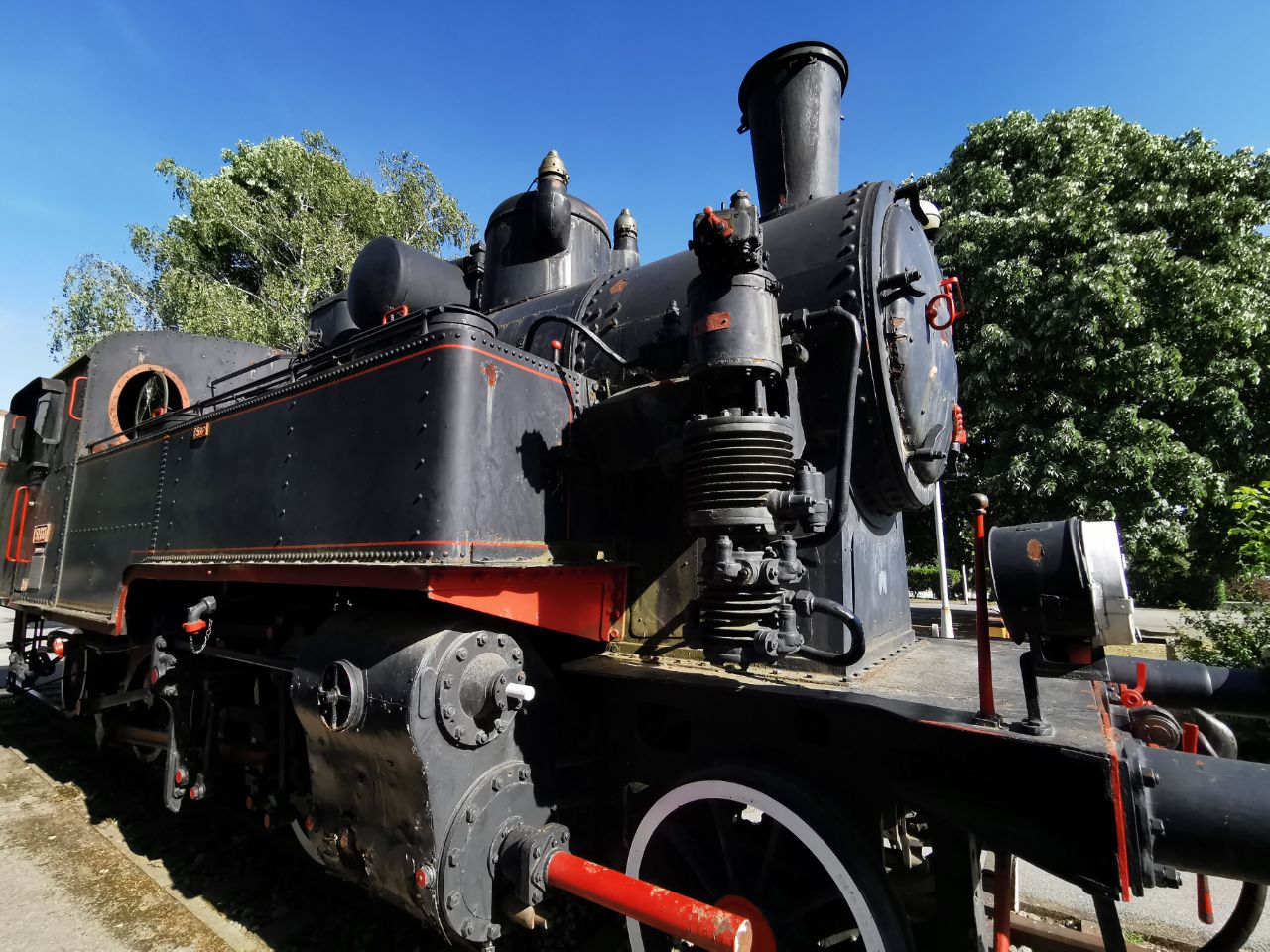

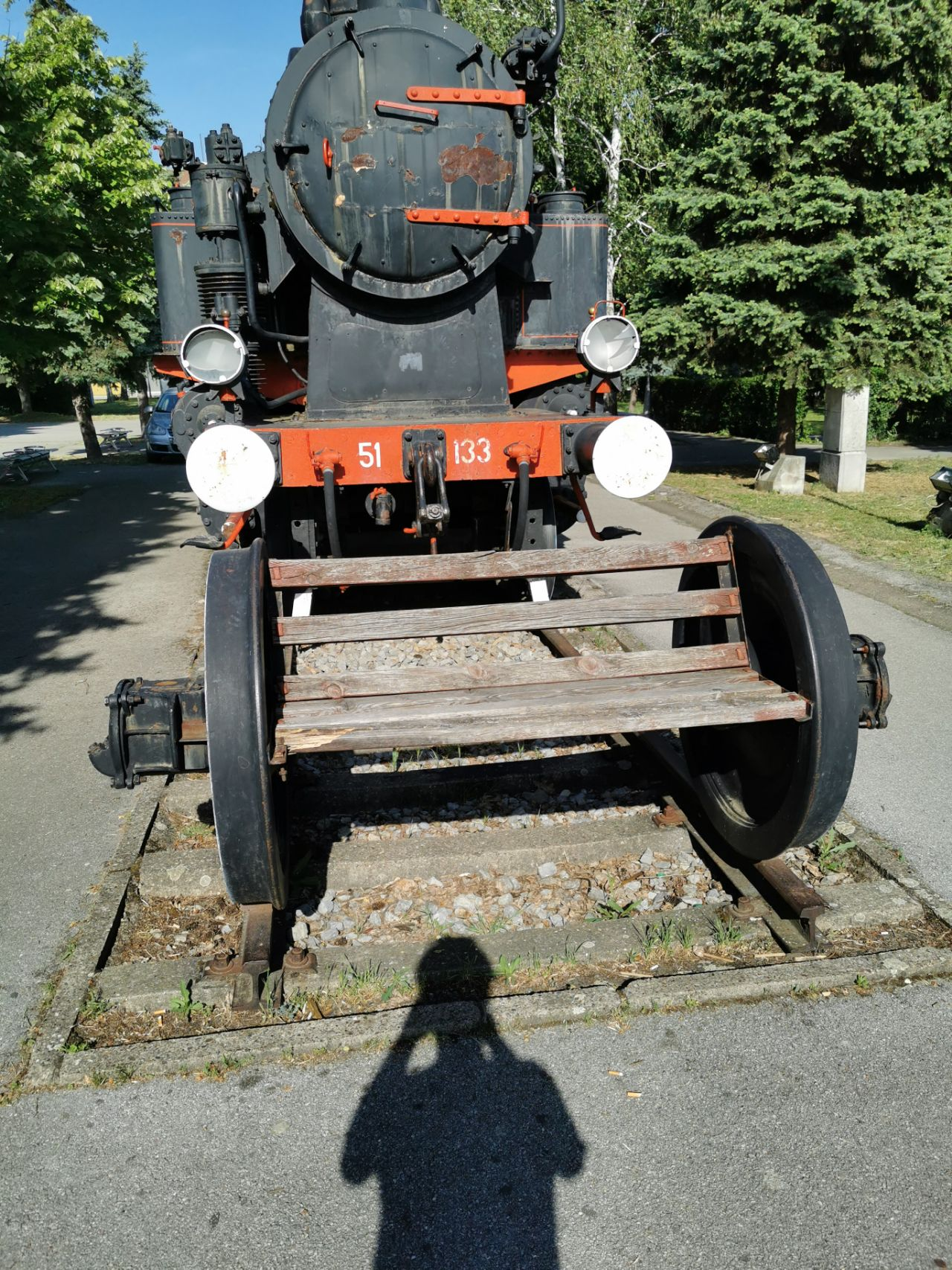

==== JŽ 51-136 ====
- Location: Virovitica
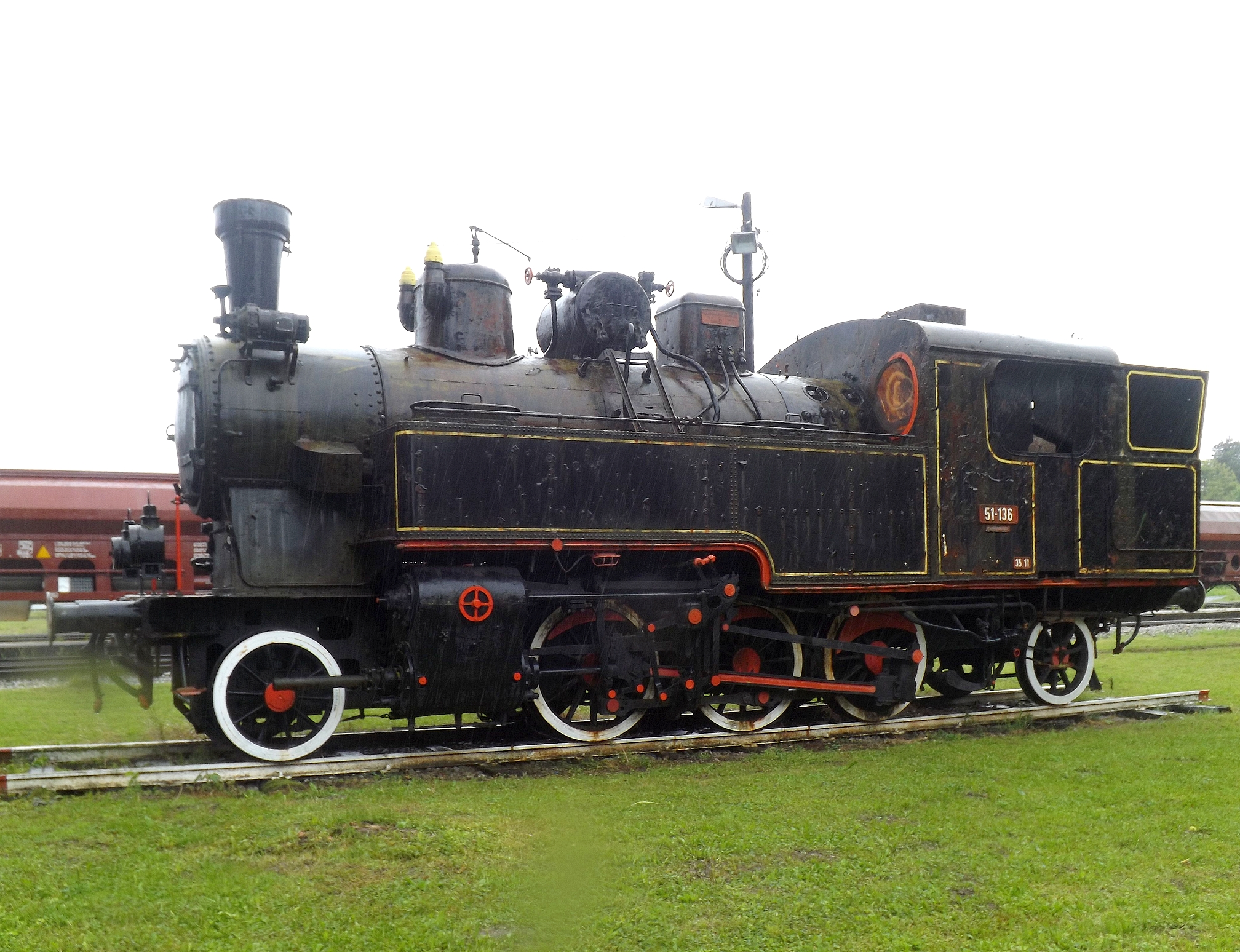

==== JŽ 51-141 ====
- Location: Stored at Ranzirni Kolodvor Depot in Zagreb.

==== JŽ 51-142 ====
- Location: Plinthed outside the Duro Dakovic Factory at Slavonski Brod.
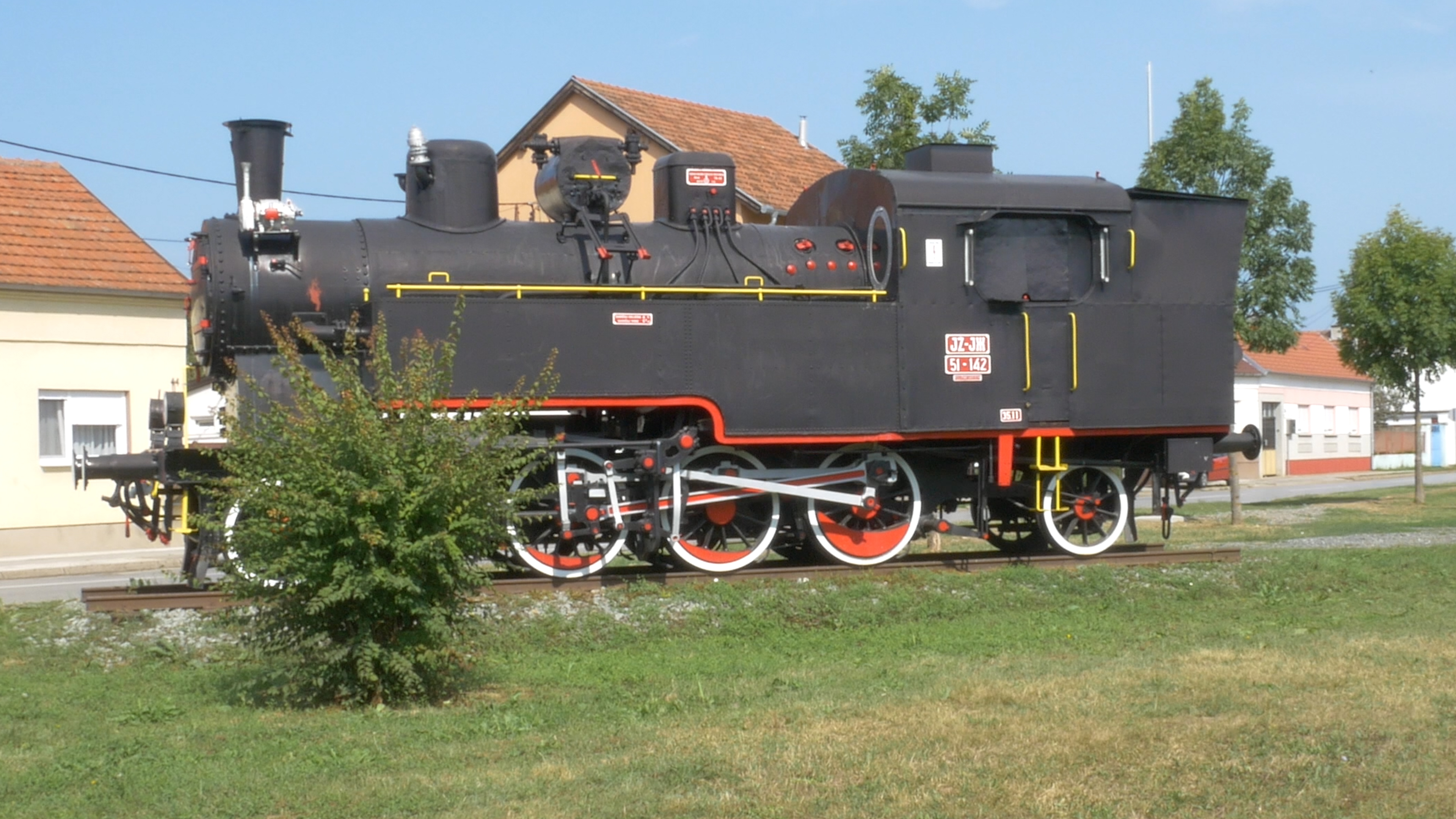

==== JŽ 51-144 ====
- Location: Croatian Railway Museum in Zagreb (HŽM)
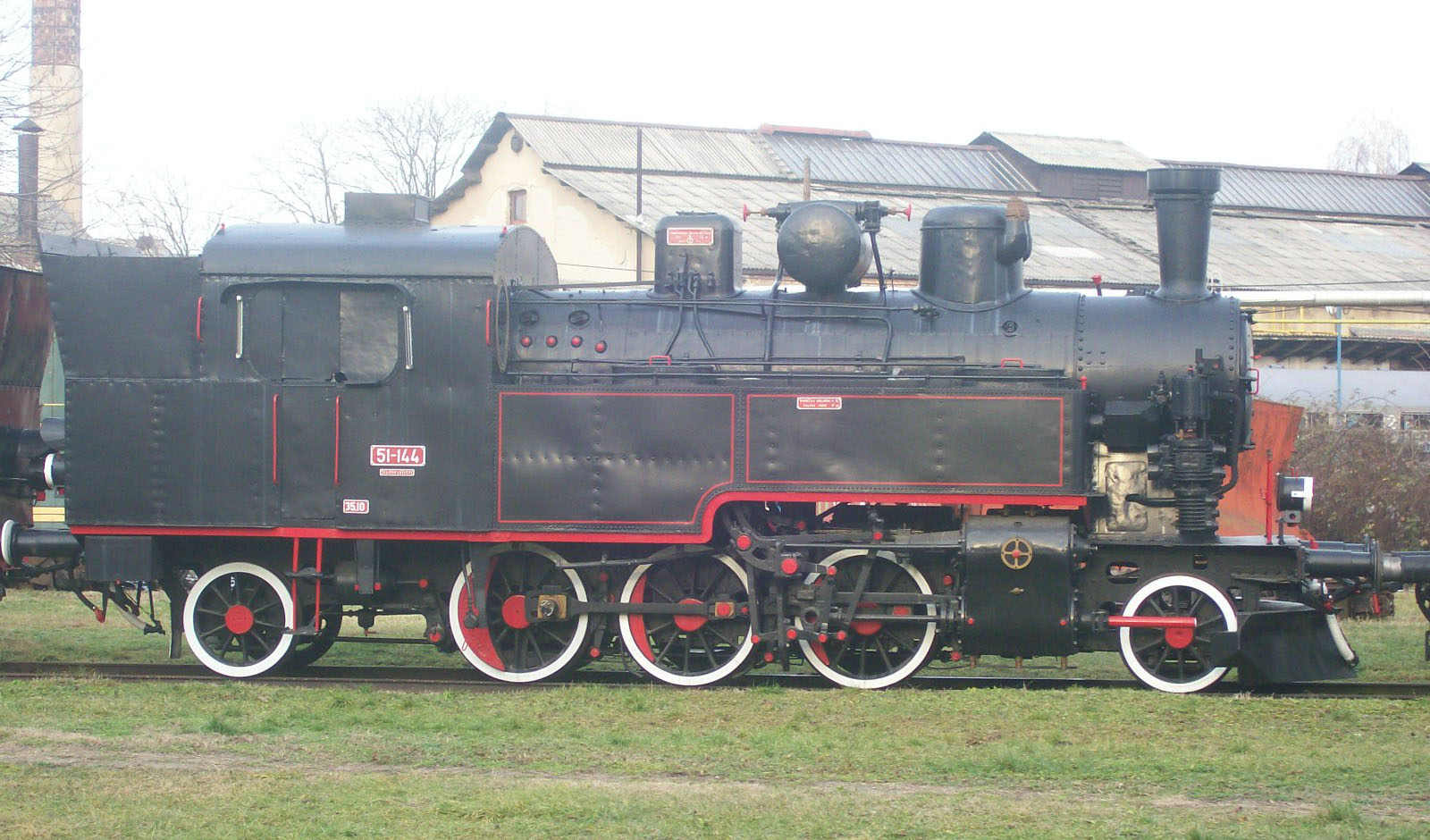

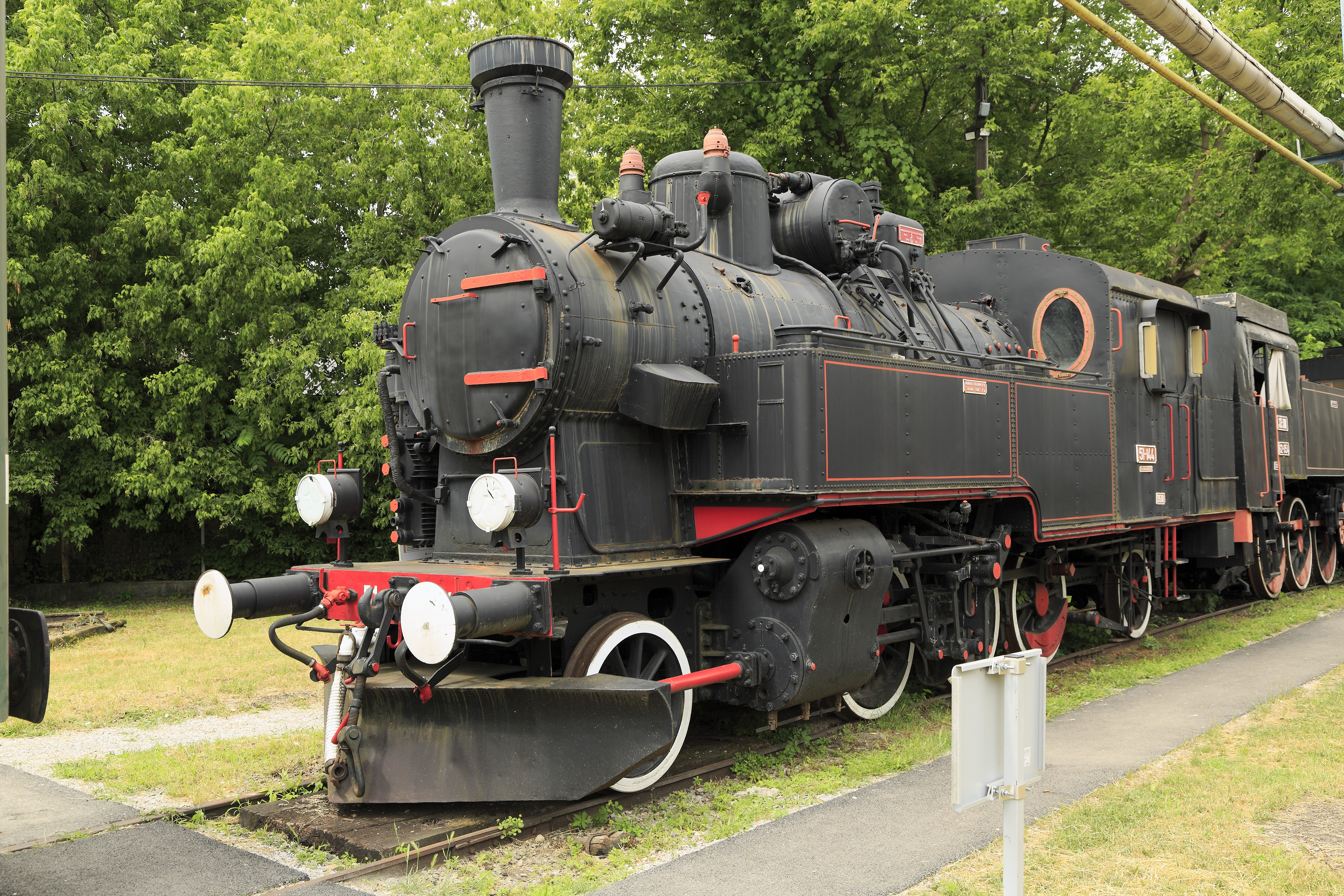

==== JŽ 51-145 ====
- Location: Varaždin
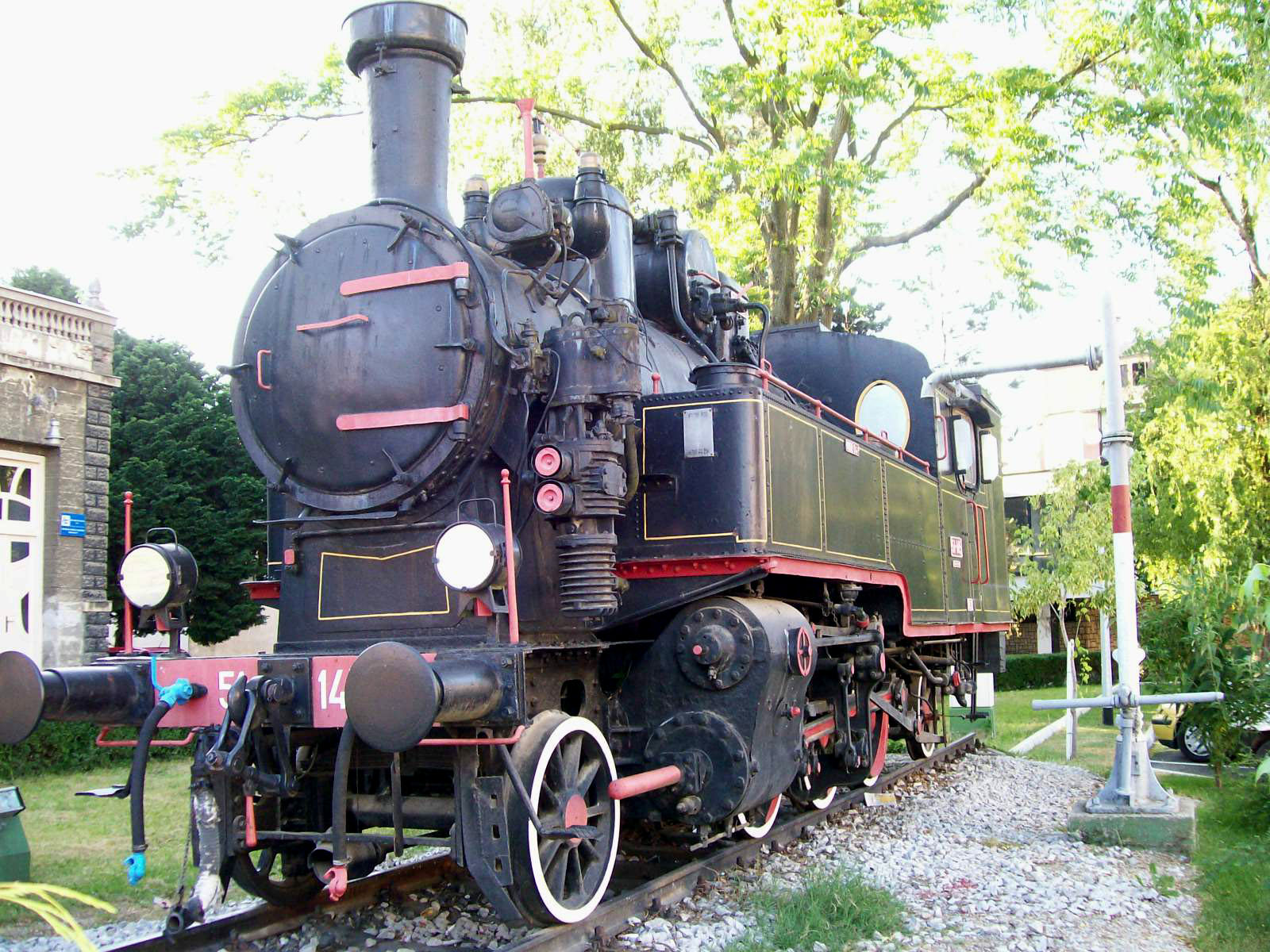

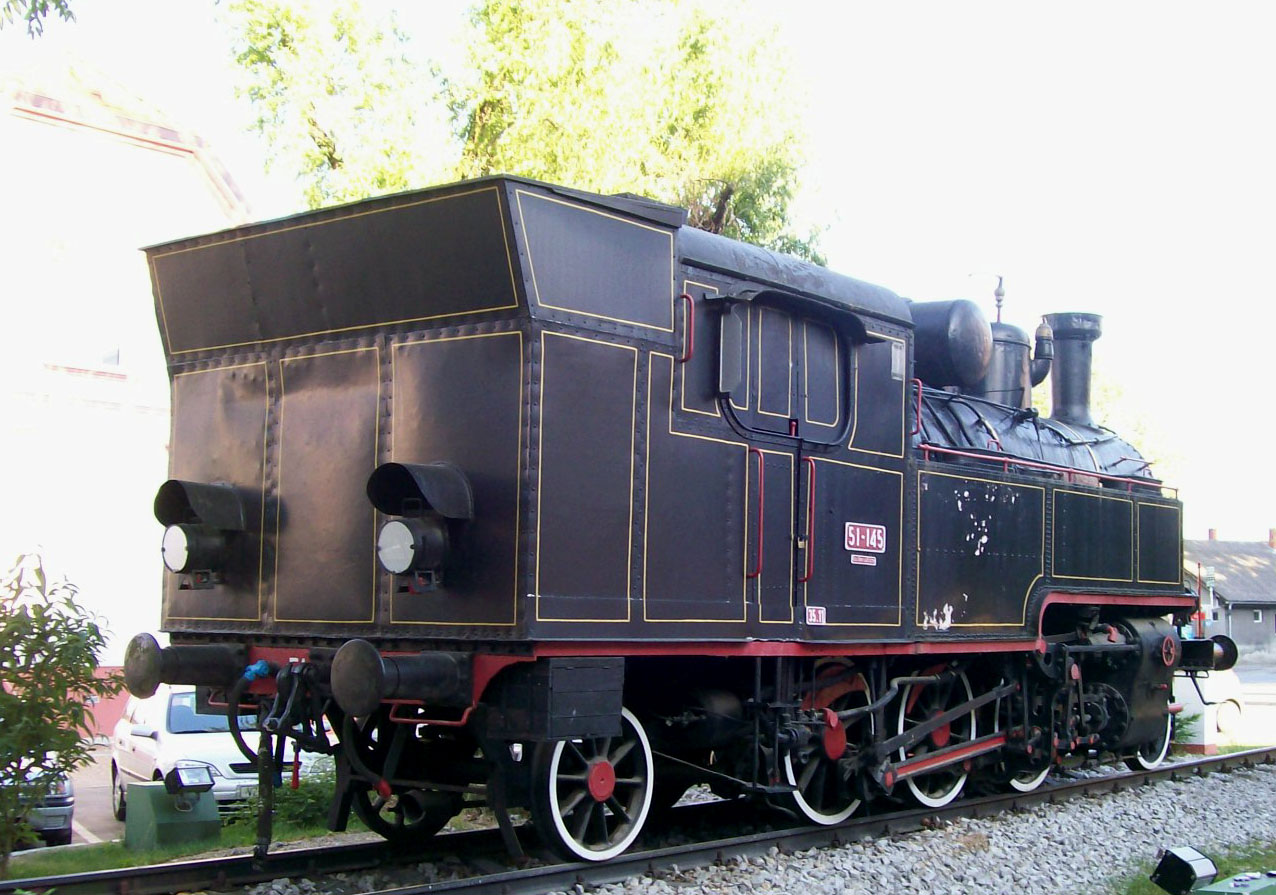

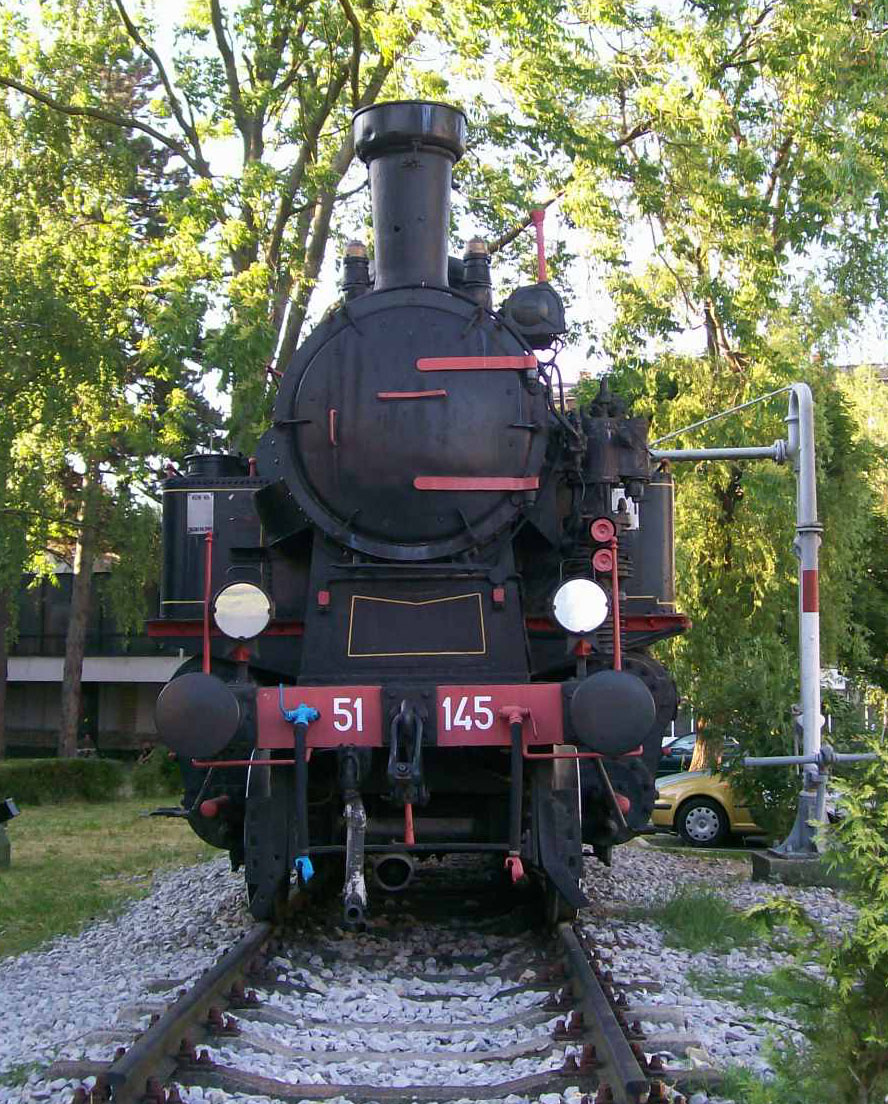

==== JŽ 51-148 ====
- Location: Plinthed at Ogulin Bus Station.
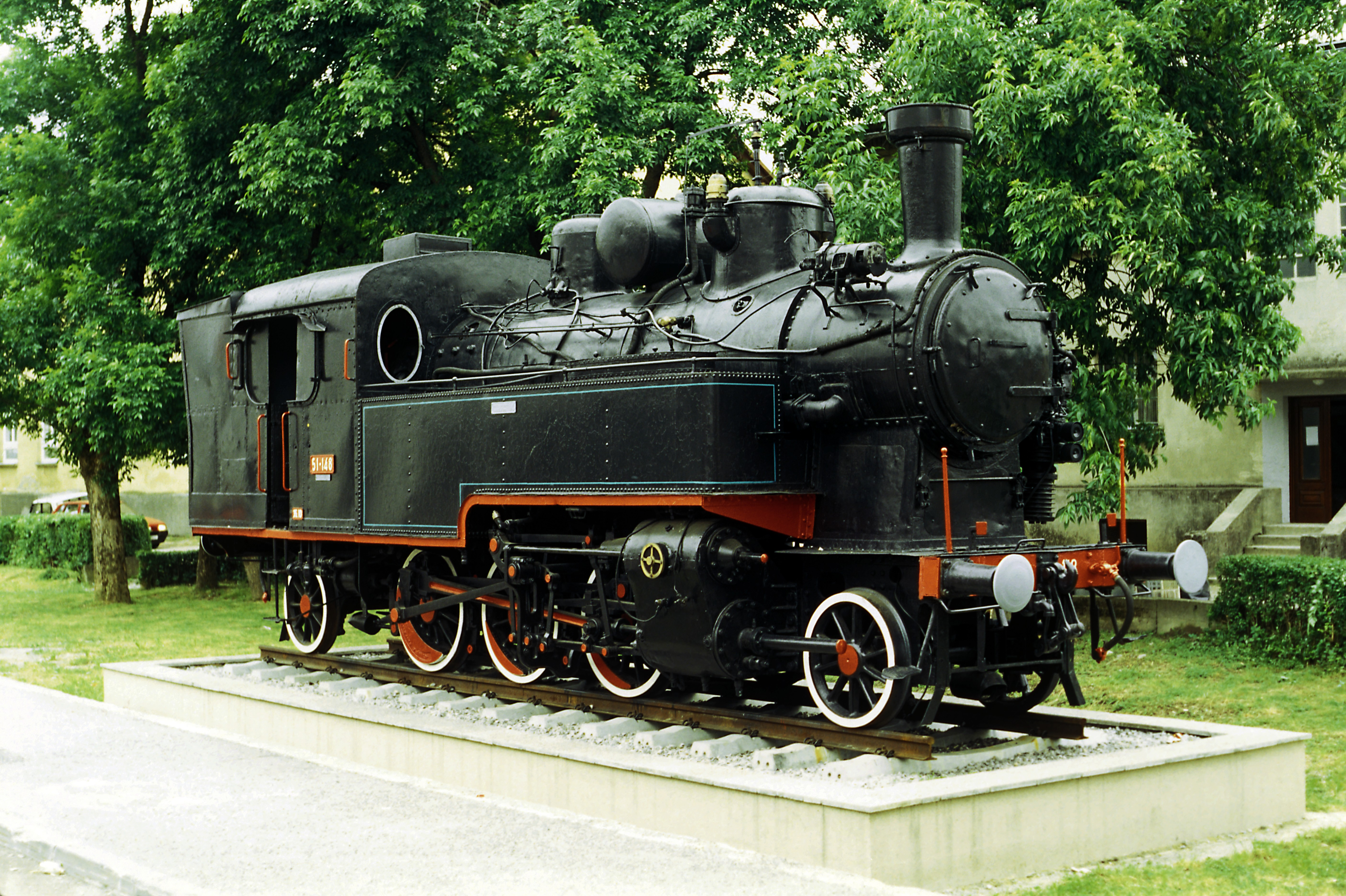

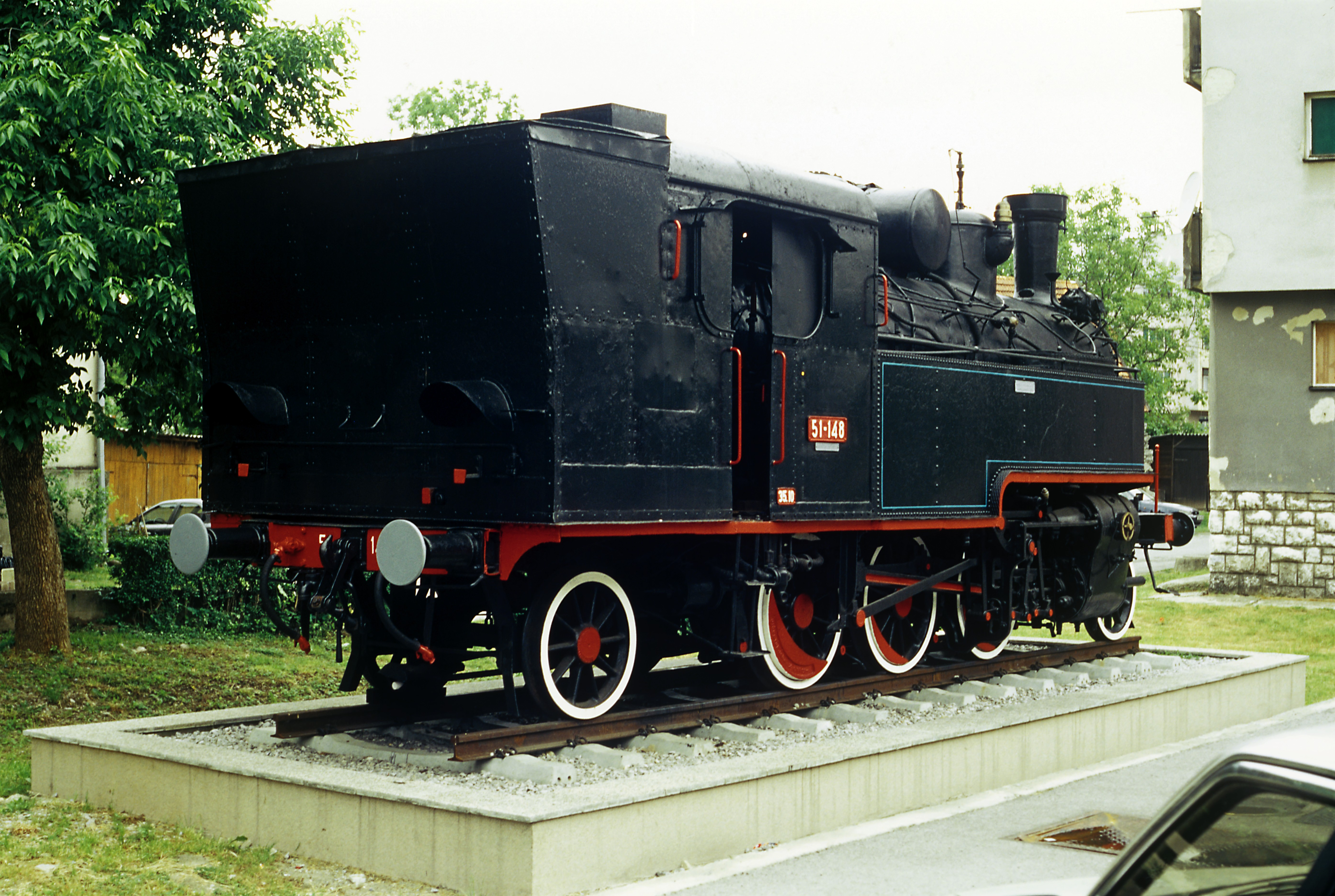

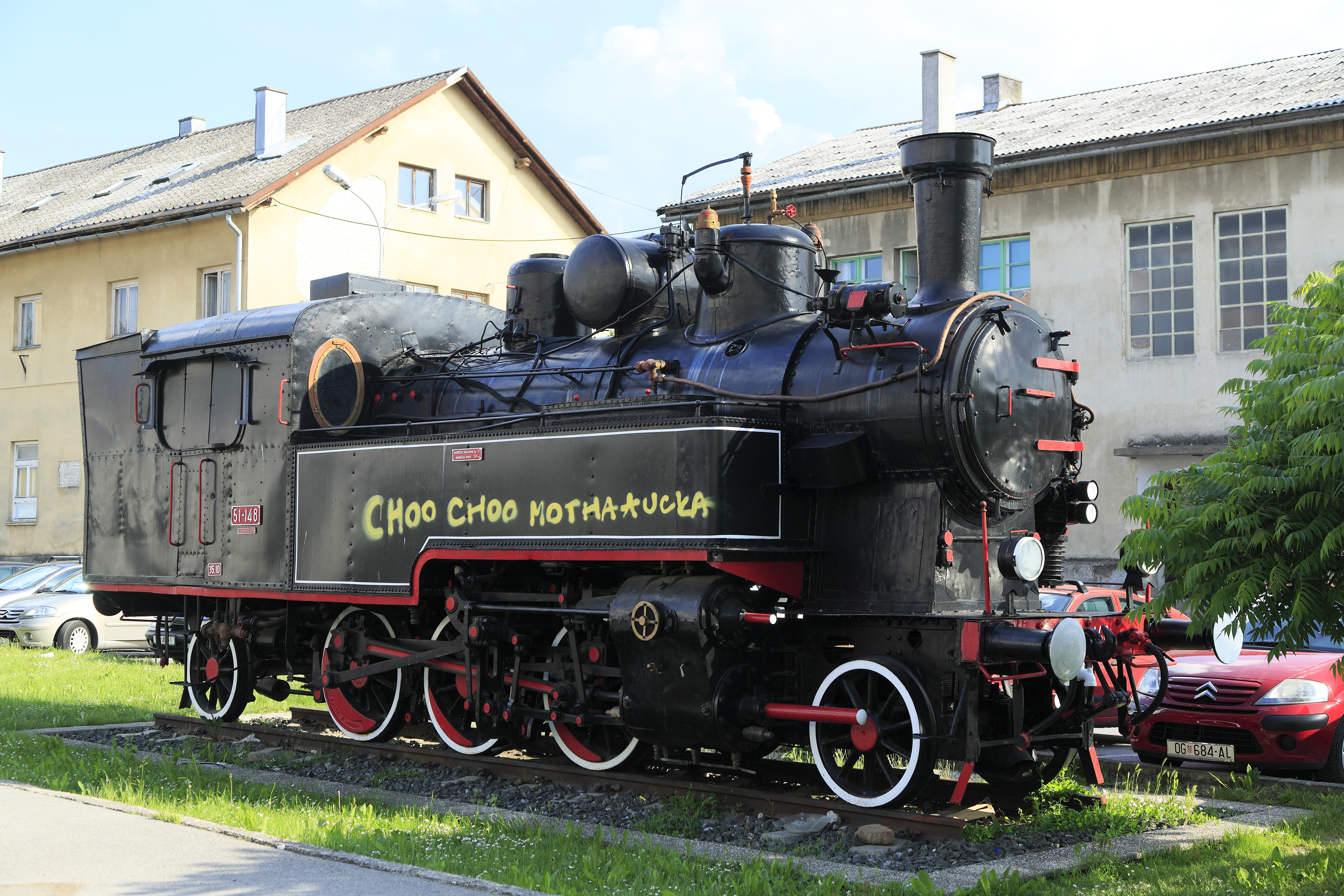

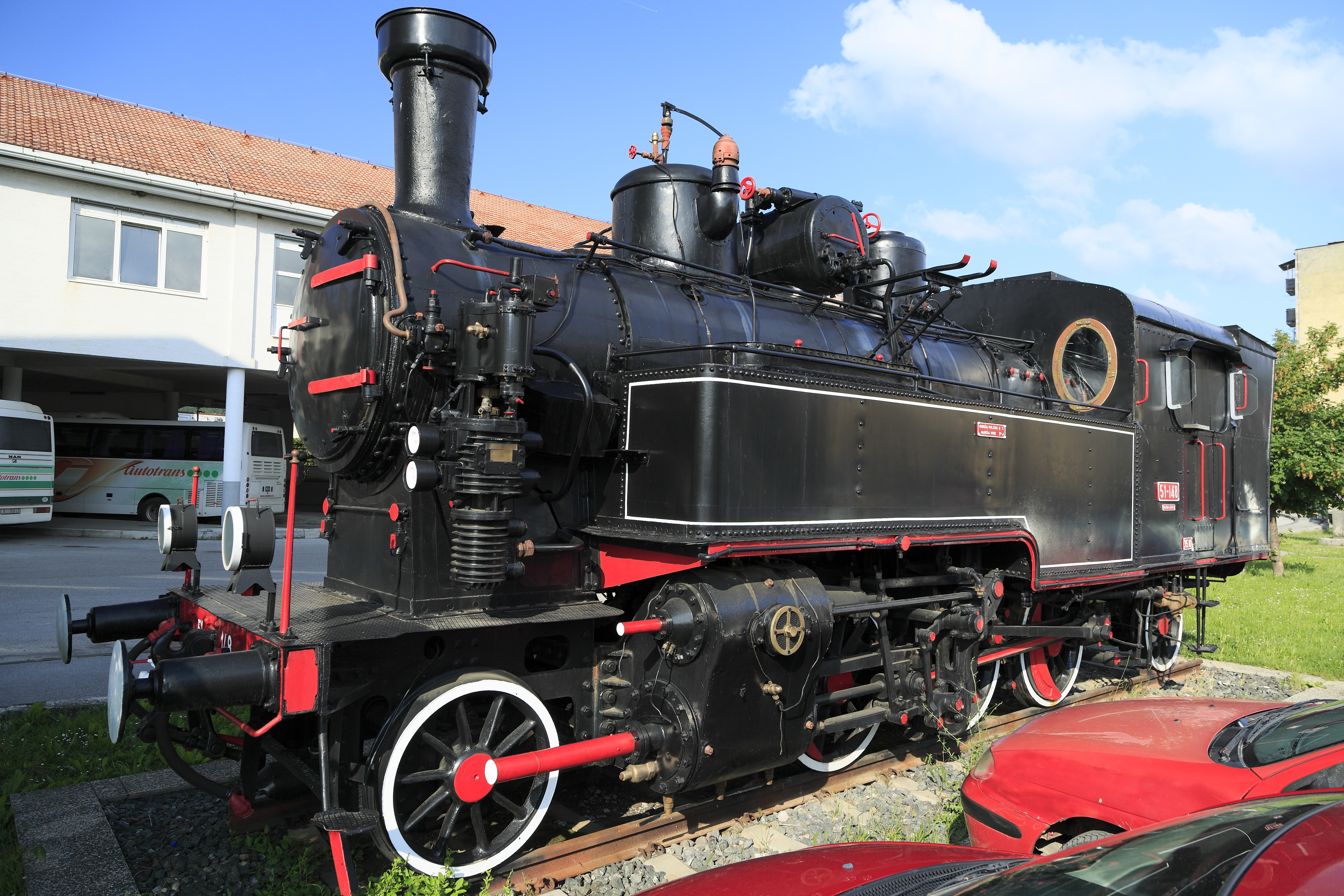

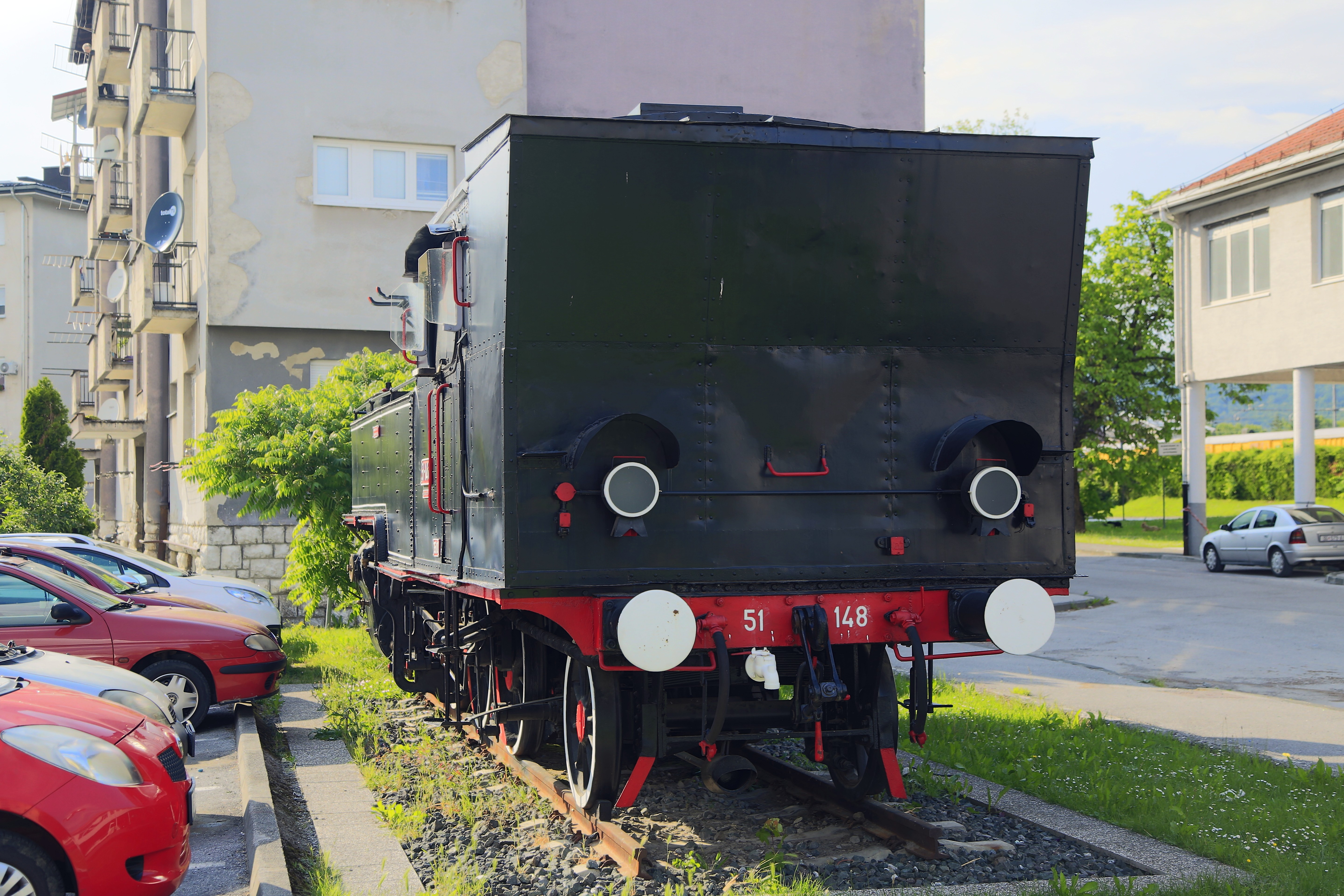

==== JŽ 62-054 ====
- Location: Croatian Railway Museum in Zagreb (HŽM)
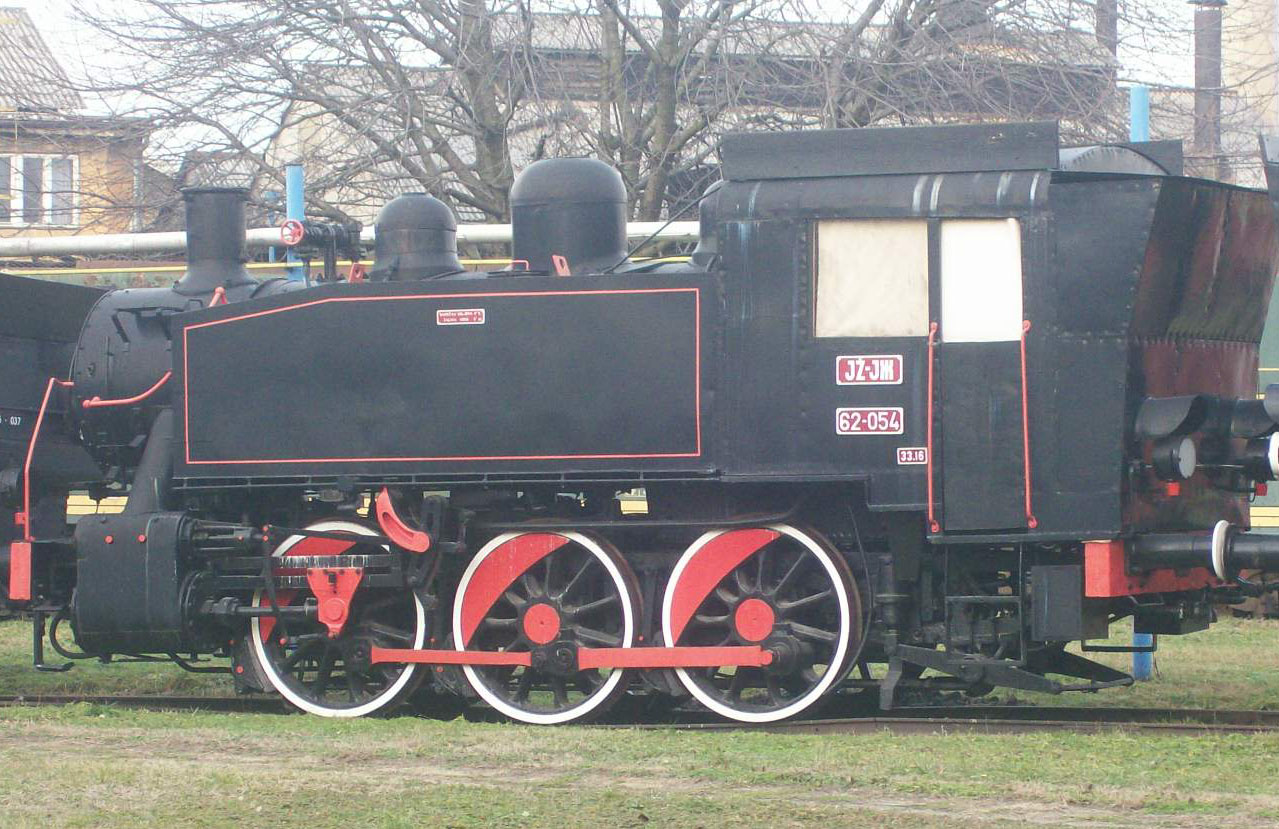
Davenport 2611/44

==== JŽ 62-084 ====
- Location: Gračac, used as a monument
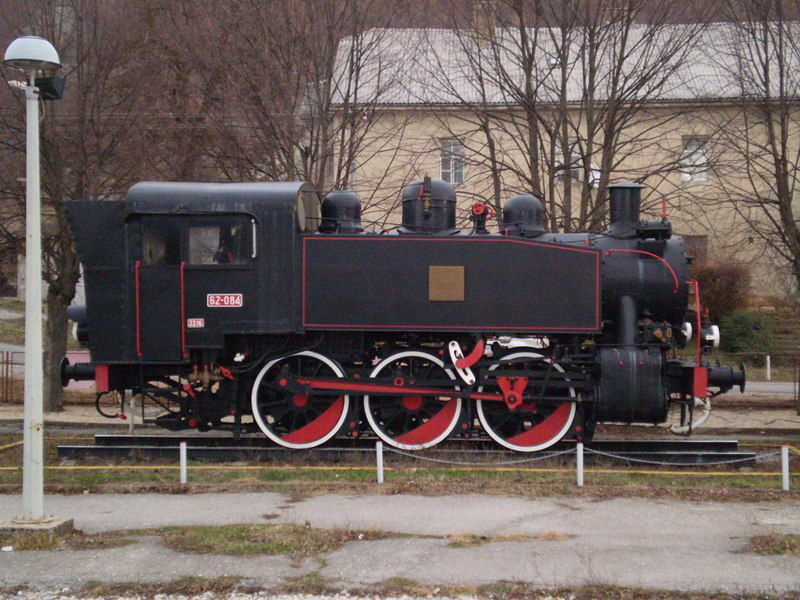

=== Austro-Hungarian era ===
==== JŽ 116-037 ====
- Location: Croatian Railway Museum in Zagreb (HŽM)
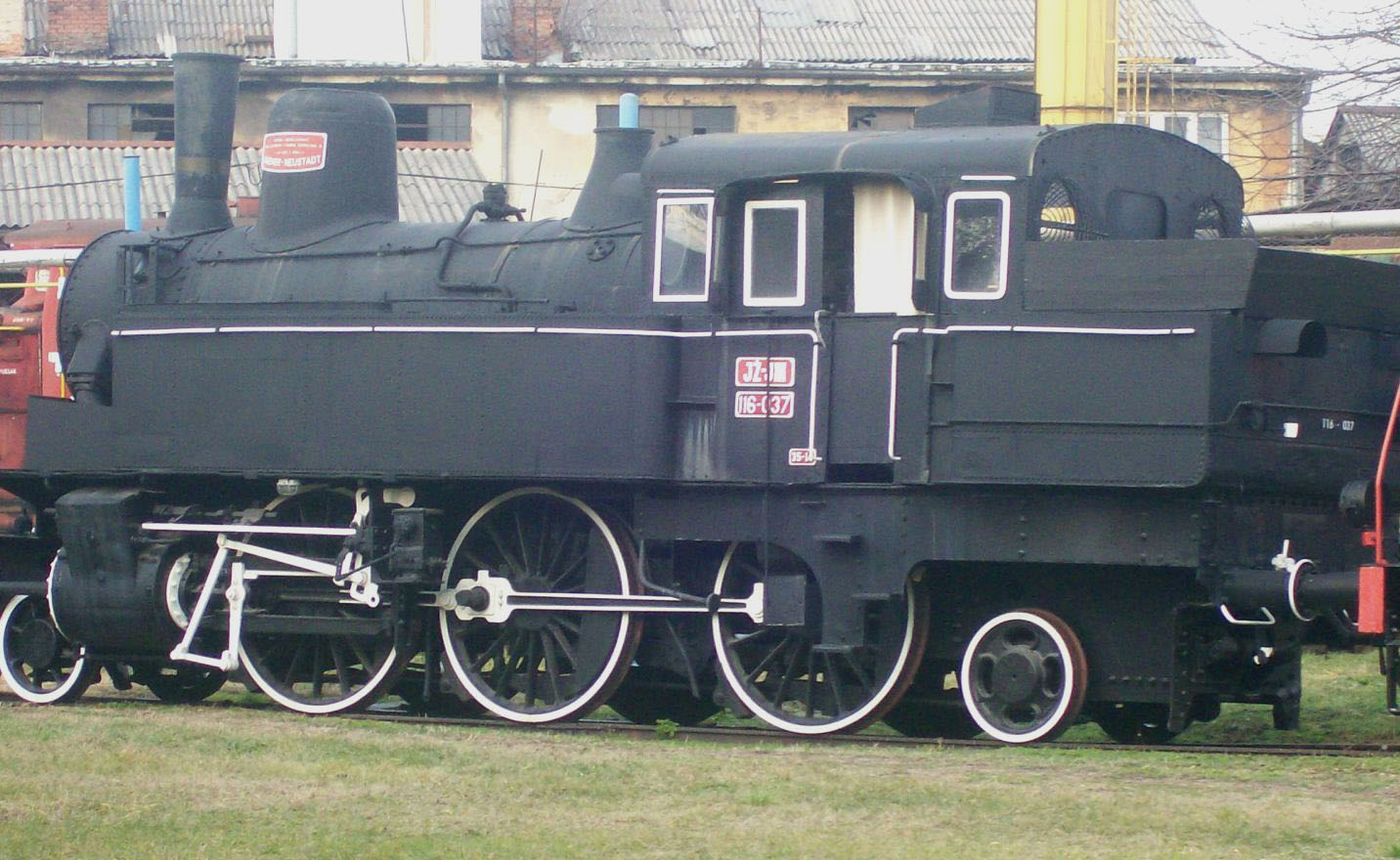
Siegl 4551/04

==== JŽ 125-052 ====
- Location: Zagreb railway station
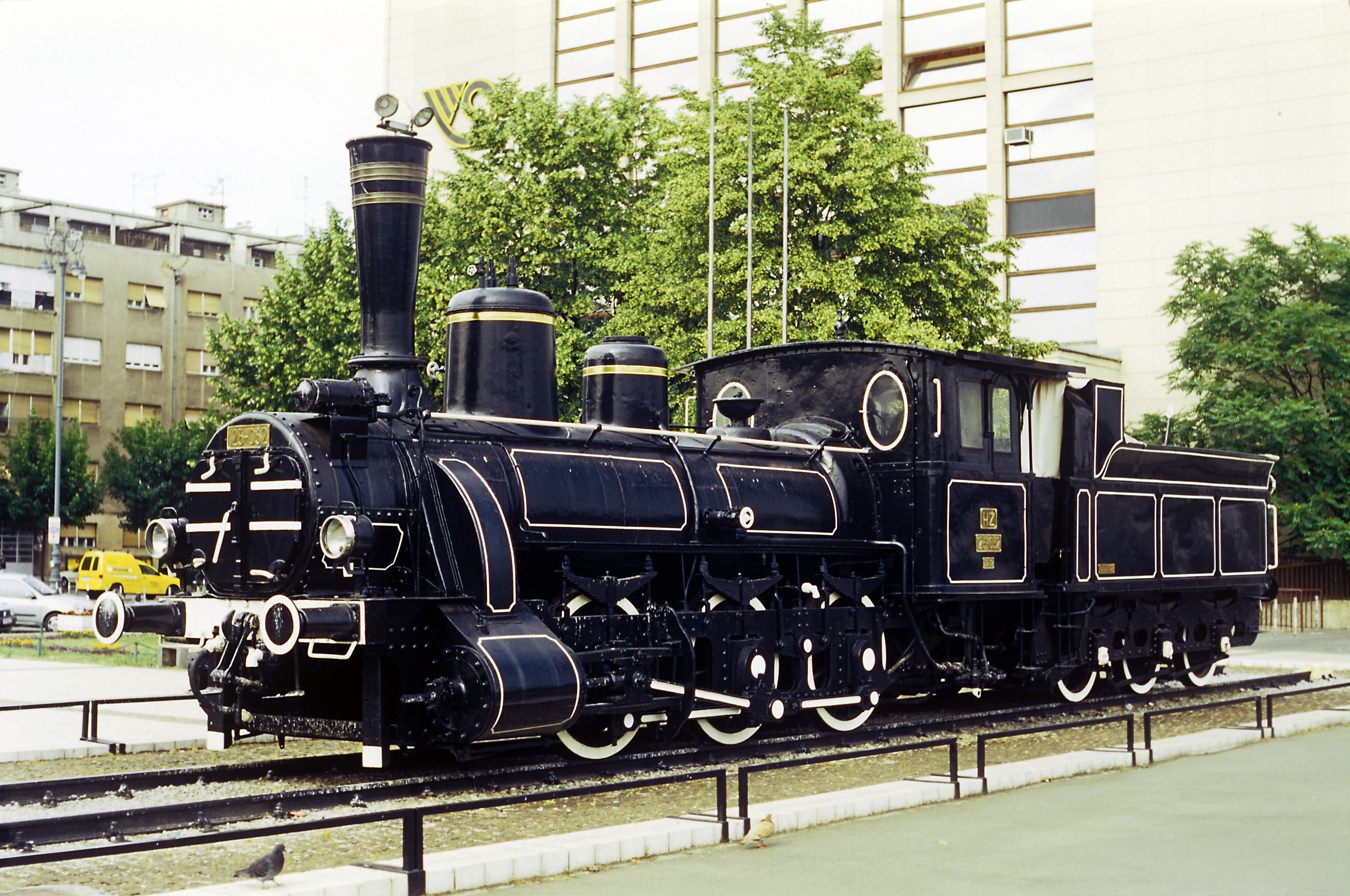

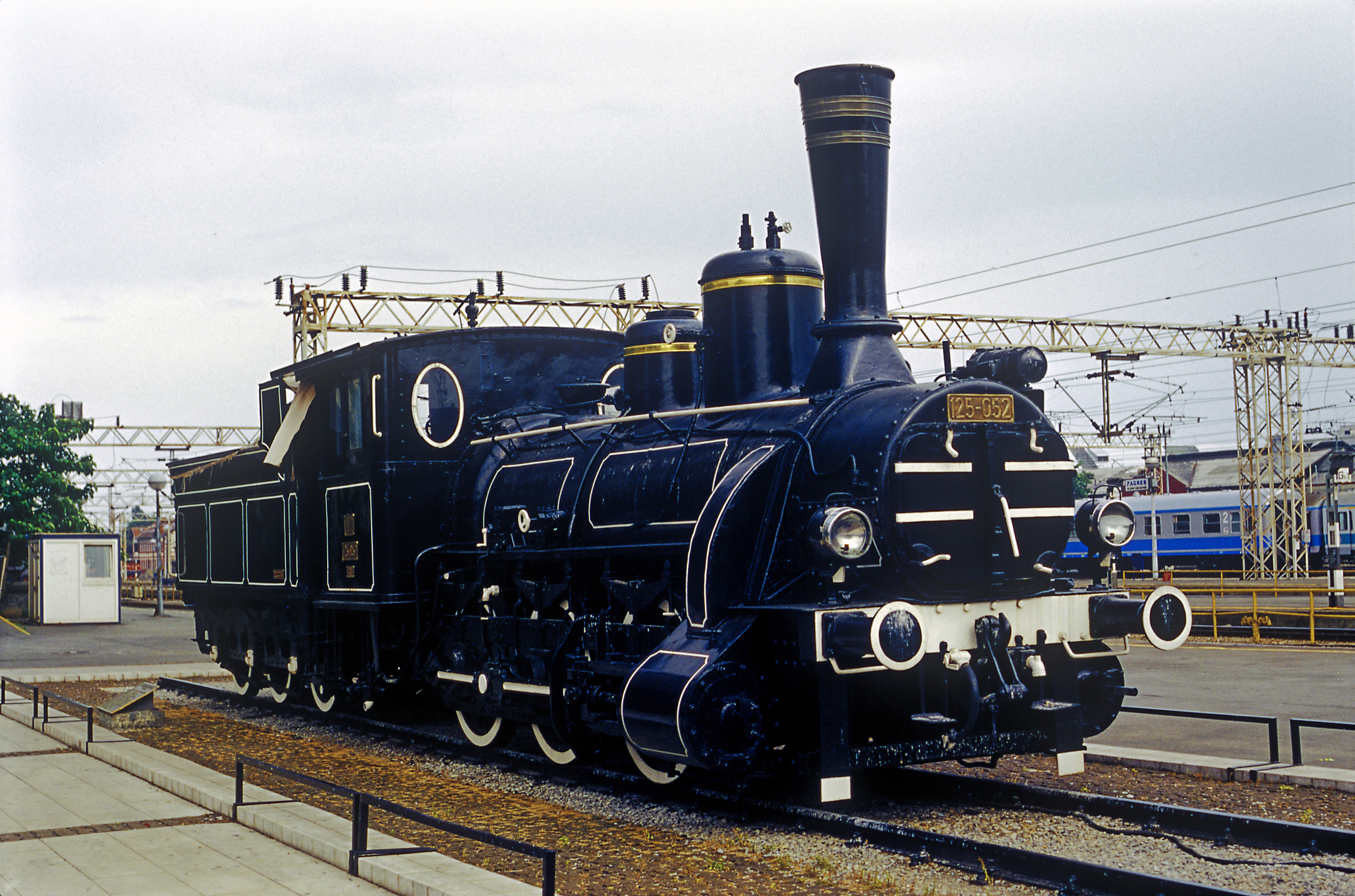

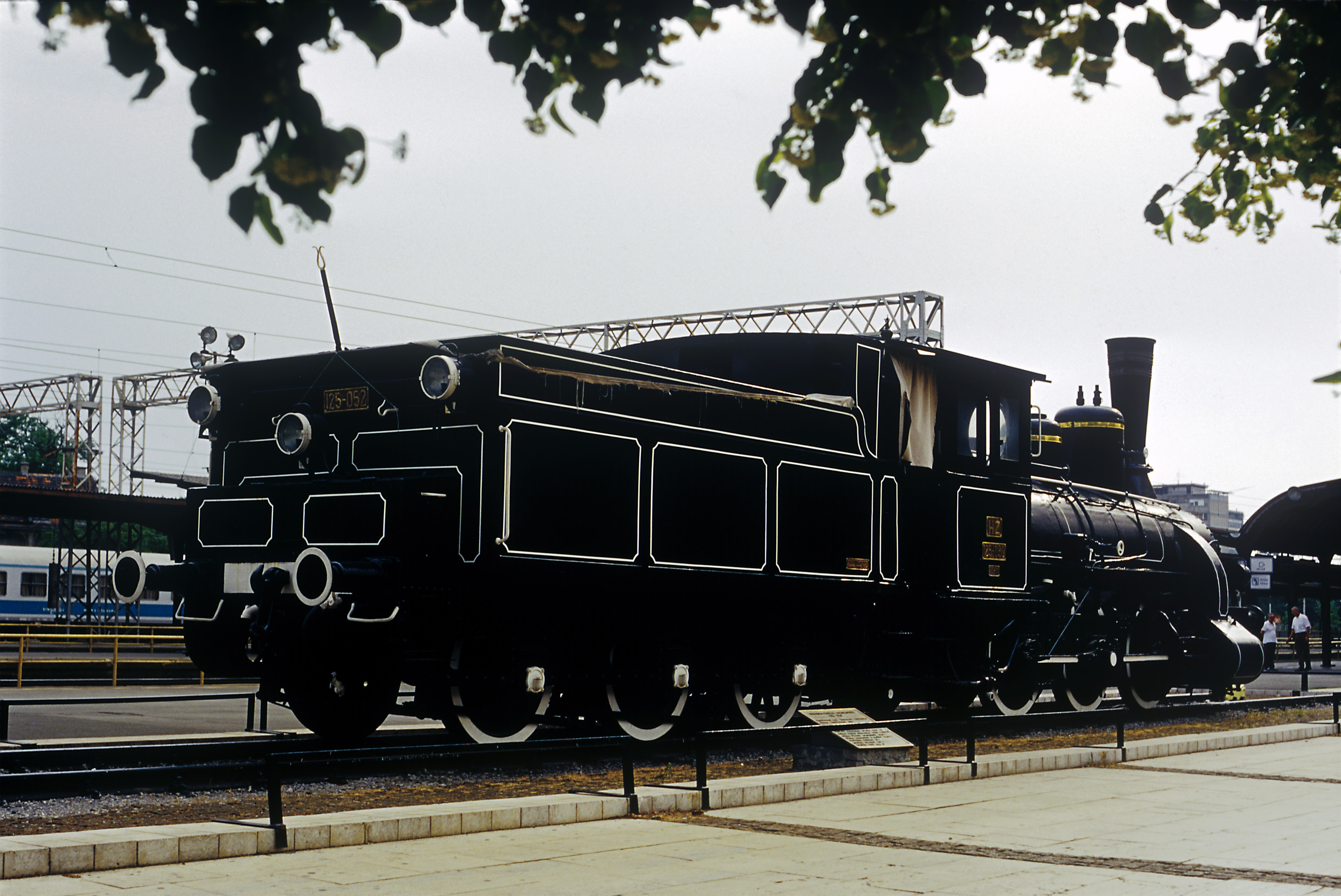

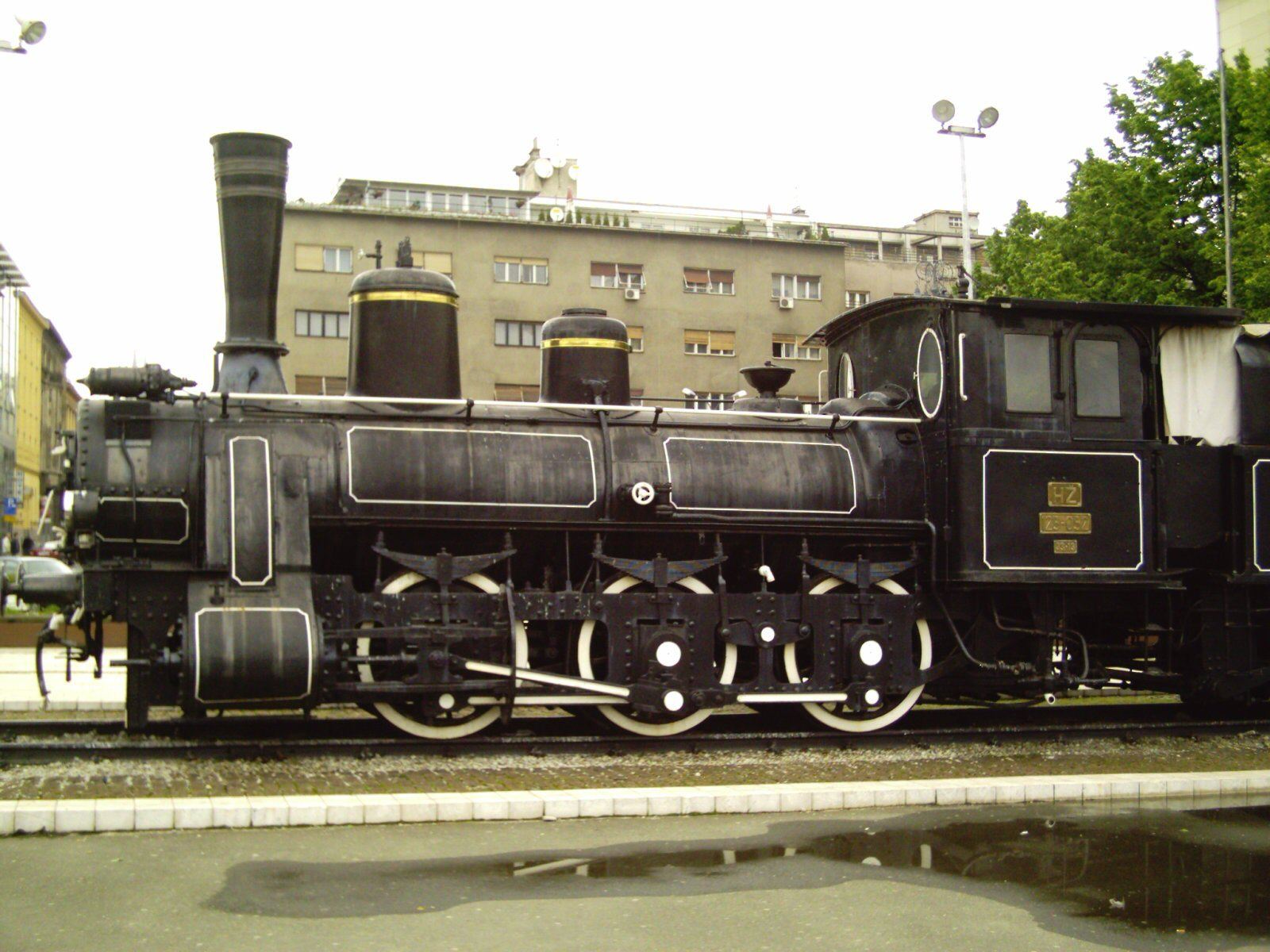
Mavag 653/94

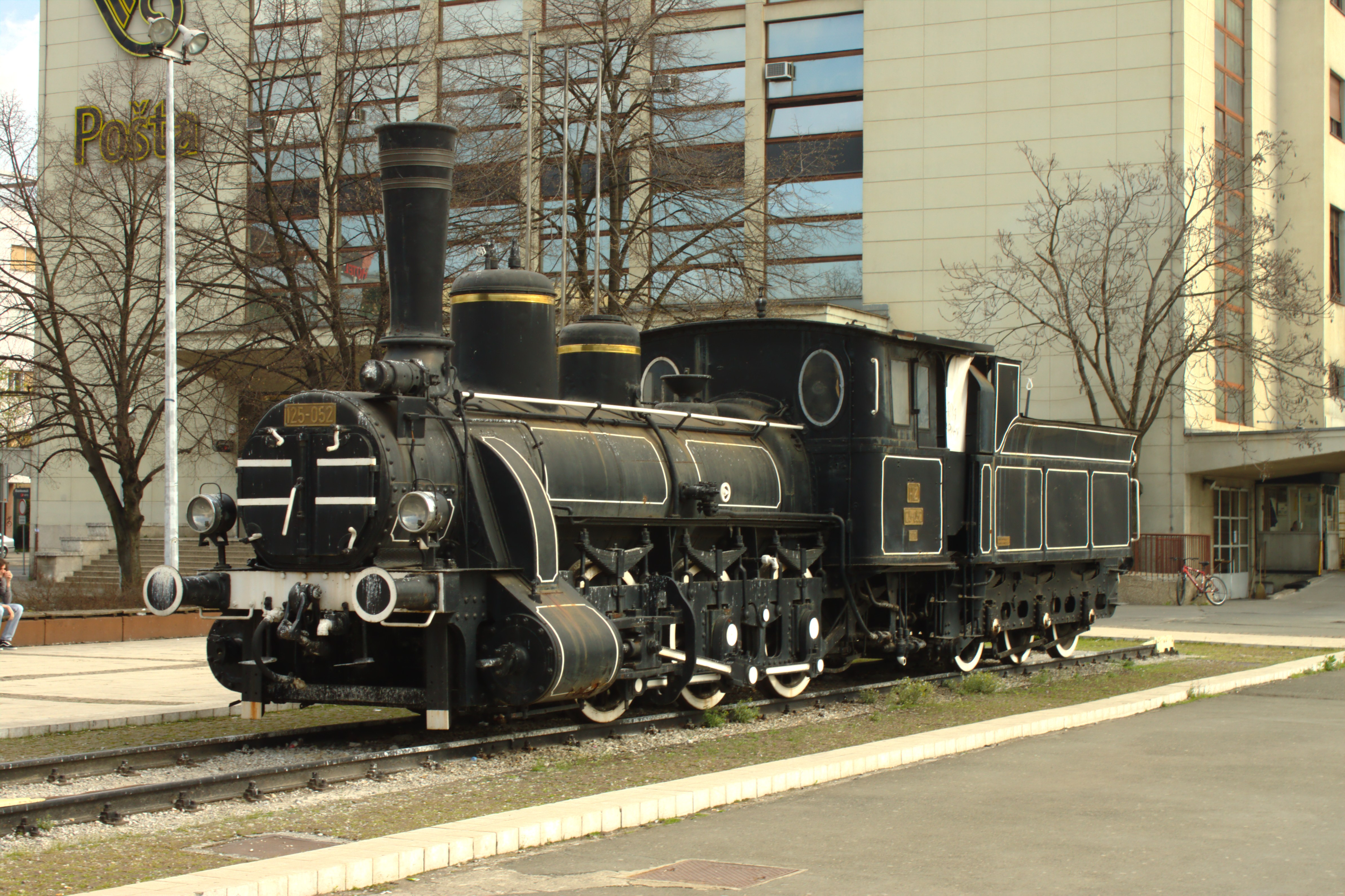

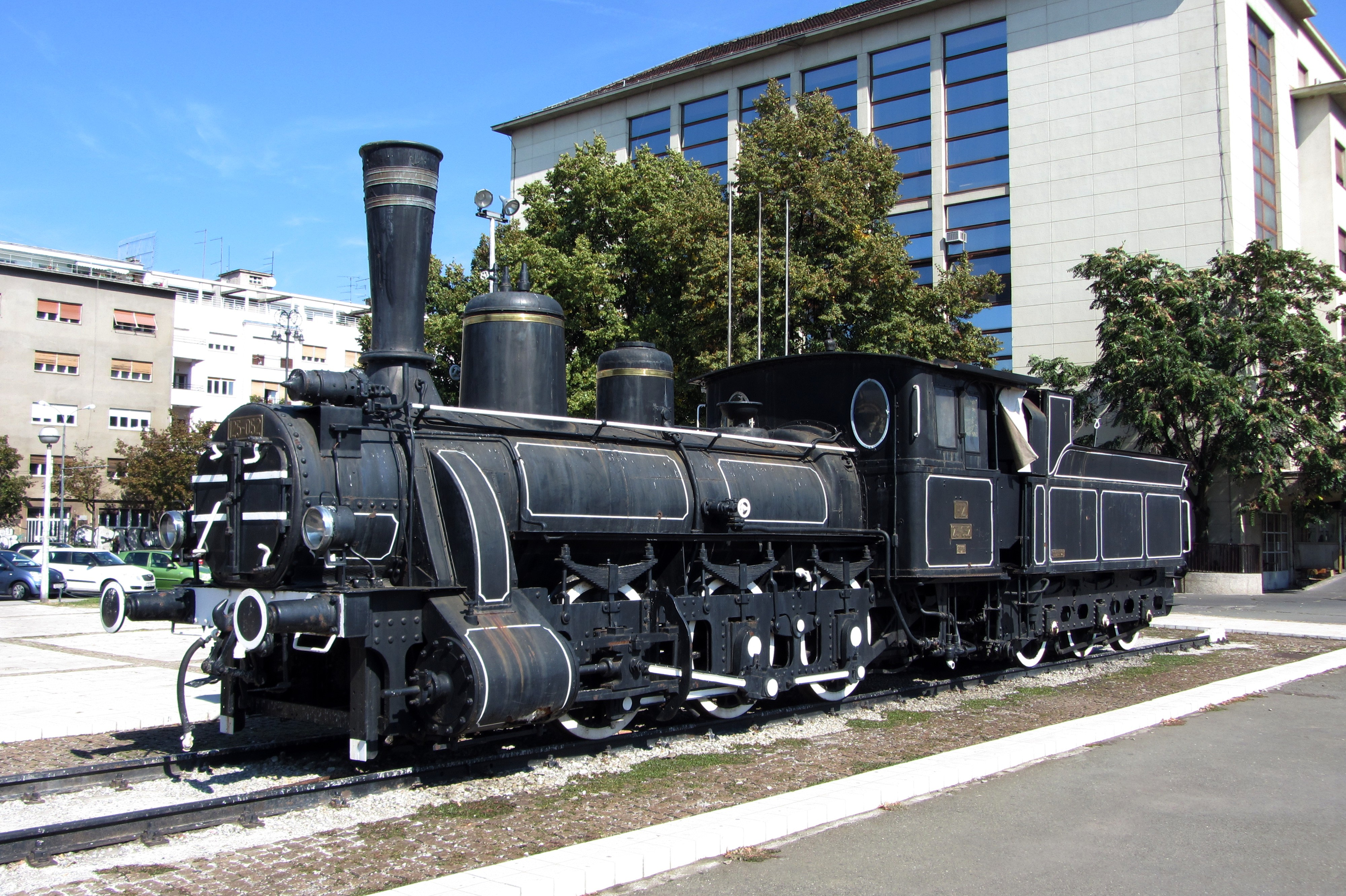

==== WrN 5342 ====
- Location: Puntižela auto-camp near Pula
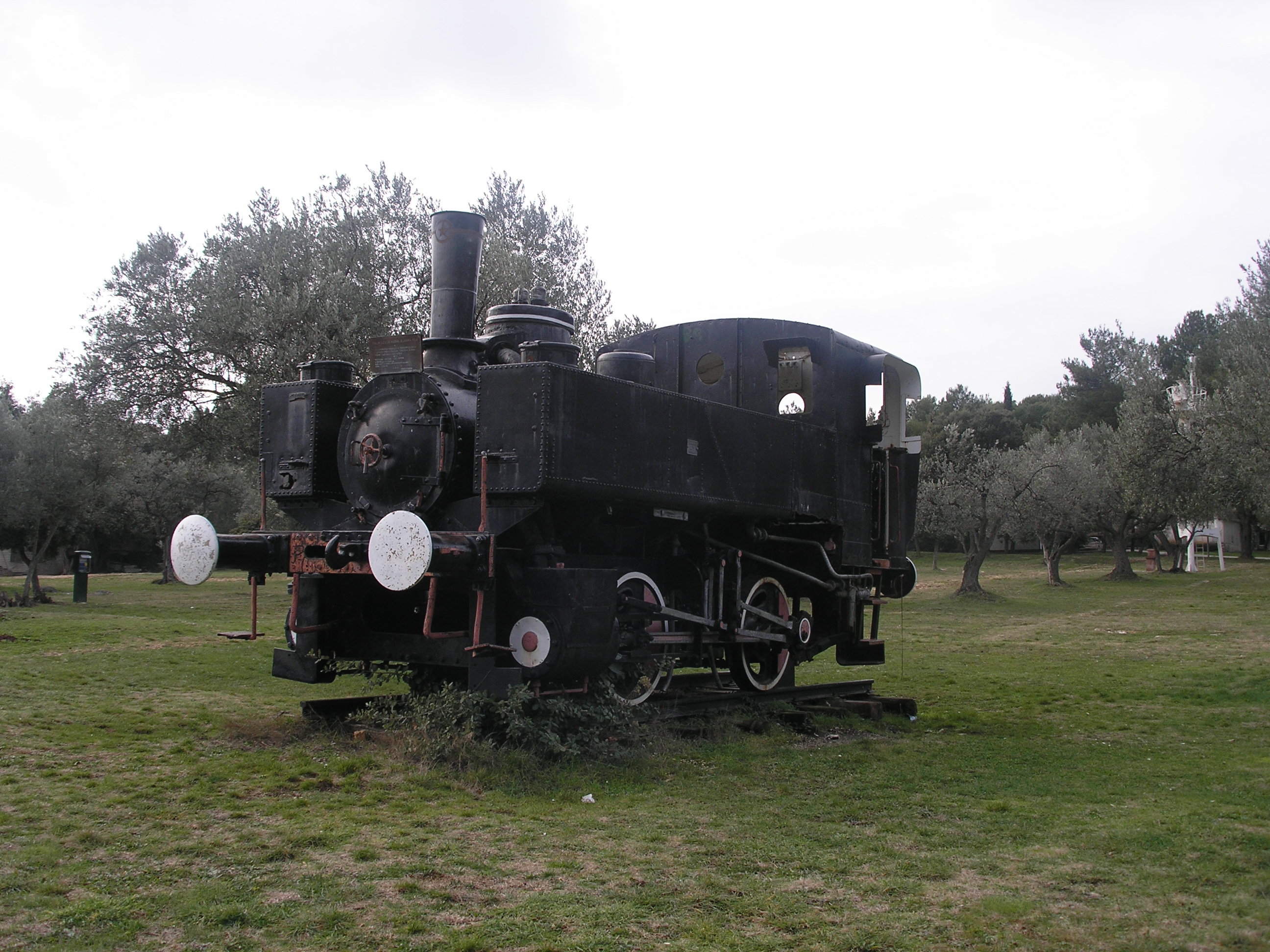

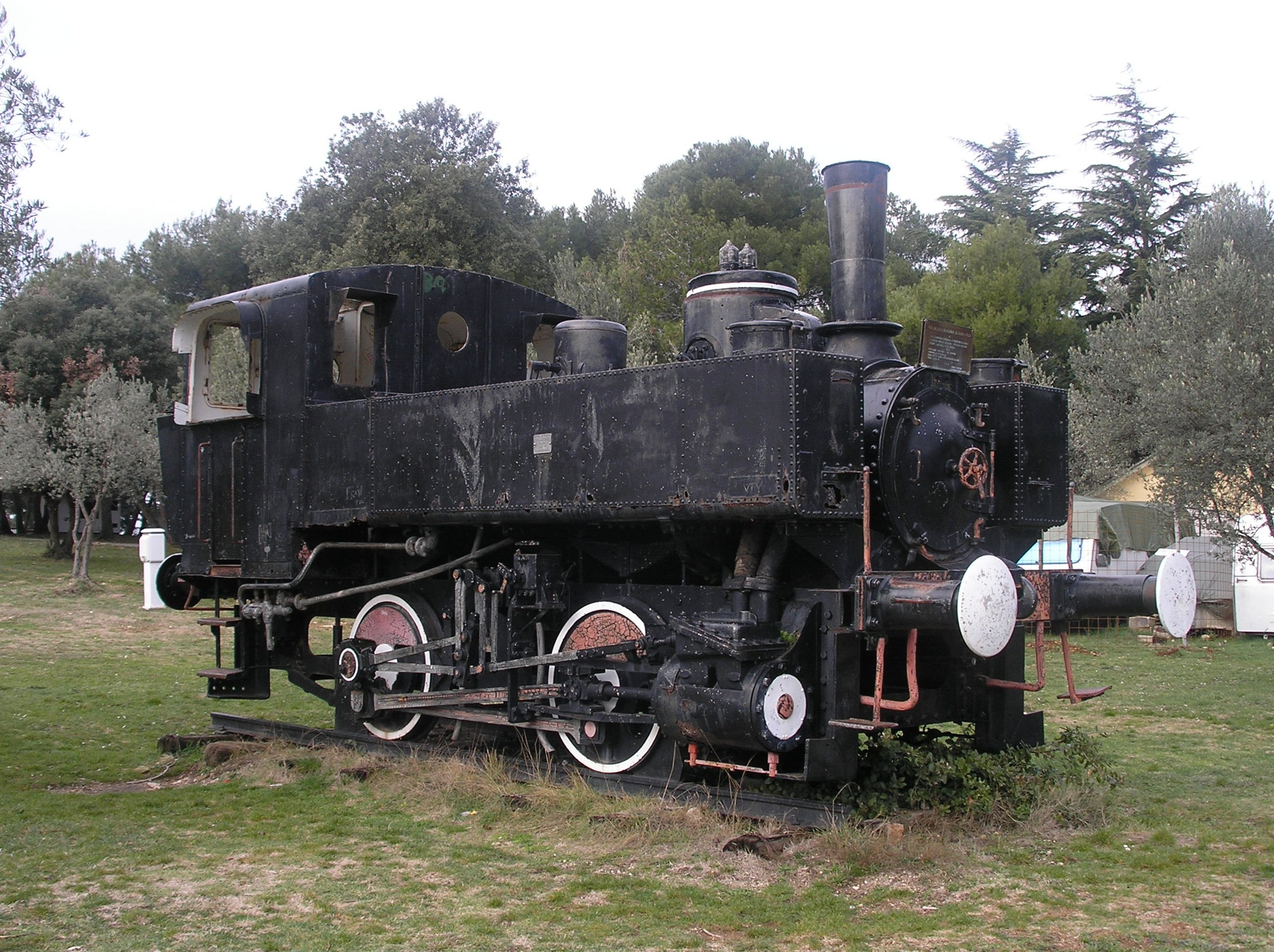

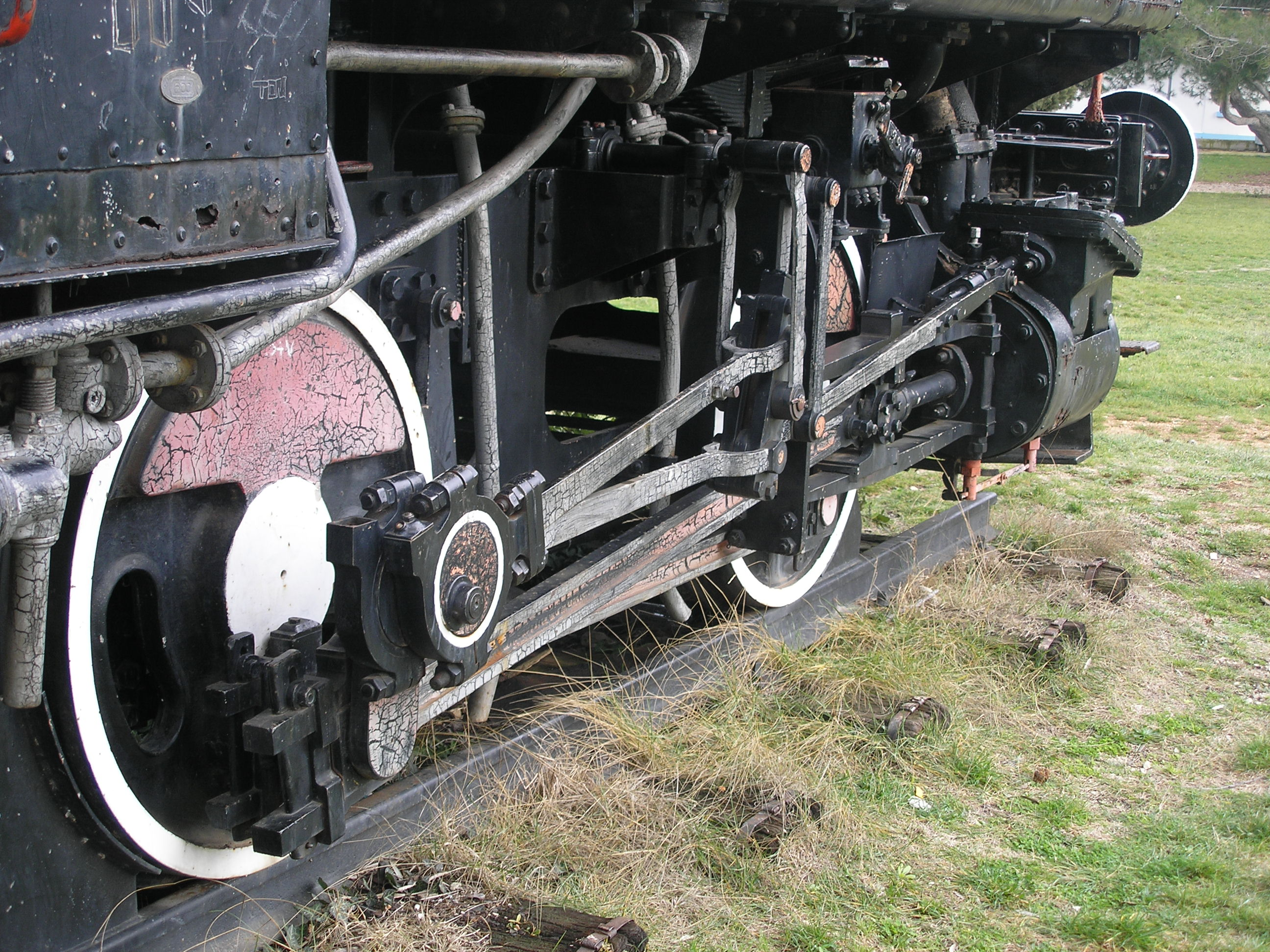
The driving wheels of the engine

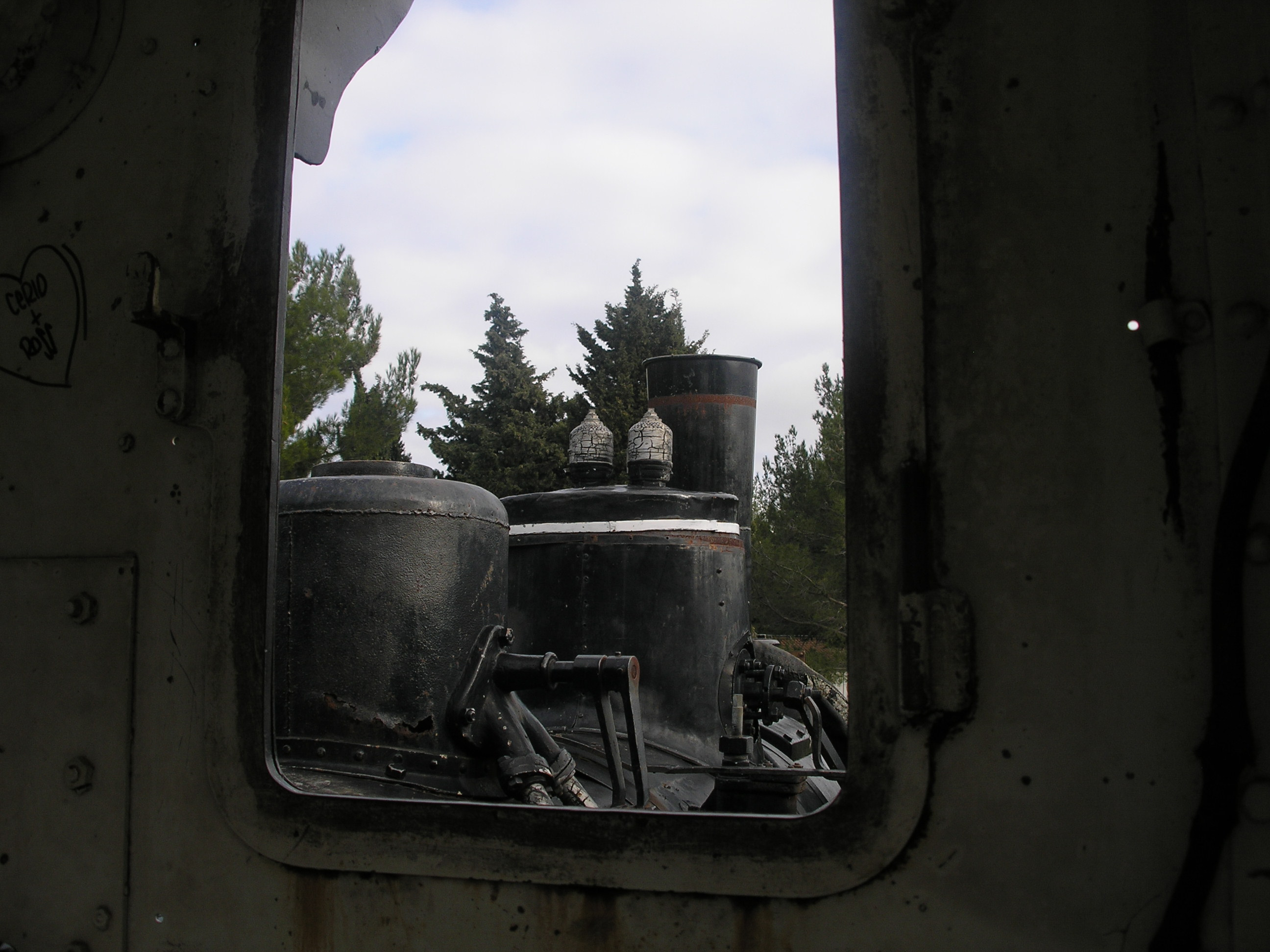
Inside the cab of the engine

==== WrN 5343 ====
- Location: inside Uljanik shipyard, Pula

== See also ==
- Rolling stock of the Croatian Railways
- Croatian Railways
