= SŽ series 664 =

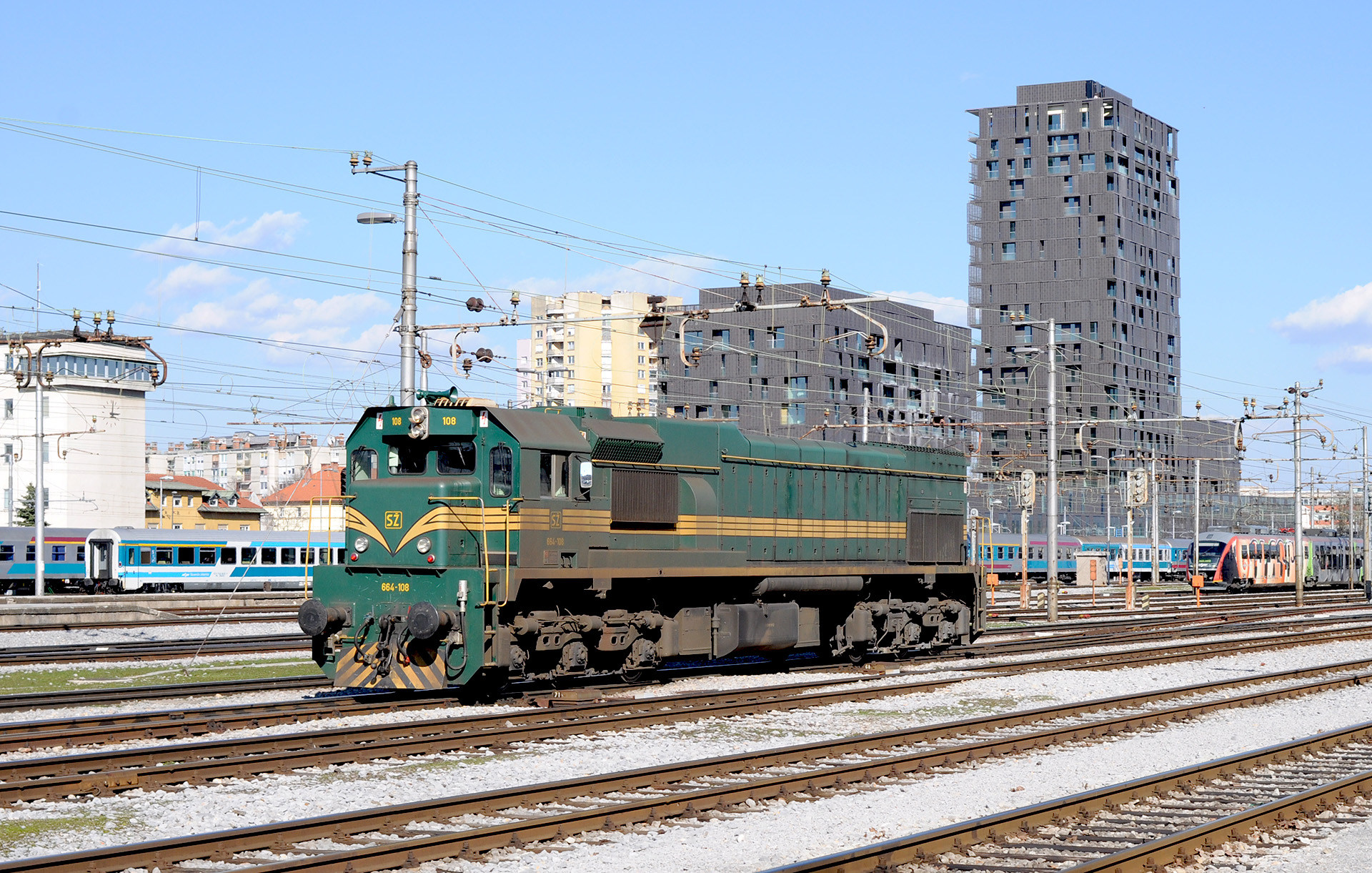
Type and origin
- Power type: Diesel-electric
- Builder: Đuro Đaković
- Model: EMD G26
- Build date: 1984
- Total produced: 20
Specifications
- Configuration
  - AAR: C-C
  - UIC: Co-Co
- Gauge: 1,435 mm (4 ft 8 1/2 in)
- Wheel diameter: 1,016 mm (40 in)
- Length: 16.94 m (55 ft 7 in)
- Loco weight: 103 t (227,076 lb)
- Fuel type: Diesel fuel
- Fuel capacity: 2,840 L (625 imp gal; 750 US gal)
- Prime mover: EMD 16-645E
- Cylinders: V16
- Cylinder size: 9.0625 in × 10 in (230 mm × 254 mm)
Performance figures
- Maximum speed: 124 km/h (77 mph)
- Power output: 1,617 kW (2,168 hp)
- Tractive effort: 242.3 kN (54,471 lbf)
Career
- Operators: Slovenian Railways
- Number in class: 20
- Nicknames: Reagan
- All originally JŽ 664-1 units.

The SŽ series 664 (formerly JŽ series 664, subseries 100), nicknamed Reagan is a diesel locomotive operated by the Slovenian Railways (Slovene: Slovenske železnice, SŽ).

The locomotives are a GM-EMD design, assembled under license by Đuro Đaković in 1984.

== History ==
They were designed by Electro-Motive Diesel from the USA as type G 26 HW-2 and assembled by Đuro Đaković in 1984 and 1985. The first two locomotives were taken over by ŽGP Ljubljana and put into regular operation on 5 November 1984. Eight locomotives were awarded for the towing section in Divača, and twelve for the Maribor draw. It is intended for towing heavy freight and passenger trains on non-electrified lines in Styria, Dolenjska, Istria and The Isonzo Corridor. Traffic with them was carried out on the Pragersko-Hodoš line until its electrification, and during the restoration of the consequences of damage due to ice in 2014, also on the Ljubljana-Sežana line. Recently, they have also been operating on Croatian routes, rented from private companies. Locomotives 664-111, 664-112, 664-101, 664-105, 664-106, 664-114 have been operating in Serbia since February 2021 on behalf of Serbia Cargo.

== Subseries 100 ==
It is an improved type of locomotive JŽ 664 - 0xx (G26C), which is in use in Croatia (today as HŽ 2062). Due to forced charging, they are more powerful, they have an added dynamic brake, an alternator is installed instead of the main generator, and power regulation is continuous. An electric generator with a power of 375 kW / 1500 V is installed to heat up to 10 coaches, so they are also used for passenger traffic. Due to a single cabin, visibility on the line is reduced, so the train is doubled (driver with assistant).
