= Krajina Express =

Krajina Express Крајина експрес
- Type: Armored train
- Place of origin: Republic of Serbian Krajina

Service history
- In service: 1991–1995
- Used by: Army of Serb Krajina
- Wars: Croatian War of Independence; Bosnian War

Production history
- Produced: 1991

Specifications
- Crew: 20
- Armor: 25 mm
- Main armament: 1× 76 mm AT M1A2 gun 3× 20 mm anti-aircraft cannons 1× twin 57 mm rocket launcher 2× 120 mm mortars 2× 12.7 mm machine guns 2× 7.92 mm machine guns 2× 7.62 mm machine guns

The Krajina Express (Serbian: Крајина експрес) was an improvised armored train used by the Krajina Serb army during the Croatian War of Independence and the Bosnian War.

The main battle in which the train became involved was the Siege of Bihać. The train's crew also performed in combat in the role of infantry.

== Background ==
The improvisation of weapons was a common feature of all parties involved in the conflict during the breakdown of Yugoslavia in 1991. As a result, both Serbs and Croats assembled a number of armored trains. The Army of Republika Srpska operated a train that was ambushed and destroyed in October 1992 near the town of Gradačac by Bosnian Muslim forces that included a T-55 tank. The wreckage was later converted into a monument. The Croatian Army deployed a two-wagon armored train built in Split with a shield composed of two plates, one 8mm and the other 6mm thick, with a 30–50mm gap filled with sand between them. The vehicle was armed with 12.7mm machine guns.

== Operational history ==
The first wagon train of the Krajina Express was made of a General Motors diesel locomotive (JŽ 664-013, now HŽ 2062 055) and two cars by local railroad workers at Knin. The cars were initially protected with sandbags. The first operational mission took place in the area between Gračac and Štikada. The usual tactic was to appear suddenly in a pre-established point of the railway, fire its guns and withdraw quickly. The 20-member crew was occasionally re-supplied by small trucks. Following the improvement of the protection with the addition of armor plates, the train provided fire support on the railroad between Knin and Drniš. It was later sent to Lika, where the wagon formation became involved in the battles around Sveti Rok. It is believed that at this time, near the end of 1991, the train was dubbed Krajina Express. In 1992, Krajina Express joined the fighting for the airport of Zemunik, near Zadar. When the train was not suitable for combat operations, the crew fought in the infantry role, like in the course of Operation Corridor 92. By the end of 1992, the unit became incorporated to the 75 Motorized Brigade, part of the 7th Army Corps of Serb Krajina. Two members of the crew were killed by Croatian artillery while fighting on foot during Operation Maslenica, in January 1993. The train provided support during the struggle for Škabrnja, where the unit was involved in an attempt to destroy an ammunition dump in Zadar by pushing a wagon loaded with 3,650 kg of explosives and five tons of shrapnel through the Benkovac–Zadar railway line. The detonator would be a land mine attached to the wagon's bumper. The plan was to let the wagon roll down from the village of Nadin towards the target in the outskirts of Zadar. The results of this mission, if any, remain unknown. In the last days of May 1993, the train was to be involved in Operation "Maslinova grana" (Olive branch), a Serb attempt to break into the Croatian defenses along the Adriatic coast south of Zadar that was eventually called off. In September, Krajina Express was part of the Serb counterattack in the Battle of Medak pocket. One of the last and best documented actions of Krajina Express were a number of fire support missions along the Una river during the Siege of Bihać, on 1 December 1994. The train drew fire from Bosnian troops on Ribicka Glavica hill. The unit was attacked with antitank rocket-propelled grenades and 76mm guns and returned fire with its own 76mm weapon and with a barrage of 57mm rockets. Later on the day, one wagon was hit by a 9K11 Malyutka missile, which pierced the armor shield, but the rubber protection deflected or absorbed the blast. One crew member was wounded by shrapnel. A second missile missed the wagons by 200 yards and hit a derelict building. One source claims that the missile struck the wagon mounting the rocket launcher, while another says that the hit disabled one of the antiaircraft cannons. In the last months of war, the train's activity was hampered by the deteriorating military situation in Krajina. At the time of Operation Storm the Krajina Express was sent to Lika. When its crew realised that the collapse of the Republic of Krajina was unavoidable, they destroyed the train by derailing it into a ravine.

== Armament and armor ==
The two-wagon train was originally armed with a WWII German 20mm gun and two 9M14 Malyutka missile launchers; a Bofors 40 mm gun was added later. A pair of M53 7.92mm light machine guns were mounted to defend the blind spots. The 40mm cannon was removed in 1992 and replaced by a Soviet-designed 76mm gun mounted on the rear wagon. The convoy was enlarged with a third wagon mounting two 20mm cannons. Two Zastava M84 machine guns and a twin 57mm multiple rocket launcher were also added in 1992. The following year marked the definitive configuration of the armored train, when the 76mm gun was supplanted by an American M18 Hellcat tank destroyer. There was an open wagon with two 120mm mortars, but their operational use was limited. The end of the war in Croatia preempted plans to mount an 88mm flak gun.

The sandbags which provided the first shield to the wagons were replaced by a 25mm thick armor plate. The roofs remained open and were covered with tarpaulins. On the sides the wagons were wrapped in canvas and rubber sheets, the in between space filled with gravel. This improvised laminated protection proved effective in combat when it dissipated the blast of an antitank missile.

During the siege of Bihać three additional wagons were hooked ahead of the formation, in order to trigger any mines planted on the railway. One of the wagons carried tools and materials for railroad repairs if needed.

== Specifications (1994) ==
- One armored JŽ 664 diesel locomotive
- Three armored wagons
- Three additional wagons to detonate mines ahead of the main formation
- Tools and materials for railroad repairs
- One M18 Hellcat tank destroyer with a 76 mm gun
- Three 20 mm anti-aircraft cannons
- One 57 mm rocket launcher
- Two 12.7 mm heavy machine guns
- Two 7.9 mm machine guns
- Two 7.62 mm machine guns

== In popular culture ==
Borislav Zorić Ličanin, a Serbian singer from Lika, included the song Krajinom juri ekspres ("Express rushes through Krajina") on his 1994 album Ameriko ne diraj Srbiju, singing about the Krajina Express.

== Sources ==
- Radic, Aleksandar (2008). Историја - Крајина експрес. Арсенал magazine, nº 14, pp. 51–54. Minister of Defence of Serbia, 15 February 2008 (in Serbian)
