= Hasyim Ning =

Indonesian tycoon (1916–1995)

Chairman of the Indonesian Chamber of Commerce and Industry
- In office 1979–1982
- Preceded by: Soewoto Sukendar
- Succeeded by: Sukamdani Sahid Gitosardjono

Personal details
- Born: Masaoges Noer Moechammad Hasjim Ning; 22 August 1916 Padang, West Sumatra, Dutch East Indies
- Died: 26 December 1995 (aged 79) Jakarta
- Party: Golkar (since 1982)
- Other political affiliations: IPKI (until 1973); PDI (1973–1978); Independent (1978–1982)
- Spouse: Ratna Maida Ning
- Children: 2
- Occupation: Businessman
- Known for: Indonesian conglomerate
- Military career
- Allegiance: Indonesia
- Service years: 1945–1950
- Rank: Lieutenant colonel
- Conflicts: Indonesian National Revolution

Hasyim Ning (22 August 1916 – 26 December 1995) was an Indonesian tycoon who owned the Indonesian Service Company, an assembler company that holds a European-American automotive brand license. He was jokingly referred to as the "Indonesian Henry Ford" in the press.

== Life ==
Hasyim was a Minangkabau who came to Jakarta in 1937. However, two years later, he was appointed as the representative of NV Velodrome Motorcars in Bandar Lampung. In 1941, he became a coal mine contractor in Tanjung Enim, South Sumatra. After retiring from the army with the last rank of Lieutenant Colonel, in 1951 Hasyim founded the Djakarta Motor Company. The next few years, through Indonesia Service Company (ISC) Hasyim held the lucrative sole agency for import General Motors cars. In 1961, he—in conjunction with Ciputra, Jusuf Muda Dalam and Dasaad—founded PT Pembangunan Jaya, a construction company. He was later secure contracts of Jakarta's government construction, such as Ancol Dreamland and Senen shopping stores. At that year, he also founded PT Daha Motor, the sole agent of Fiat. Under the New Order era, his business was flourished. In 1977, he founded PT Tjahja Sakti Motor, the sole agent of BMW in Indonesia. This company was later acquired by Astra International.

Hasyim played a leading role in Indonesia's Chamber of Commerce, eventually becoming its chairman (1979-1982). He was maintaining his place in the top echelons of Indonesian conglomerates up until the early 1980s. In 1981, he sold his 49% stake in Bank Perniagaan Indonesia (BPI) to Mochtar Riady. Eight years later BPI changed its name to Lippo Bank, and merged with Bank Umum Asia.
