= JŽ Series 662 =

Yugoslavian locomotive

Đuro Đaković Series 662
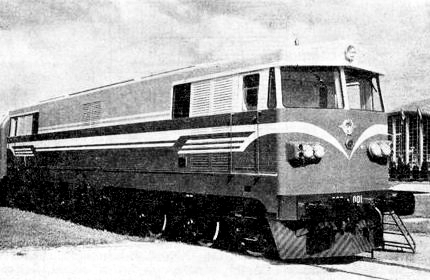
- Series 662
Type and origin
- Power type: Diesel-electric
- Builder: Đuro Đaković
- Build date: 1967
Specifications
- Configuration
  - UIC: Co′Co′
- Gauge: 4 ft 8 1/2 in (1,435 mm) standard gauge
- Loco weight: 96 short tons (87 t; 86 long tons) (?)
- Prime mover: JW 600 (441 kW or 591 hp)
- Engine type: Two-stroke diesel
Performance figures
- Power output: 2× 608 kW (815 hp)
Career
- Locale: Yugoslavia, in modern Bosnia and Herzegovina and Serbia

The JŽ Series 662, manufactured by Đuro Đaković, and nicknamed Nada (Serbo-Croatian for Hope; also a female first name) was the first diesel-electric locomotive produced in SFR Yugoslavia.

The locomotive was used for traffic in Bosnia and Herzegovina and Serbia until 2006.
