= Defence industry of Croatia =

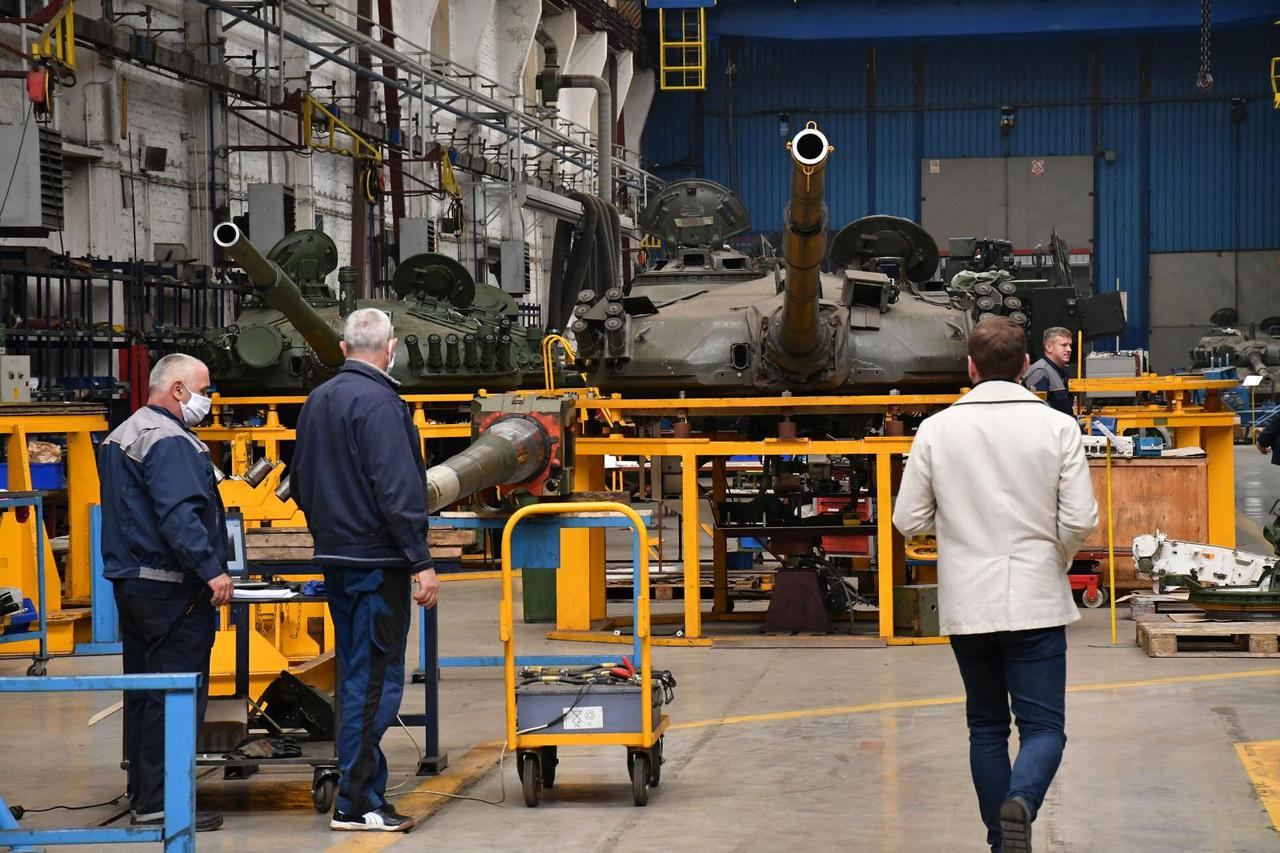
A manufacturing factory of tank turrets at Đuro Đaković in 2024

The defence sector of Croatia is an important part of the Croatian economy and the country's national security efforts. It has expanded significantly since the 2020s due to economic initiatives and regional geopolitical risk. Upon Croatia's accession into the military alliance NATO in 2009, its defence industrial base has focused on expanding production to meet NATO commitments and autonomous drone systems. Protective gear, advanced robotics, demining hardware, and small firearms have historically been the highest-grossing military exports of the sector.

As of 2024, the Croatian defence industry generated €600 million in annual revenue. It exported €167 million in military assets a year later. Through both public and private sector involvement, this sector consists of 100 companies with a labour force of around 5,000. The Croatian Armed Forces and NATO work closely with many defence contractors and manufacturers.

== History ==
Croatia’s has material private sector involvement in the research and development of drone technology. During the 2010s, helmets, assault rifles, advanced robotics, demining hardware, and pistols were the three highest-grossing military exports of the sector. According to Poslovni dnevnik, Croatian companies have entered or expanded military production since the 2020s. A media analysis noted that the Croatian defence output international reach is growing, especially through companies like DOK‑ING and Đuro Đaković, which sign major agreements and cooperate with EU funding mechanisms. The Croatian military has tested Croatian-Estonian technology Vegvisir, a mixed reality digital mapping system that allows for ultra-low latency spatial visibility.

It significantly expanded its military drone program through strategic procurements and domestic manufacturing of unmanned aerial vehicles (UAVs) in 2024. During the 1990s the military was known for its covert aerial surveillance drone program, later becoming one of the first countries to use armed drones in active warfare in 1993. Since 2025, it has a planned annual production of 500,000 combat drones as part of broader European and NATO rearmament. Croatian robotics company DOK-ING was contracted by German arms manufacturer Rheinmetall to produce an advanced reconnaissance drone fleet for NATO countries. In 2024, it purchased six armed Bayraktar TB2 drones from Turkey. In 2026, the city of Osijek hosted a drone exhibition wherein Orqa announced a large-scale drone production facility in the United States, namely in Florida.

== Major defence companies ==
Company	Revenue (EUR, million)	Employees	Main Products
HS Produkt	149.15	1,200–1,500	Small arms, pistols, submachine guns, VHS bullpup rifle
DOK‑ING	70.69	230	Unmanned ground vehicles, MV‑8 Komodo UGV, mine‑clearing machines, electric vehicles
Orqa	12	50–100	FPV drones, drone controllers, goggles
Šestan‑Busch	18	300	Ballistic protection: helmets, body armor, vests
KING ICT	110,35	800	Cybersecurity solutions, communications systems, SIEM, unmanned aerial vehicles
Đuro Đaković	133.8	1,000–1,500	Bradley IFV modernization, Patria AMV 8×8 production, M‑95 Degman MBT, M-84 MBT
Brodosplit	120	2,300	Shipbuilder, offshore patrol vessels, naval programme

== Economic impact ==
The Croatian defence industry generated €600 million in annual revenue in 2024. It exported €167 million in military assets a year later. From 2020 to 2023, the value of military exports grew from €111 million to €153 million. Through both public and private sector involvement, this sector consists of 100 companies with a labour force of around 5,000. The Croatian Employers’ Association reported that revenues of companies in the Croatian defence industry cluster reached €401 million in 2023.

== Gallery ==
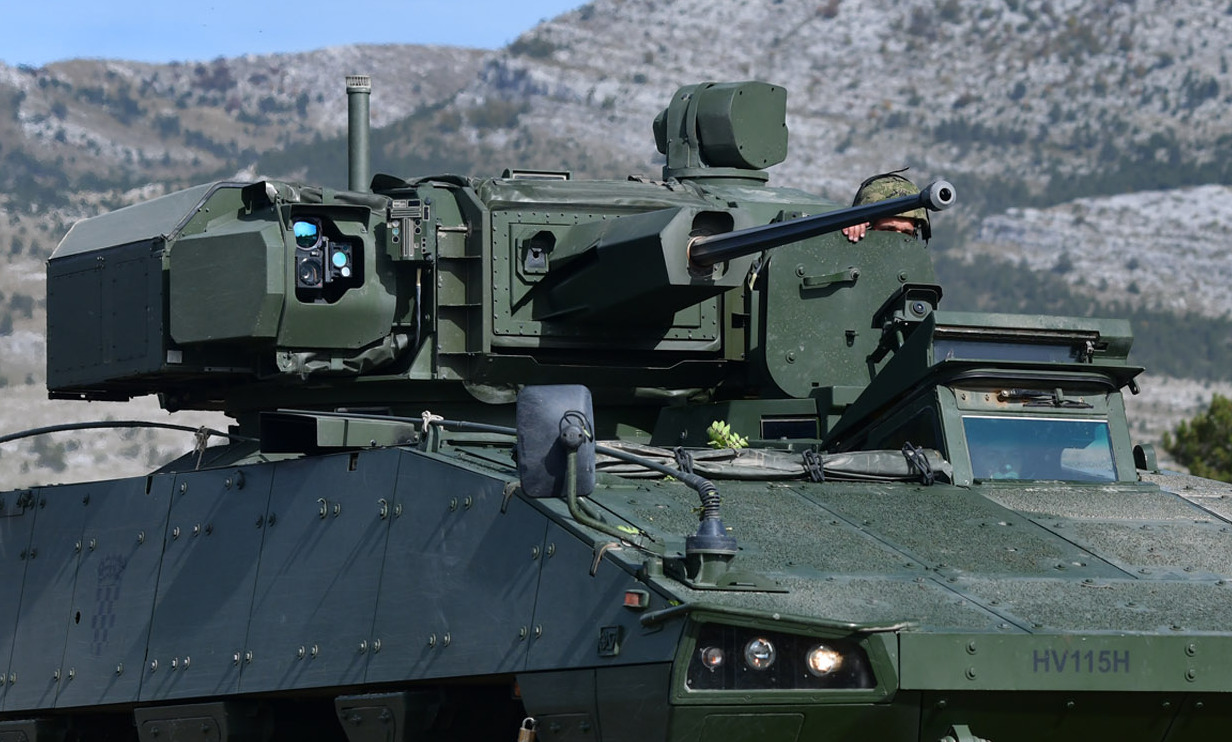
Patria CRO30L IFV produced (Đuro Đaković)

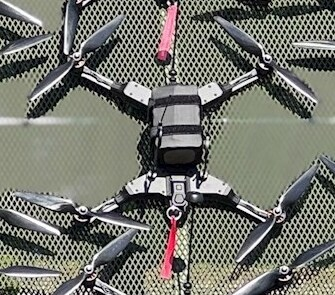
Autonomous drones (Orqa)

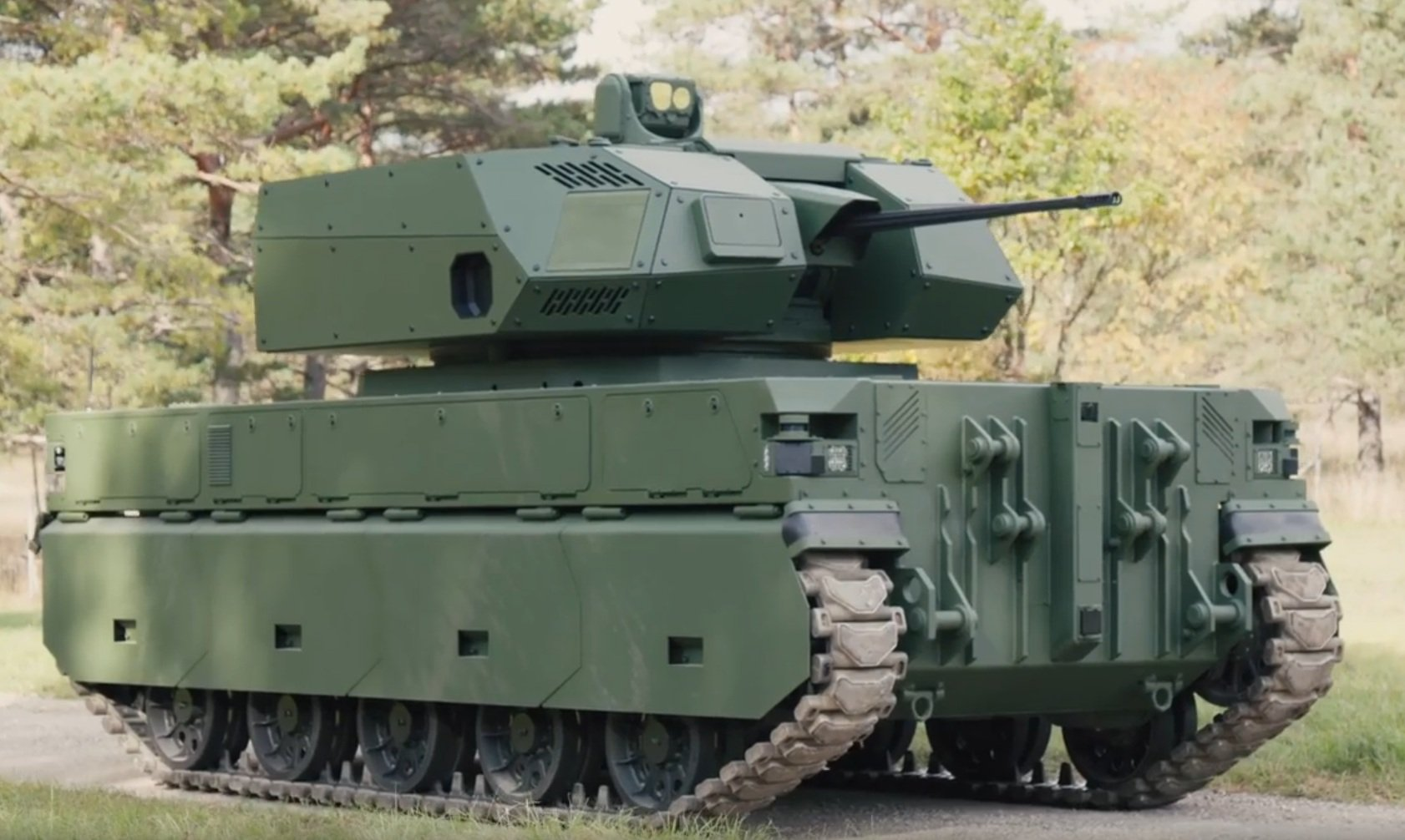
MV-8 Komodo Mangart 25AD (DOK-ING)

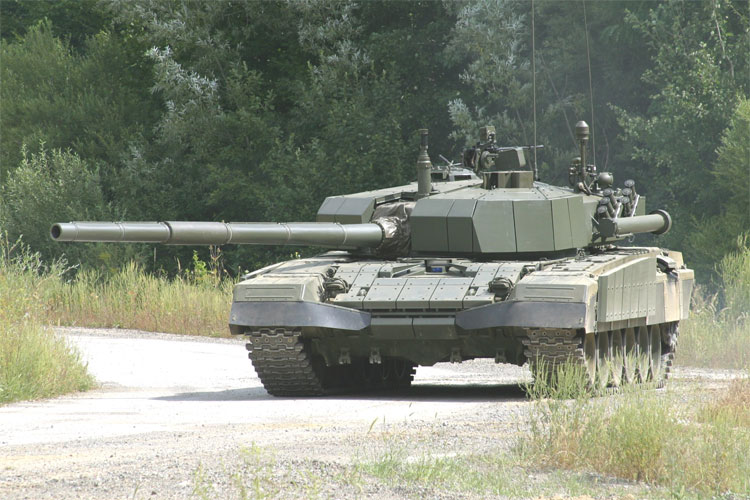
M-95 Degman MBT (Đuro Đaković)

== See also ==
- Military–industrial complex
- 2020s European rearmament
