= Orqa =

Croatian FPV drone company

Orqa d.o.o
- Type: Private
- Industry: Defense; Technology
- Founded: 2018; 8 years ago
- Founders: Ivan Jelušić; Srđan Kovačević; Vlatko Matijević
- Headquarters: Osijek, Croatia
- Area served: Global
- Key people: Srđan Kovačević (CEO)
- Products: Unmanned aerial vehicles First-person view goggles and electronics
- Revenue: ▲€24.16 million (2025)
- Number of employees: ▲127 (2025)
- Website: orqafpv.com

Orqa is a Croatian manufacturer of drone systems and first-person view (FPV) technical equipment headquartered in Osijek, Croatia. Since the 2020s, firm became a significant defense contractor in Croatia, and it has expanded production, manufacturing, and collaboration with other manufacturers throughout Europe, Asia and the United States.

== History ==
Orqa was founded by the trio Srđan Kovačević, Ivan Jelušić and Vlatko Matijević in late 2018. The company's initial product were the FPV.One goggles, released to the consumer market, intended for piloting drones, and marketed as having better specifications than its competitors. Around the same time, it also began producing drones for racing purposes.

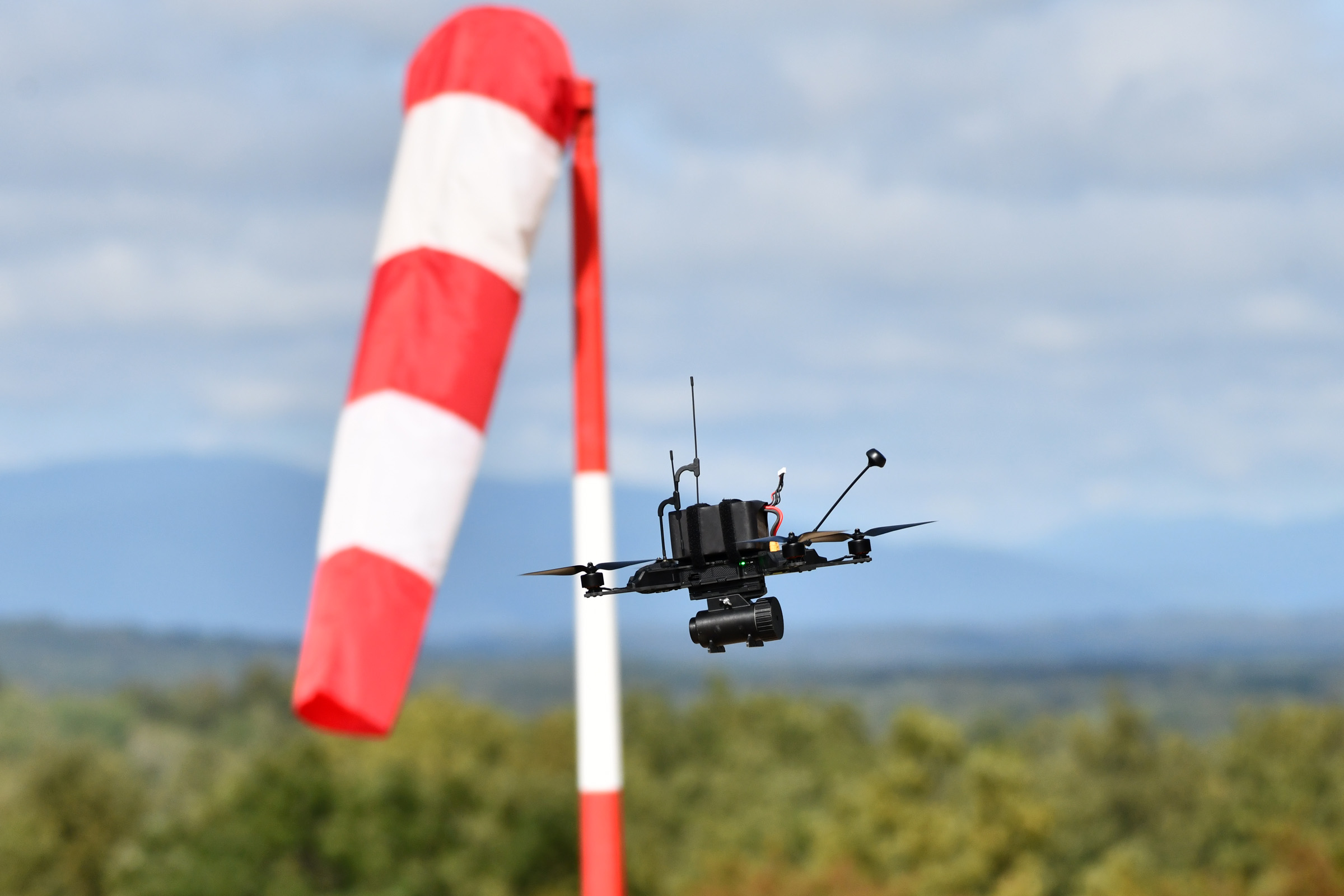
An Orqa drone in flight, 2025

In 2023, Orqa acquired ImmersionRC, a Swiss producer of FPV electronics. During May of the same year, the company was involved in an incident, where its FPV goggles were bricked as a result of a third-party software issue, claimed as a result of either an unpaid license, or ransomware.

In 2024, it received a $5.8 million investment from Lightspeed Venture Partners. It entered into a partnership with Baykar, where the companies plan to integrate Orqa's FPV drones to be carried by Baykar Bayraktar TB2 UAV. It also partnered with DOK-ING in developing manned-unmanned teaming (MUM-T) technologies for dual-use applications.

In 2025, it was reported that it was a supplier of drones for the United States Department of Defense, however the purchases from the company were halted after it was discovered that one radio module contained within the drones had been manufactured in China. The CEO stated that the manufacturing of the module had been moved in-house in the meantime. The Croatian Army ordered FPV MRM-2 Interceptor drones for €10 million. The drones were also purchased to be used by the Armed Forces of Ukraine.

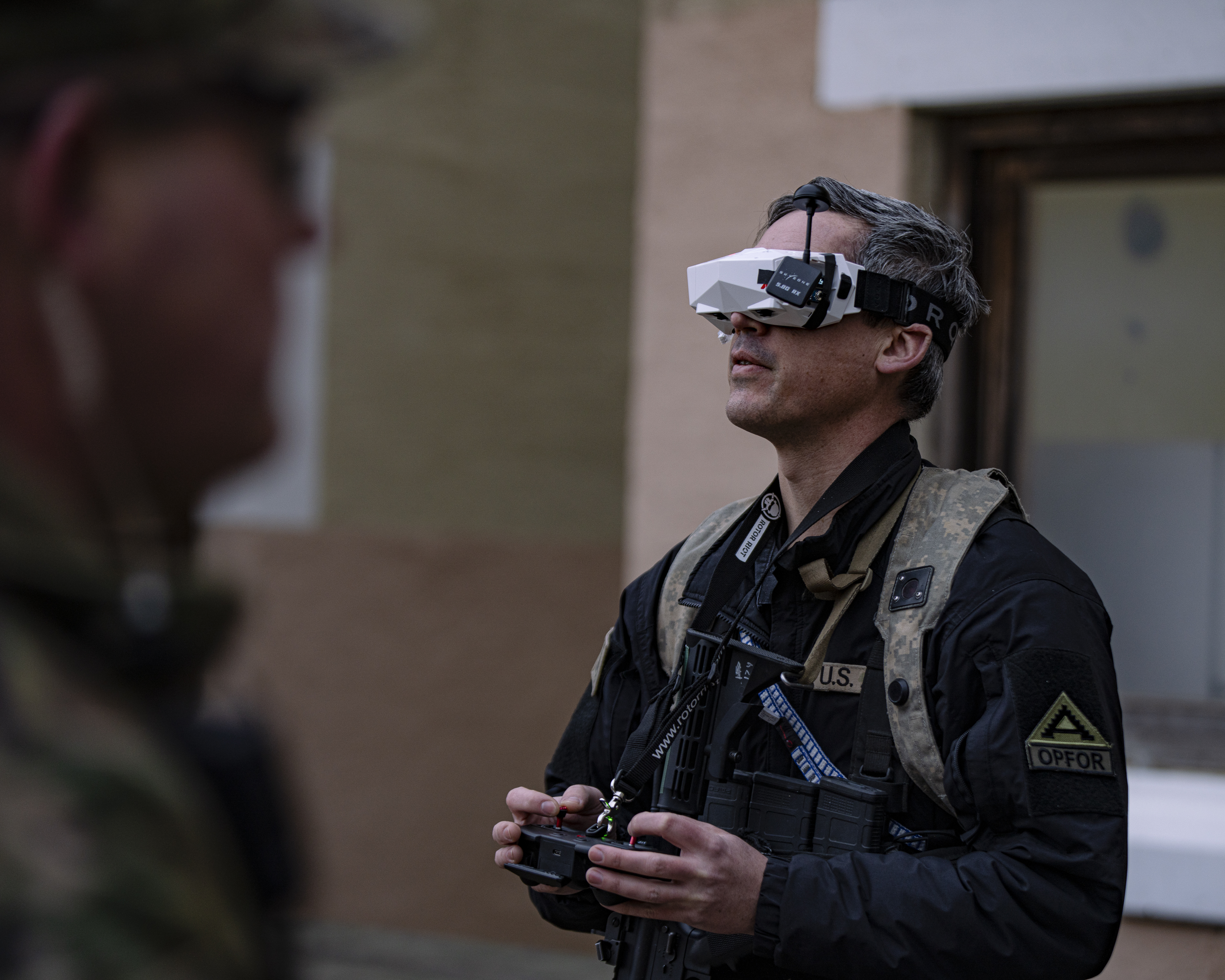
Orqa goggles and controller in use

During the same year, it has expanded its production capacity to 280,000 drones annually at its main production facility in Osijek, and subsequently launched a Global Manufacturing Partnership Program, where it aims to reach a million drones annually in cooperation with its partners around the globe. For this purpose, in 2026, it signed cooperation agreements with companies in Qatar, Ukraine , US and Canada.

Together with By Light Professional IT Services, it launched a US-based spinoff company, Orqa US, which oversees a localized production of Orqa's drones in the US. A 17,000 square metre production facility was set up for this purpose in Port Orange, Florida.

In June of 2026, it unveiled MRM2-10AI, a hybrid drone operated both through fiber optic cables and radio control (Orqa’s proprietary “IRONghost” system). The drone will also feature onboard AI processing and image-based navigation which will switch between the two control methods depending on disruption and other circumstances on the battlefield.

== See also ==
- Defence industry of Croatia
