= Đuro Đaković Series 732 =

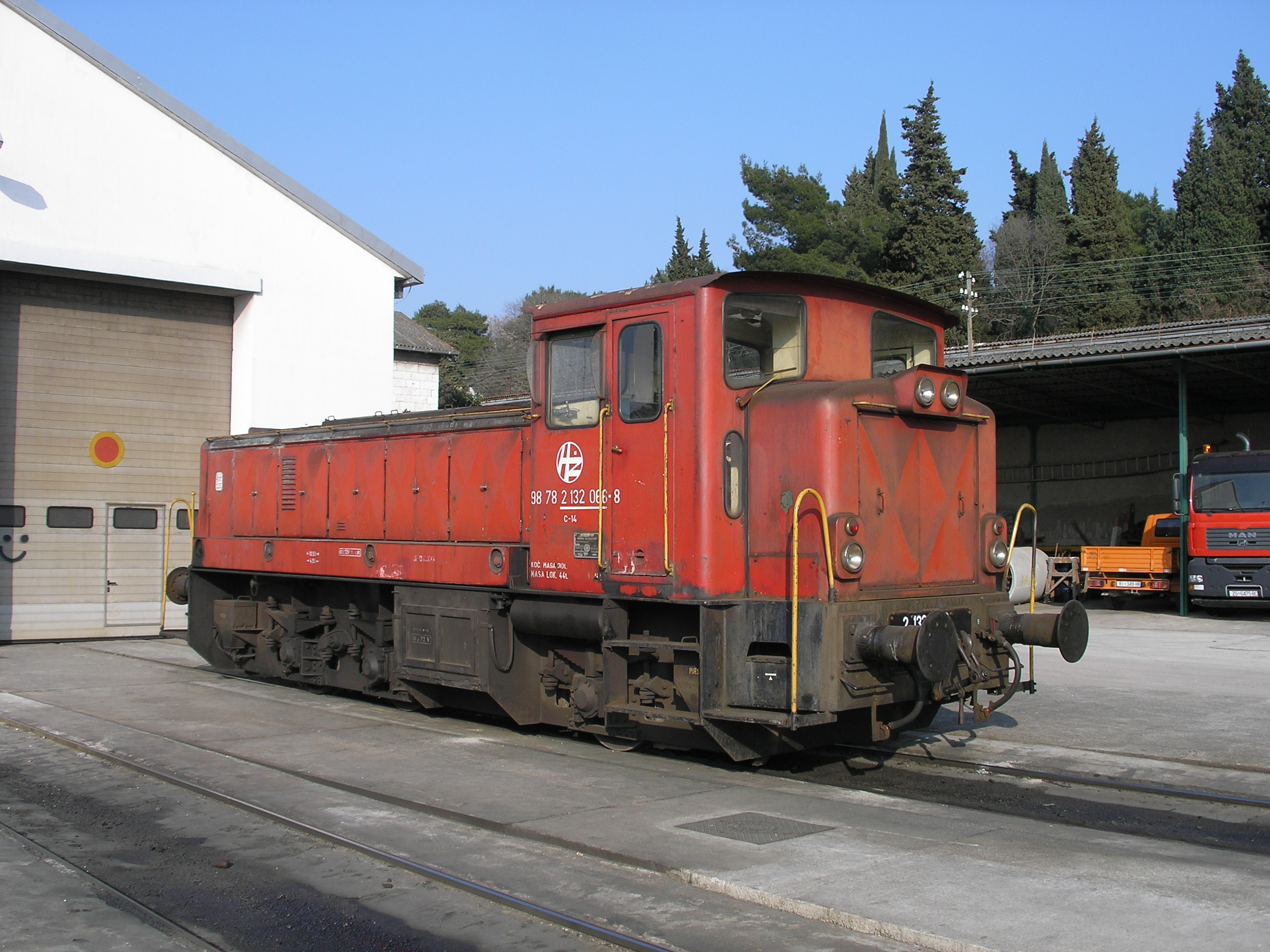
- Series 732
Type and origin
- Power type: Diesel-hydraulic
- Builder: Đuro Đaković
- Model: 44-ton switcher
- Build date: 1969-1977
Specifications
- Configuration
  - AAR: C
- Gauge: 1,435 mm (4 ft 8 1/2 in) standard gauge
- Loco weight: 44 short tons (39 long tons; 40 t)
- Prime mover: Pielstick or Jenbacher (?) JW 600 (441 kW or 591 hp)
- Engine type: 2-stroke diesel
- Cylinders: N/A
Performance figures
- Power output: 397 kW (532 hp)
Career
- Nicknames: 2132 has the nicknames "Pielstick", "Jembach" (Croatia)
- Locale: Yugoslavia, in today's Croatia

The Đuro Đaković Series 732 is a 44-ton diesel-hydraulic switcher model locomotive series.

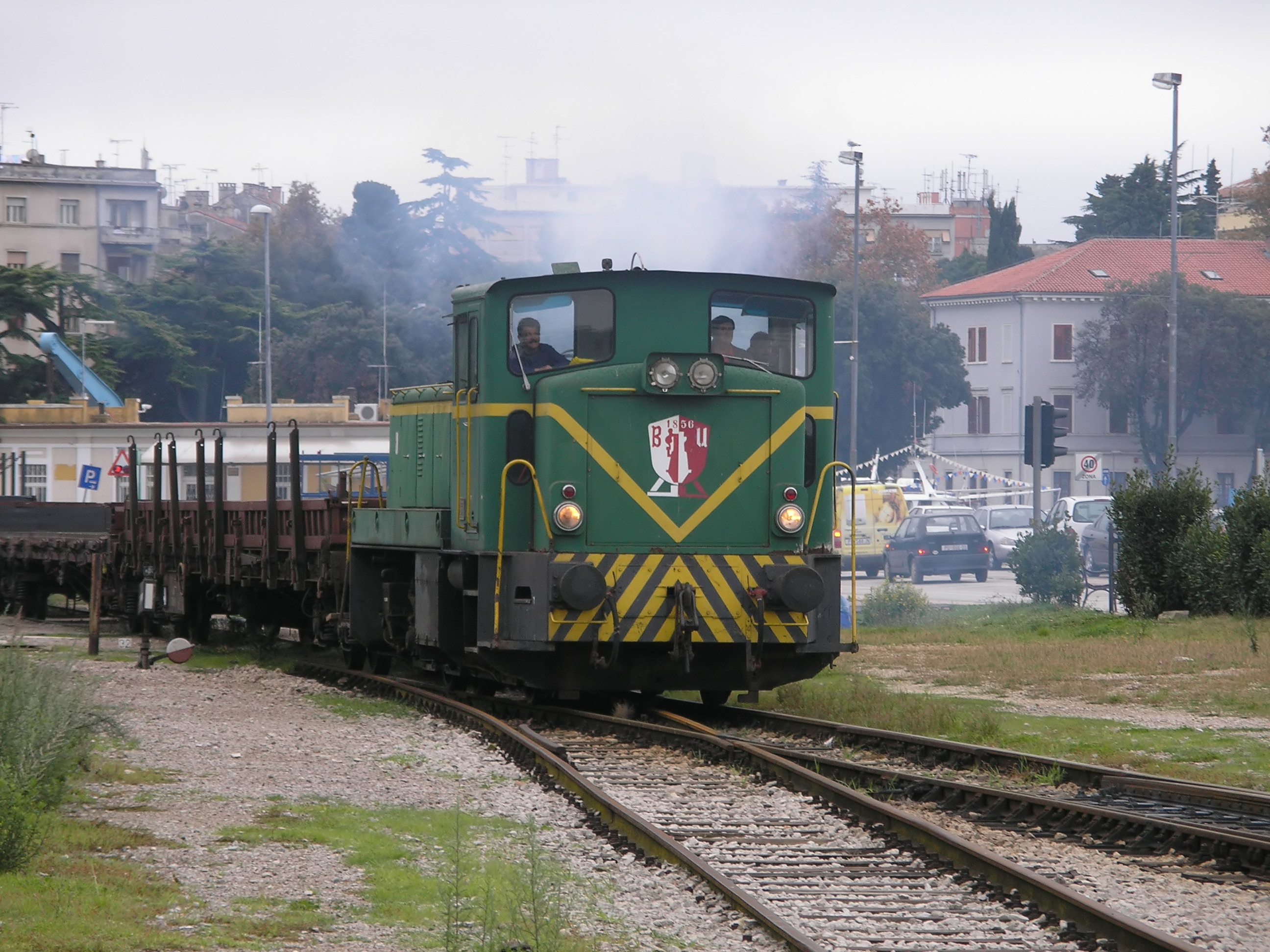
A similar unit being used by Uljanik
