= TCDD DE22000 =

Diesel-electric locomotive

DE 22000
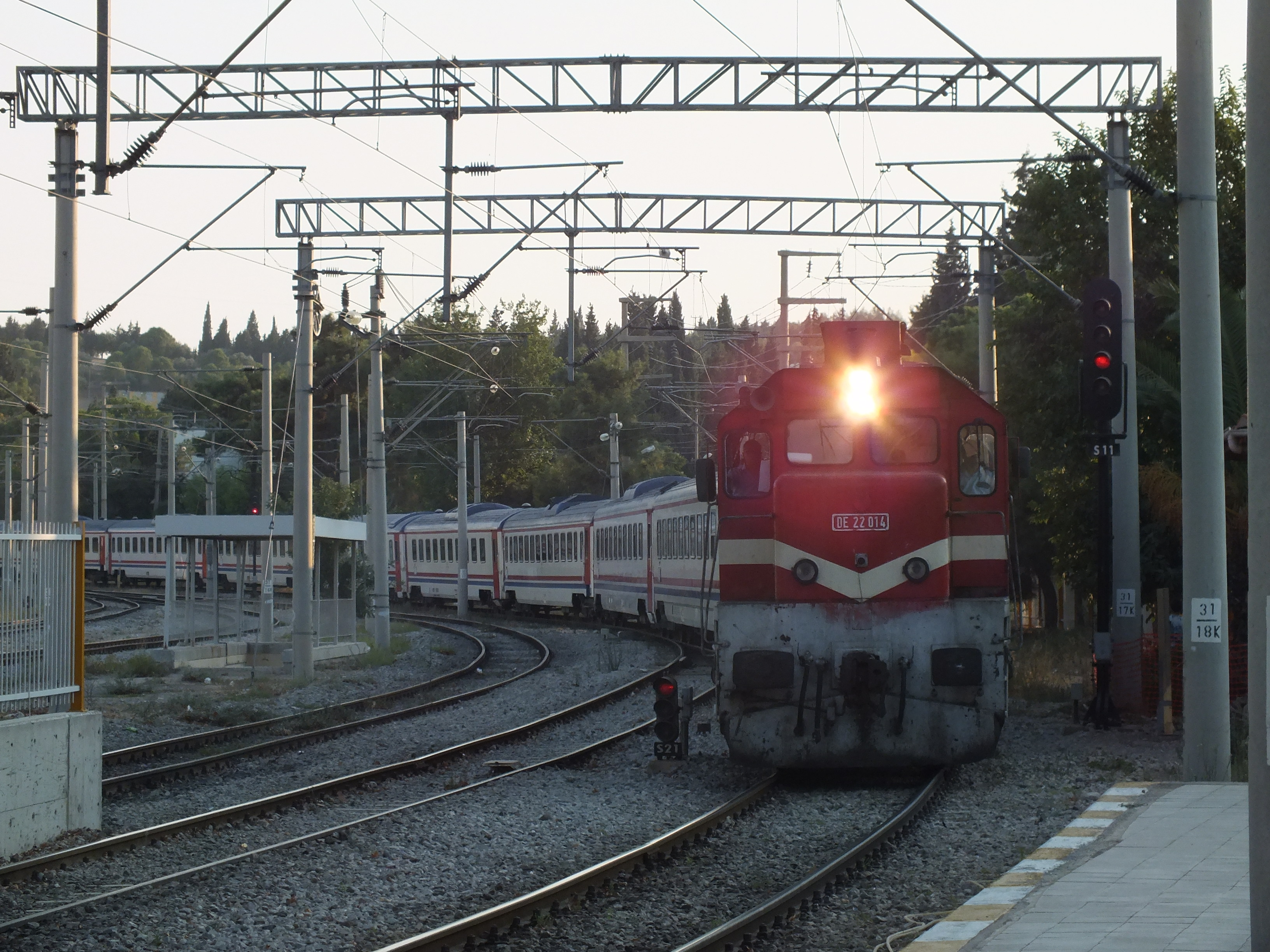
- DE22014 pulling the Karesi Express into Menemen.
Type and origin
- Power type: Diesel-electric
- Designer: Electro-Motive Division
- Builder: Tülomsaş
- Build date: 1985–1989
- Total produced: 86
Specifications
- Configuration
  - AAR: C-C
  - UIC: Co'Co'
- Gauge: 1,435 mm (4 ft 8 1/2 in)
- Wheel diameter: 1,016 mm (40.0 in)
- Length: 18,942 mm (62 ft 1.7 in)
- Loco weight: 118 tonnes (116 long tons; 130 short tons)
- Fuel capacity: 4,542 litres (1,000 imp gal; 1,200 US gal)
- Prime mover: EMD 16-645E
- Engine type: Two-stroke diesel
- Aspiration: Supercharged
- Transmission: AC-DC
Performance figures
- Maximum speed: 120 km/h (75 mph)
- Power output: 1,642 kW (2,200 hp)
- Tractive effort: 440 kN (99,000 lbf)
Career
- Operators: Turkish State Railways
- Numbers: DE22001 – DE22086

TCDD DE22000 are 86 mainline locomotives built for the Turkish State Railways by TÜLOMSAŞ under license by General Motors Electro-Motive Diesel, based on the EMD G26CW-2. The locomotives use GM's 16 cylinder, direct injection 16 645E engine, AR10/D18 AC alternator and a D77-DC traction motor.

The DE22000 are usually used for freight transport but are also used frequently for passenger transport. The locomotives main characteristic were that they were the first locomotive in Turkey to have multiple unit (MU) capabilities. This allowed 2 or more to be coupled and used for head-end power, however not all locomotives have this capability.
