= JŽ 664 locomotive =

JŽ 664
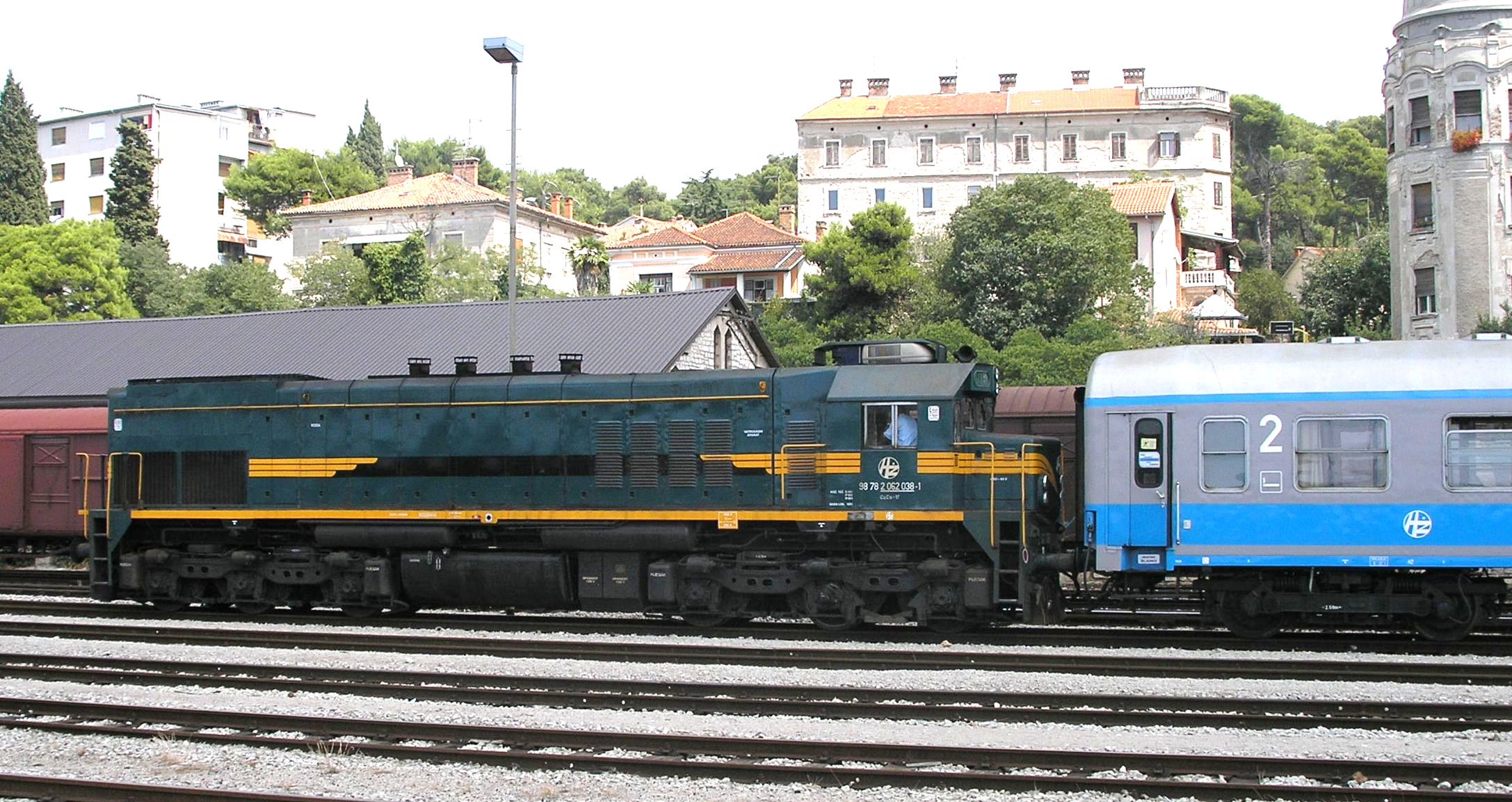
- 2062 038 locomotive (EMD G26) in Pula, Croatia
Type and origin
- Power type: Diesel-electric
- Builder: Đuro Đaković
- Model: EMD G26
- Build date: 1972-1984
- Total produced: 85
Specifications
- Configuration
  - AAR: C-C
  - UIC: Co-Co
- Gauge: 1,435 mm (4 ft 8 1/2 in) standard gauge
- Wheel diameter: 1,016 mm (40 in)
- Length: 16.94 m (55 ft 7 in)
- Loco weight: 103 t (227,076 lb); 103 t (114 short tons; 101 long tons)
- Fuel type: Diesel fuel
- Fuel capacity: 2,840 L (625 imp gal; 750 US gal)
- Prime mover: EMD 16-645E
- Engine type: V16 diesel
- Cylinders: 16
- Cylinder size: 9.0625 in × 10 in (230 mm × 254 mm)
Performance figures
- Maximum speed: 124 km/h (77 mph)
- Power output: 1,617 kW (2,168 hp)
- Tractive effort: 242.3 kN (54,471 lbf)
Career
- Operators: Yugoslav Railways
- Class: 664-0; 664-1
- Number in class: 65 (664-0); 20 (664-1)
- 664-0: 60 transferred to Croatia (HŽ series 2062), 5 to Serbia; 664-1: all to Slovenia (SŽ series 664)

The JŽ 664 locomotives were a class of diesel locomotives operated by Yugoslav Railways. They are a GM-EMD export model of type EMD G26, subclass 664-0 was built by EMD, subclass 664-1 was built by Đuro Đaković from 1972 until 1984.

After the breakup of Yugoslavia the locomotives were split. The 664-0 subclass were split between Croatia as HŽ series 2062 (60 units), and Serbia (5 units); the 664-1 subclass were transferred to the Slovenian Railways (as SŽ series 664), 20 units.

== See also ==
- Krajina Express, armoured train of Krajina Serbs utilised locomotive number JŽ 664 013 (now HŽ 2062 055) during the Croatian War of Independence.
