= Đuro Đaković (company) =

Metal engineering group based in Croatia

Coordinates: 45.16627°N 18.01188°E

Đuro Đaković Grupa d.d.
- Type: Public company
- Traded as: ZSE: DDJH
- Industry: Metal engineering
- Predecessor: Prva jugoslavenska tvornica vagona strojeva i mostova dd Brod na Savi (1921–1947); Đuro Đaković Industrija šinskih vozila, industrijskih i energetskih postrojenja i čeličnih konstrukcija Slavonski Brod (1947–1991)
- Founded: 1991; 35 years ago
- Founder: Aleksandar Ehrmann
- Headquarters: Slavonski Brod, Croatia
- Products: Boilers, railway vehicles, bridges, cranes, industrial structures, armoured vehicles
- Number of employees: ~3,000
- Website: duro-dakovic.com/en/

Đuro Đaković Grupa d.d. is a Croatian mechanical engineering company based in Slavonski Brod, Croatia. The company is named after Đuro Đaković, a prominent Yugoslav metal worker of the interwar period. Đuro Đaković is one of Croatia's largest defence contractors and manufacturers.

The company's origins date to the establishment of a metal engineering factory in Brod in 1921, it expanded throughout the 20th century, becoming a major regional enterprise of its type, active in rail vehicle manufacture including locomotives, industrial boilers, power plant construction, and large scale metal structures including bridges. In the 1990s the company was privatised and a number of businesses became separate entities – the remainder were grouped under the 'Đuro Đaković Holding d.d.' group.

== History ==
=== Background ===
In 1921, the company Prva jugoslavenska tvornica vagona strojeva i mostova dd Brod na Savi (First Yugoslavian wagon, machinery and bridge factory company, Brod on the Sava) was established, with 125000 shares of 400 crowns. The factory buildings were constructed by 1922. Croatian industrialist Aleksandar Ehrmann was leading in attracting foreign investment into the firm in 1923.

In 1926, the company constructed its first bridge (over the Tisza near Titel), and its first railway vehicle, and first steam boiler. In 1928 the company produced its first tram (for Belgrade). Development of the company continued in the 1930s with the factory beginning to produce vessels for the chemical industry, cranes, and powered railway vehicles.

During the Invasion of Yugoslavia of 1941 the factory was heavily damaged. Post World War II the factory employed 1330 people (1945). After reconstruction of the war damaged buildings, it was renamed Đuro Đaković Industrija šinskih vozila, industrijskih i energetskih postrojenja i čeličnih konstrukcija Slavonski Brod in 1947, after Brod born communist politician Đuro Đaković. In the 1950s the company entered into a collaboration with Babcock & Wilcox (1952), and manufactured its first diesel engine (1955). The company also manufactured railway vehicles for domestic use and for export.

The company workforce expanded from 2500 (1952) to over 4500 by 1964; by 1969 the factory had become a major boiler and steel structure manufacturer. During this period the plant began manufacturing GM-EMD locomotives under license. In the 1970s the company's interests were extended to nuclear power plant manufacturing—the company was involved in the construction of the Krško Nuclear Power Plant. Other large scale industrial construction projects included construction of Sugar and Cement factories, and an association with Belgian boiler manufacturer Wanson was formed. A company manufacturing industrial scale expansion joints was established in 1974 in association with Teddington Bellows (UK).

During the 1980s the company diversified into the production of agricultural machinery (in association with Deutz-Fahr), vending machines, seamless cylinders (e.g. gas cylinders), and began serial production of the M-84 tank in 1983. Involvement in construction of railway vehicles (including liquified gas wagons), factories, and power plants also continued. By 1986 the company employed over 16000 people.

=== Đuro Đaković Holding ===
In 1991, the company Đuro Đaković was formed by a shareholding investor who founded the Hrvatski fond za razvoj (Croatian Development Fund) and the Croatian Railways; in 1993, it became a dioničko društvo (joint stock company). During the Croatian War of Independence the company manufactured weapons for the Croatian army. In the post war period the company was involved in reconstruction projects, including the reconstruction of several steel river bridges.

The research, testing, and certification branch of the company was split in 1993 forming ĐURO ĐAKOVIĆ-Centar za istraživanje i razvoj d.o.o. (Duro Dakovic research and development centre). Several companies were divested from the group, including Đuro Đaković Kompenzatori d.o.o. (1995, expansion joints, formerly 'Đuro Đaković-Teddington'), and Đuro Đaković-Termoenergetska Postrojenja d.o.o. (1997, boiler fabrication and commissioning), Đuro Đaković – Zavarene posude d.d. (1996, welded containers, primarily for liquefied gas). The steam boiler manufacturing plant became an independent company as Kotlovi d.o.o. in 2002, it was renamed Đuro Đaković Kotlovi d.o.o. in 2004.

The construction subsidiary Đuro Đaković Montaža d.d., separate company since 1996, manufacturer and installer of power, petrochemical, and other industrial plants, steel bridges (since 2004), and oil platforms (since 2003), became a subsidiary of Bilfinger Berger in the Bilfinger Berger Power Services division in 2009.

In 2005, the company was re-capitalised by the Croatian state (122 million Kr), giving a total capitalisation of over 640 million Kr. To balance losses accrued, the company's shares were devalued (200Kr to 100Kr).

In 2022, Czech company DD Acquisition became the majority shareholder of Đuro Đaković as part of a restructuring of the group. DD Acquisition was established by CE Industries and Promet Group, which held 65% and 35% of the investment company, respectively. Following the recapitalisation, DD Acquisition acquired approximately 82% of Đuro Đaković.

== Group structure and operations ==
The parent company, Đuro Đaković Grupa d.d., is listed on the Zagreb Stock Exchange. As of 31 December 2025, DD Acquisition held approximately 81.9% of its share capital, while the Republic of Croatia held approximately 17.9%.

As of 2026, the group is composed of seven subsidiaries:

Đuro Đaković Specijalna vozila d.d.

Đuro Đaković Specijalna vozila ĐĐ Specijalna vozila manufacturers armoured vehicles, including the M-84D tank, and the Patria AMV 8x8 (under contract from Patria, Finland), as well as mine clearing vehicles. The company's other main activity is the manufacture of rail freight wagons; as of 2012 the product range includes side tipping, bottom discharge, covered including curtain wall and sliding door, ISO container carrying, and tank wagons for bulk powders.

Đuro Đaković Elektromont d.d.

ĐĐ Elektromont provides electrical and other engineering services and products for industrial and public utility use. Products and services include electric process control equipment and power supply design and installation, traffic signals and related equipment, crane overhaul, light metal forming and assembly, and powder coating. Since the beginning of the 21st century, the company began to provide civil engineering services for housing, factory, and business construction projects.

Đuro Đaković Inženjering d.d.

ĐĐ Inženjering undertakes design and management of large scale metal structure construction, including structures for power plants, the petrochemical industry (including spherical and cylindrical storage tanks, reactor vessels, columns etc.), other industrial plants (cement, food industry, etc.); bridges and cranes.

Đuro Đaković Proizvodnja opreme d.o.o.

ĐĐ Proizvodnja opreme manufactures large scale metal structures for power and industrial plants, including rotary kiln and mill structures for the cement industry and pressure vessels including columns, heat exchangers, and reactors.

Đuro Đaković Strojna obrada d.o.o.

ĐĐ Strojna obrada manufactures rail vehicle wheelsets; locomotive frames; mechanical transmission components for locomotives, agricultural machinery, and other industries; oil well equipment (valves, well heads, pump units); and slewing rings for tanks and windmills.

Đuro Đaković Energetika i infrastruktura d.o.o.

ĐĐ Energetika i infrastruktura is an energy utility provided servicing the industrial complex of Đuro Đaković; it provides compressed air, natural gas, water, waste, telephone, heat and electricity.

Slobodna zona Đuro Đaković Slavonski Brod d.o.o.

The Slobodna zona Đuro Đaković Slavonski Brod (Freezone Đuro Đaković Slavonski Brod) is an area of the Đuro Đaković industrial zone in Slavonski Brod assigned to encourage new business developments – the area has reduced customs, tax, and rates.

== Notable products ==
=== Rolling stock ===
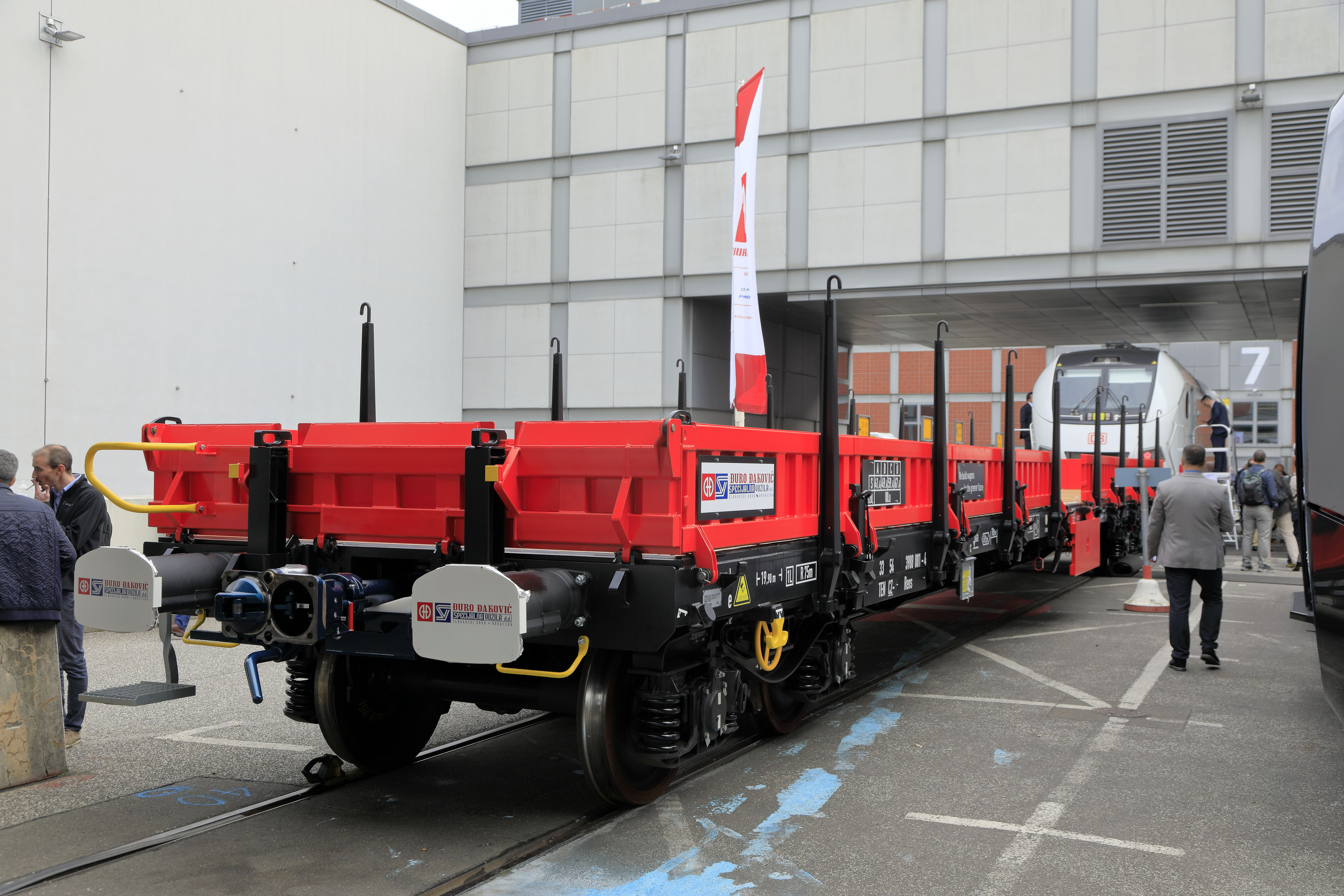
Railway transport wagons produced by Đuro Đaković

Đuro Đaković manufactured many of the diesel locomotives used by the Yugoslav Railways. In the post World War II period these included over 150 units of JZ 642 and JZ 643 Bo'Bo' locomotives built in collaboration with Brissonneau and Lotz between 1961 and 1977, and the JZ 664 Co'Co locomotives built under license from GM-EMD (EMD G26 type) from 1972 onwards (84 units). The company also built diesel hydraulic shunters (JZ 732 and JZ 733) (165 total) from the late 1960s onwards, as well as license built passenger railcars.

In November 2023, the Djuro Djakovic Special Vehicle unit has signed an agreement with Swiss company to manufacture Tagnpps 95 freight rail carriages worth 23.8 million euro ($26 million).

Other rail vehicles manufactured included the Zagreb Tramway types TMK 101 and TMK 201.

=== Military vehicles ===
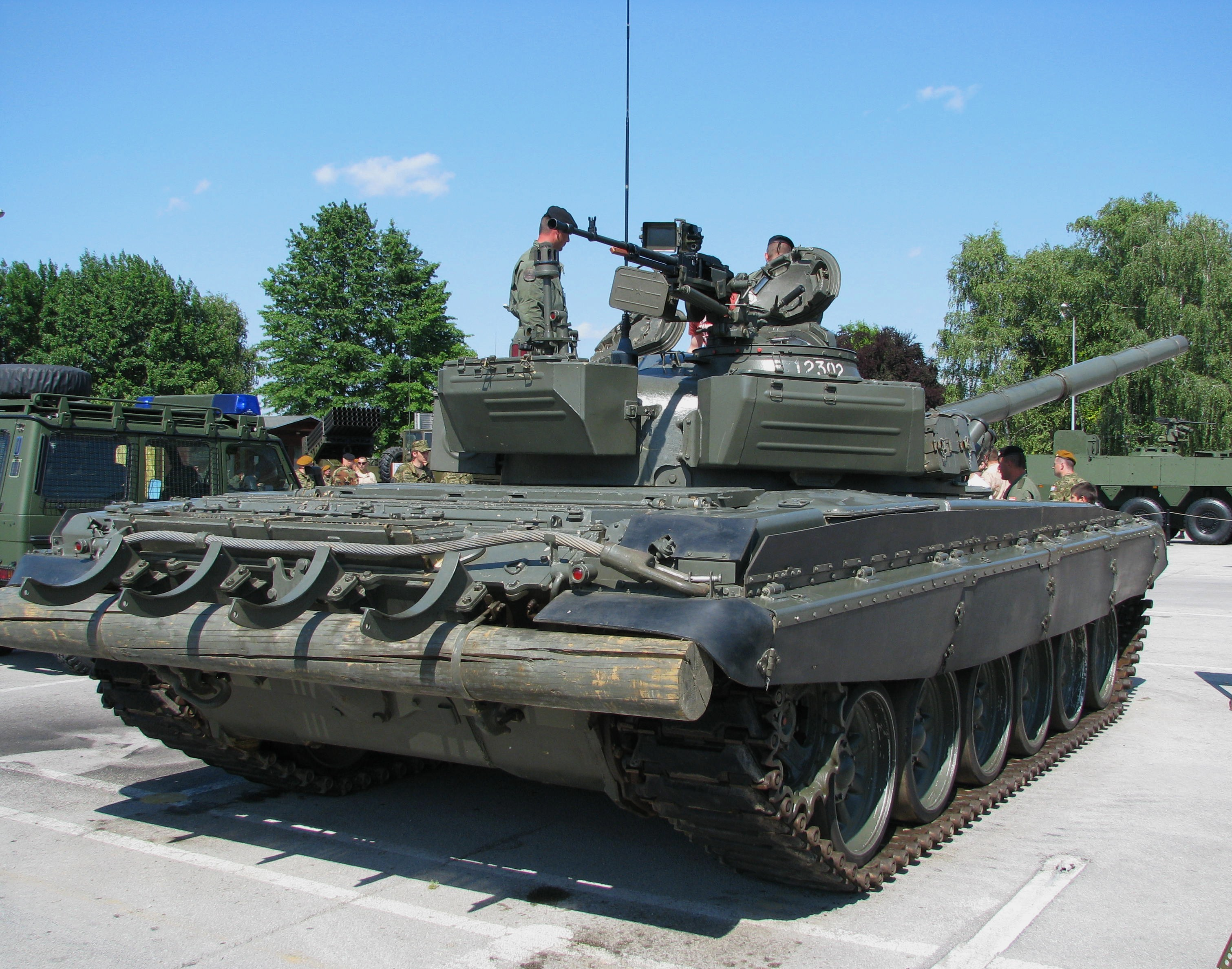
M-84A4 Snajper tank produced at ĐĐ between 1983 until 1991

The M-84 tank was created in the 1980s as a local version of the Russian T-72. During the Croatian war of independence the company produced the LOV-1; the first indigenous APC. The M-95 Degman is a prototype Croatian Main Battle Tank developed from the M-84 based on experimental M-91 Vihor. The company also modernizes T-72 tanks, and manufactures rocket launcher and mine sweeping machines.

In 2023, the Bradley Fighting Vehicles for Croatian army are being transported to the Djuro Djaković Special Vehicles (DDSV) facility where they will be fully refurbished. The extensive refurbishment process will consist of an overhaul of the vehicles’ drive train, installation of new weapons systems and armament, painting, and inspection to ensure the vehicles all meet the highest standards of performance.

In early 2024, up to 149 M-84AB tanks were sent to the Djuro Djakovic factory from Kuwait for refurbishment and repairs with the wide belief among military analysts they will be then sent to Ukraine.
