= HŽ series 2062 =

Class of Yugoslav, later Croatian, diesel locomotives

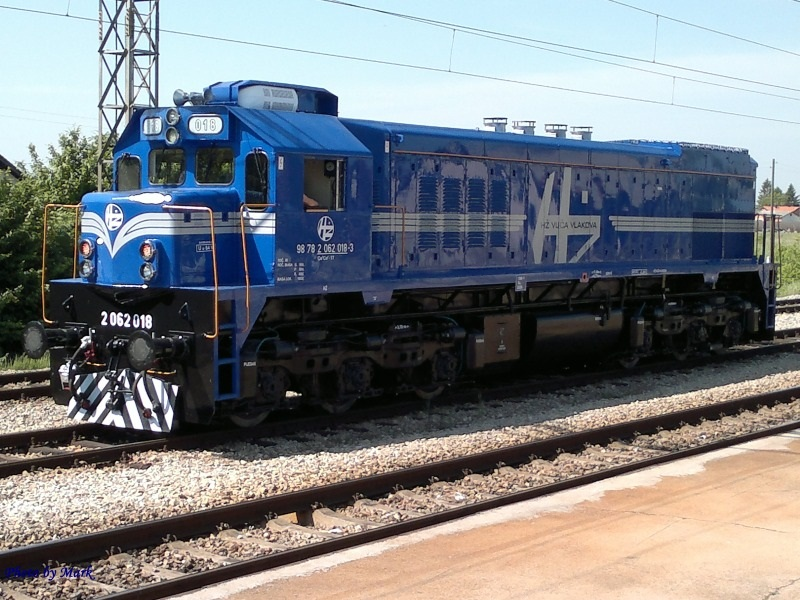
- 2062 018 in HZ's "large logo" livery
Type and origin
- Power type: Diesel-electric
- Builder: General Motors Diesel (GMD)
- Model: EMD G26
- Build date: 1972
- Total produced: 64 built for JŽ (56 in HŽ)
Specifications
- Configuration
  - UIC: Co-Co
- Gauge: 1,435 mm (4 ft 8 1/2 in) standard gauge
- Wheel diameter: 1,016 mm (40 in)
- Length: 16.94 m (55 ft 7 in)
- Loco weight: 103 tonnes (101 long tons; 114 short tons)
- Fuel type: Diesel fuel
- Prime mover: EMD 16-645E
Performance figures
- Maximum speed: 124 km/h (77 mph)
- Power output: 1,640 kW (2,200 hp)
Career
- Operators: JŽ » HŽ
- Class: JŽ: 664-0, HŽ: 2062
- Number in class: 21 left 09/2007
- Nicknames: "Ličanka" , "James", ("Turner" 100 subseries, if double traction used)
- Disposition: In service

The HŽ Series 2062 is a class of diesel-electric locomotives belonging to Croatian Railways (Croatian: hrvatske željeznice, HŽ). They are examples of the EMD G26 locomotive series.

Prior to the breakup of Yugoslavia, when in use with JŽ these locos were classified as JŽ 664-0. Of the original 64 JŽ locomotives, 56 found their way to HŽ, with the remainder in use with ŽS.

HŽ have modernised 20 class 2062s, reclassifying them as 2062-1s. The work was carried out by Gredelj & Turner.

The main usage for 2062s is in Lika, Dalmatia, Istria with a few in Slavonia. The -1 subclass is used only on Lika-Dalmatia services.

In 2018 three were acquired from HŽ Cargo by National Railway Equipment and refurbished by TŽV Gredelj for lease to Rail Cargo Carrier Croatia. Cabs were modified and train heating equipment was removed, as they would only be used on freight trains.
