= EMD G26 =

American locomotive

EMD G26 Series
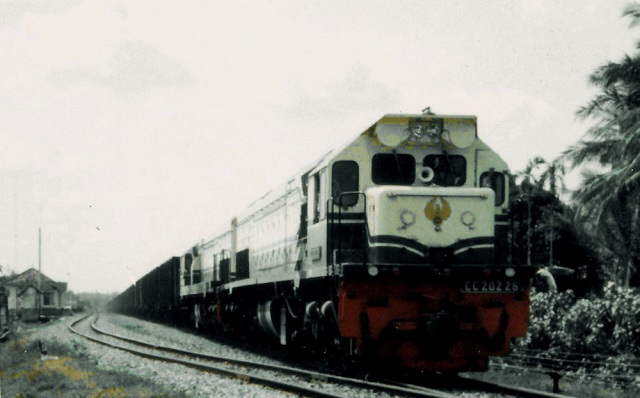
- Double Traction Indonesian Railways series CC202 pulling long-consist coal freight train from Tanjung Enim to Tarahan in 1990.
Type and origin
- Power type: Diesel–electric
- Builder: General Motors Electro-Motive Division (USA), General Motors Diesel (GMD), Canada; Clyde Engineering, Australia
- Model: G26
- Build date: 1969-2008
- Total produced: 345
Specifications
- Configuration
  - AAR: C-C
  - UIC: Co'Co'
- Gauge: 1,435 mm (4 ft 8 1/2 in): South Korea, Hong Kong; 1,067 mm (3 ft 6 in): Indonesia, Tasmania, Queensland; 1,000 mm (3 ft 3 3/8 in): Brazil, Chile
- Length: 16.94 m (55.6 ft)
- Loco weight: 98.8 long tons (100.4 t; 110.7 short tons); 106 long tons (108 t; 119 short tons)
- Fuel capacity: 2,840 litres (750 US gal; 620 imp gal)
- Prime mover: EMD 16-645E
- Cylinders: V16
- Cylinder size: 9.0625 in × 10 in (230 mm × 254 mm)
Performance figures
- Maximum speed: 124 km/h (77 mph) 80 km/h (50 mph) for G26MC-2U
- Power output: 2,000 bhp (1,490 kW) net 2,200 bhp (1,640 kW) gross
- Tractive effort: 24,710 kg_{f} (242.3 kN)
Career
- Nicknames: "James", "Sumatran Rhino" (Indonesia), "Regan" (Yugoslavia/successor states)

The G26 is a diesel–electric locomotive built in the US by General Motors Electro-Motive Diesel for export and in Australia by Clyde Engineering under licence. The G26 was developed to increase traction capacities on the tracks which supported lesser axle loadings. They were intended for main line freight and passenger traffic.

Rail companies using the G26 locomotives in the past or present include Australian Railroad Group, Freight Australia, Croatian Railways, Slovenian Railways, Serbian Railways, PT Kereta Api in Indonesia, Islamic Republic of Iran Railways, Israel Railways, Korail, ONCF in Morocco, MTR Corporation, and others.

== Australia ==
The Victorian Railways purchased 18 G26C locomotives built in Australia by Clyde Engineering, called the X class. They are now operated by Pacific National and SCT Logistics.

Queensland Rail purchased 102 GL26C-2 locomotives in 1970, locally built by Comeng as sub-contractor for Clyde Engineering, and known as the 2100 class. Ten of the 2100 class have since been sold to FCAB, Chile.

TasRail in Tasmania, operates four GL26C locomotives formerly of Queensland Rail. Known as the 2050 class. And two G26C locomotives known as the D class which are due to be retired late in 2014.

== Former Yugoslavia ==
The JŽ 664 locomotives were originally acquired by the Yugoslav Railways; after the breakup of Yugoslavia, the class were split between Serbia, Croatia, and Slovenia.

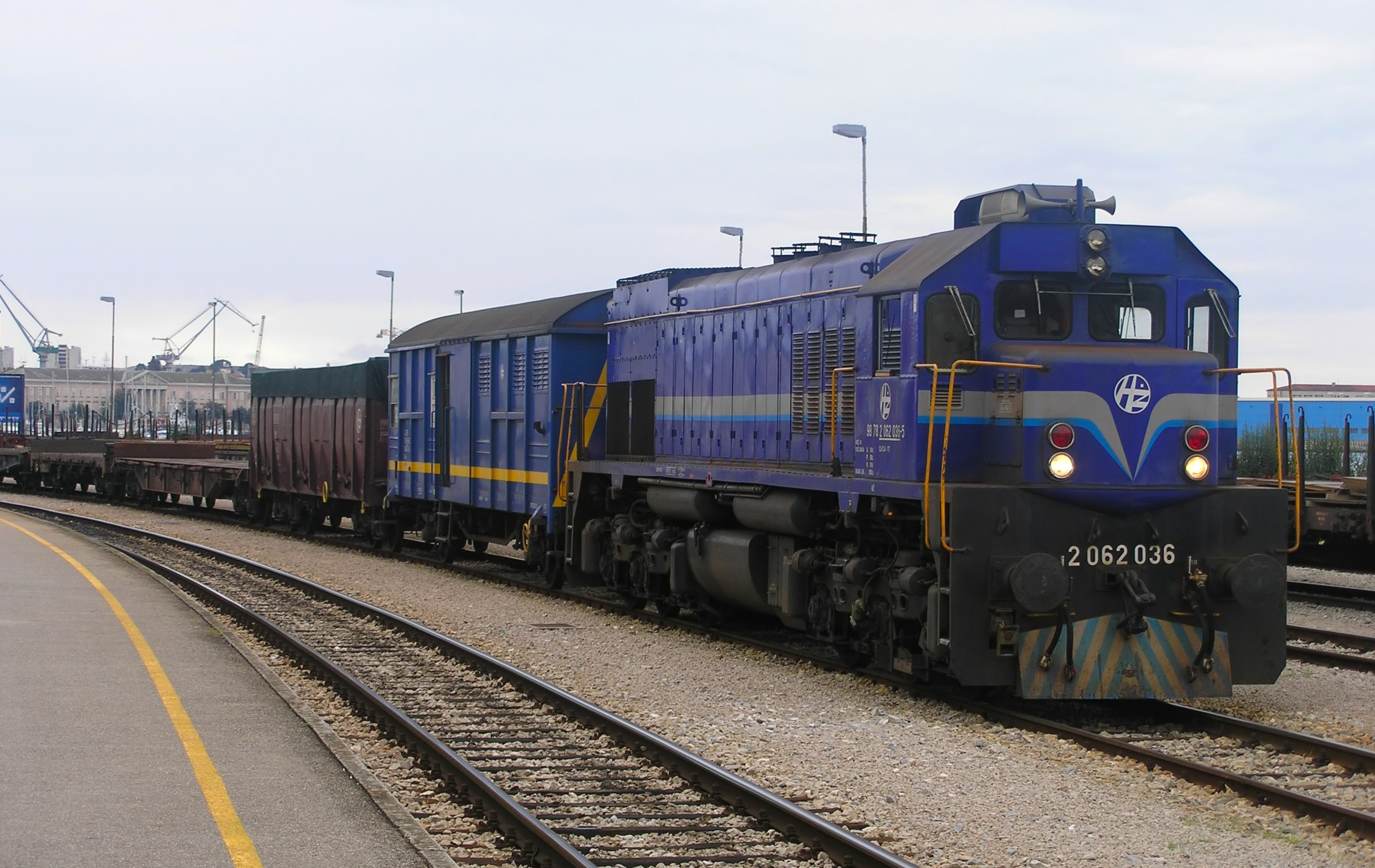
JŽ 664 locomotive or HŽ series 2062 pulling freight train in Pula Station, Croatia

== Brazil ==
Series 4500

36 G26CUs were built by EMD in Illinois for Rede Ferroviária Federal (Brazilian Federal Network) to operate on metre gauge lines in southern Brazil (1,000 mm (3 ft 3+3/8 in)). They have flexi-coil trucks. Upon privatization in 1997, the 30 units still in operation were transferred to ALL- América Latina Logística (Latin America Logistic). In the 2000s, 10 of these units were converted to G26CU-MP, with improvements in the traction system and fuel economy, while others were transformed into SLUG M2 units. Today, most of them have been retired, and all M2 units have been decommissioned.

== Hong Kong ==
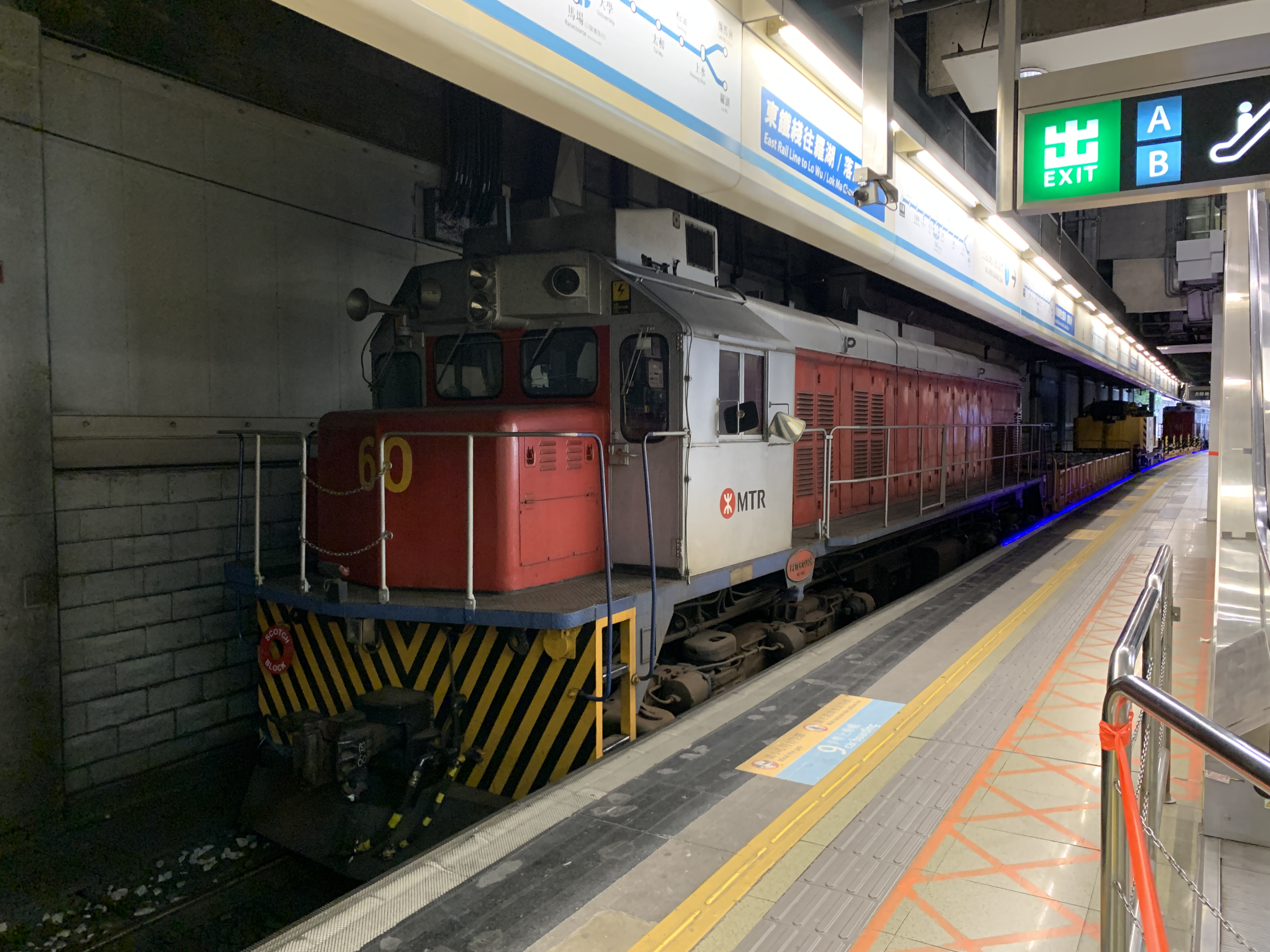
MTR locomotive EMD G26 in Hung Hom Station

Kowloon-Canton Railway purchased three G26 CU locomotives (60–62) in 1973. These were leased to MTR Corporation in 2007 due to the merger of the two railway networks. No.60 was named Peter Quick, after the CEO of KCRC in the 1980s. All were retired as of 2021; No. 60 was moved to the Hong Kong Railway Museum for exhibition in October 2023.

== Tunisia ==
5 G26CU 1972 060DH221 to 060DH225 SNCFT

== Egypt ==
33 G26CW 1973-1976 Egyptian Rys 3412-3429 18 3430-3444 15

== Israel ==
15 G26CW 1971-1978 Israeli Rys 601 to Israeli Rys 615

== Turkey ==
86 G26CW-2 purchased by the Turkish Railways TCDD in 1989. These locos received road numbers DE22001 to DE22086.

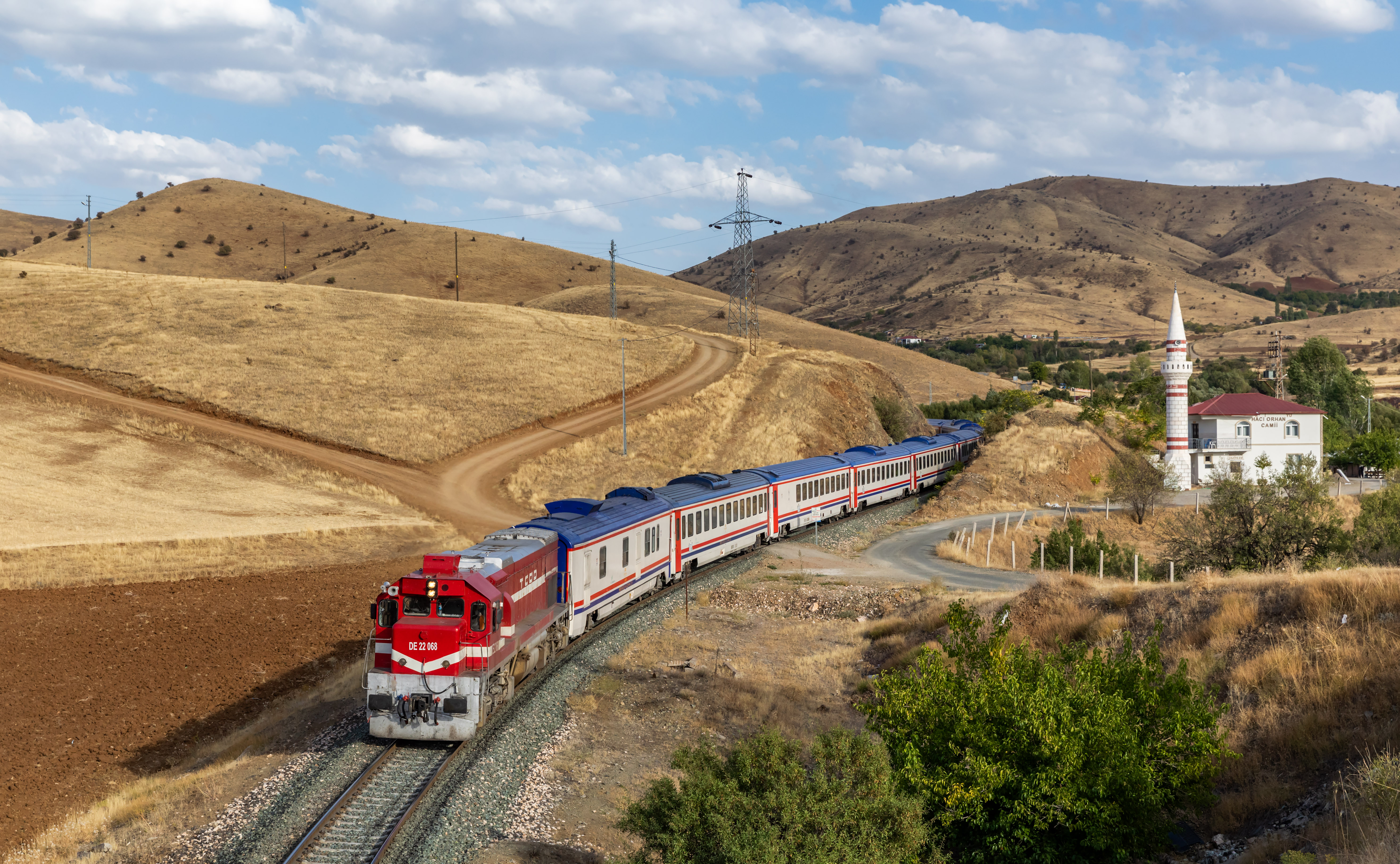
TCDD DE 22068 Kurk - Uluova

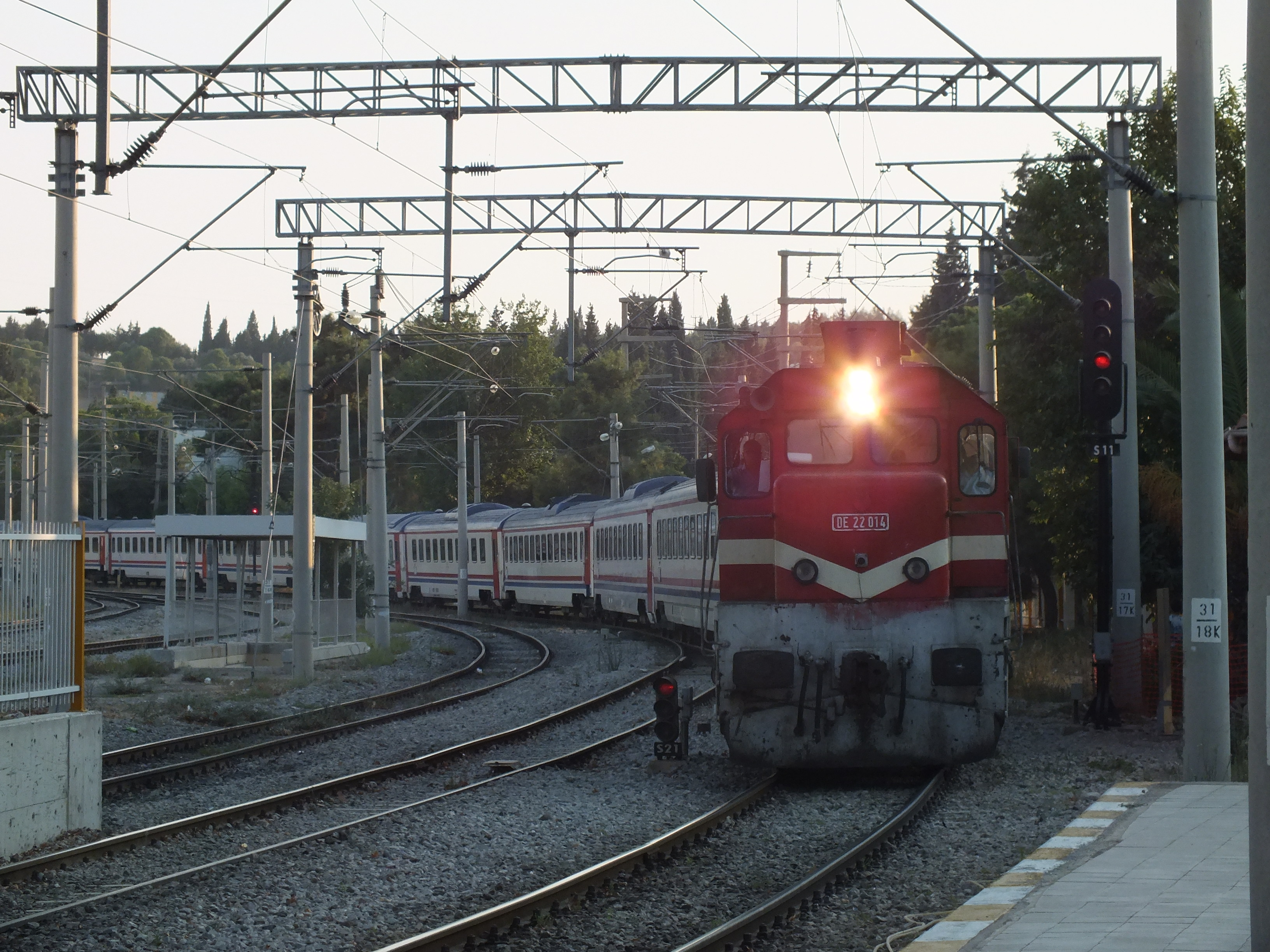
TCDD DE22000 pulling Ankara Karesi Express enter Menemen Station

== South Korea ==
Korean National Railroad purchased 10 G26CW locomotives in 1969, numbered 6301–6310.

== Indonesia ==
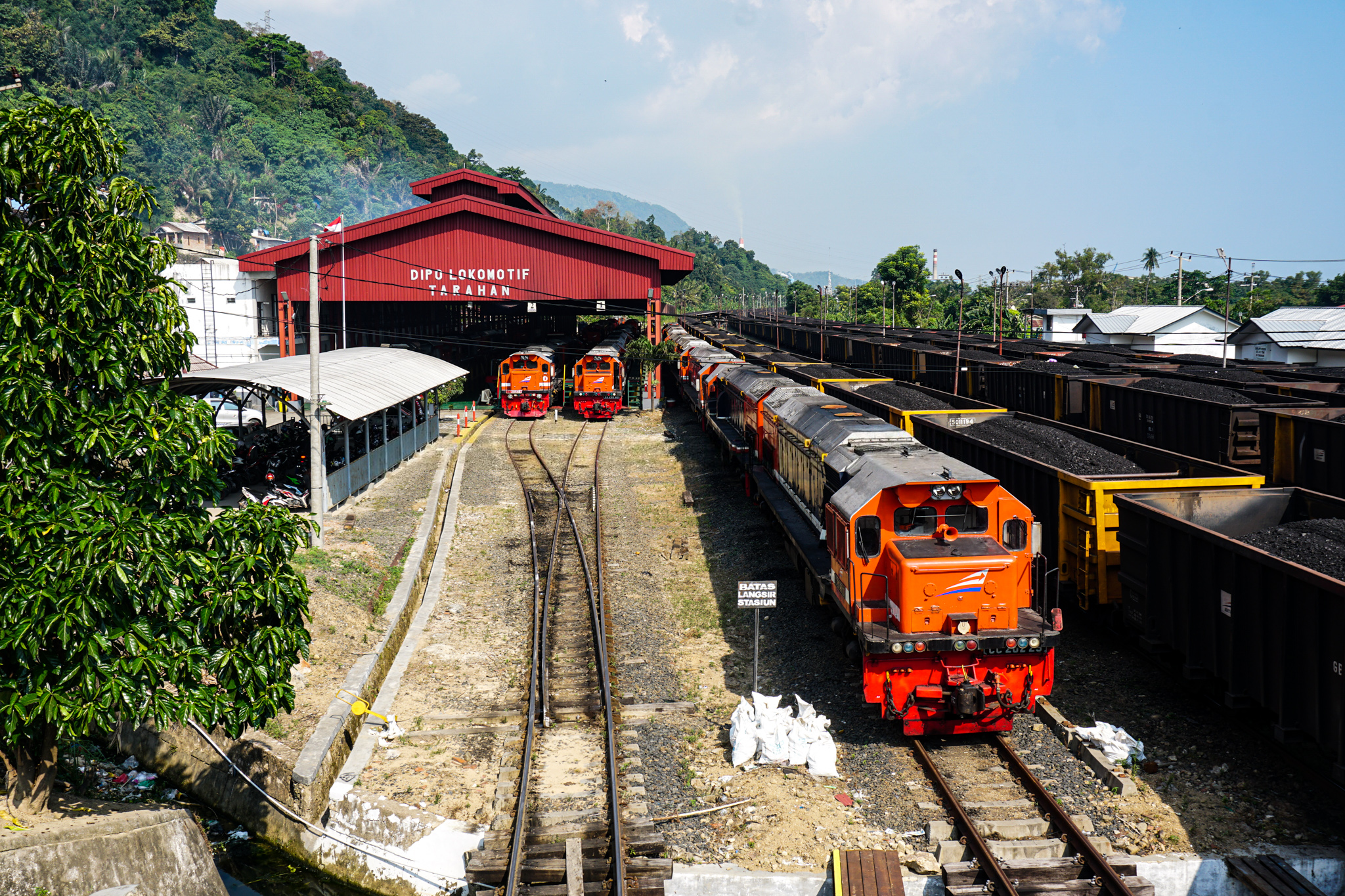
Several EMD G26MC-2Us at Tarahan Loco Shed are awaiting deployment the long-consist coal freight train service

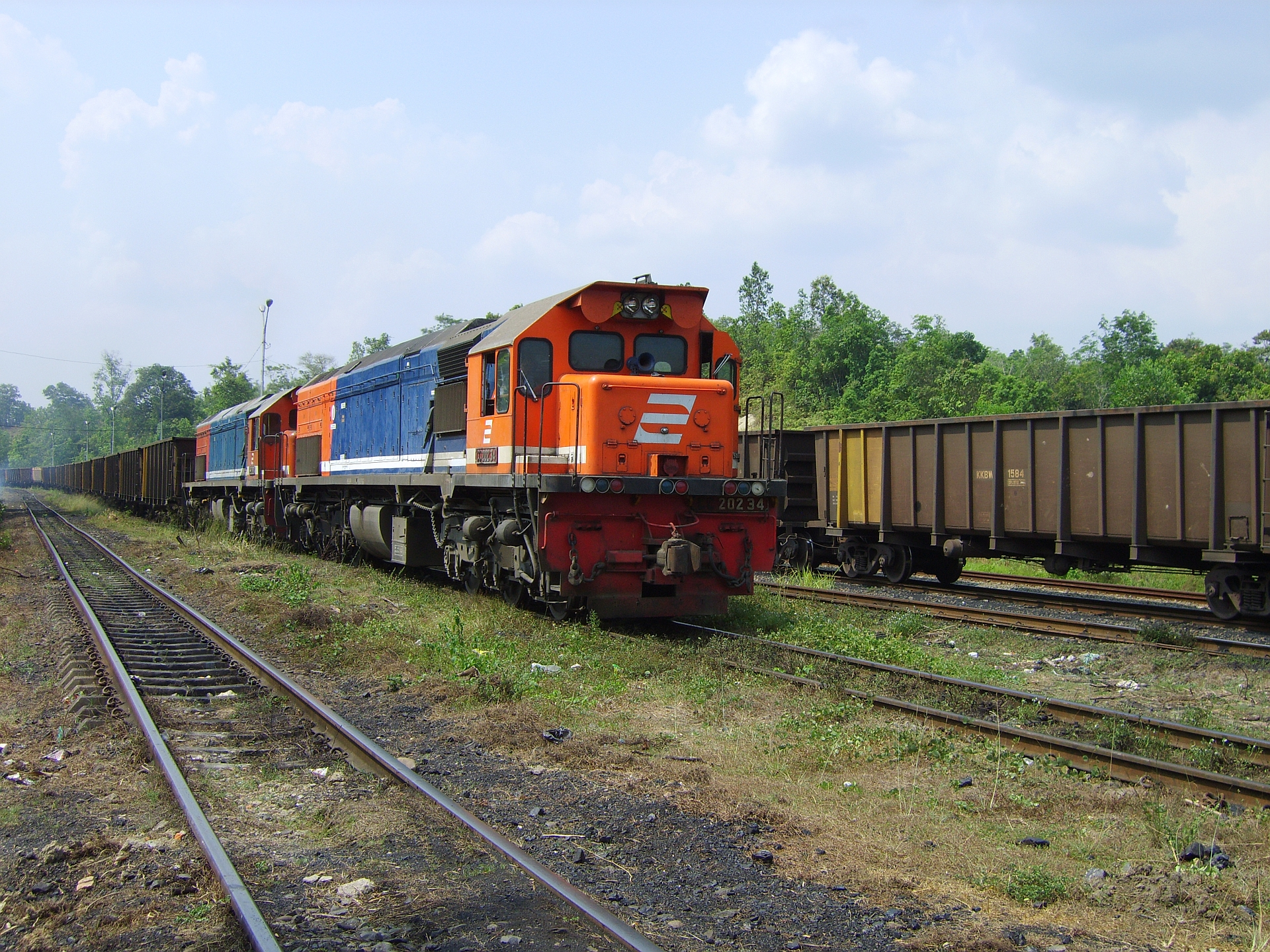
Long-consist coal freight train hauled by Double Traction EMD G26MC-2U or CC202 Locomotive

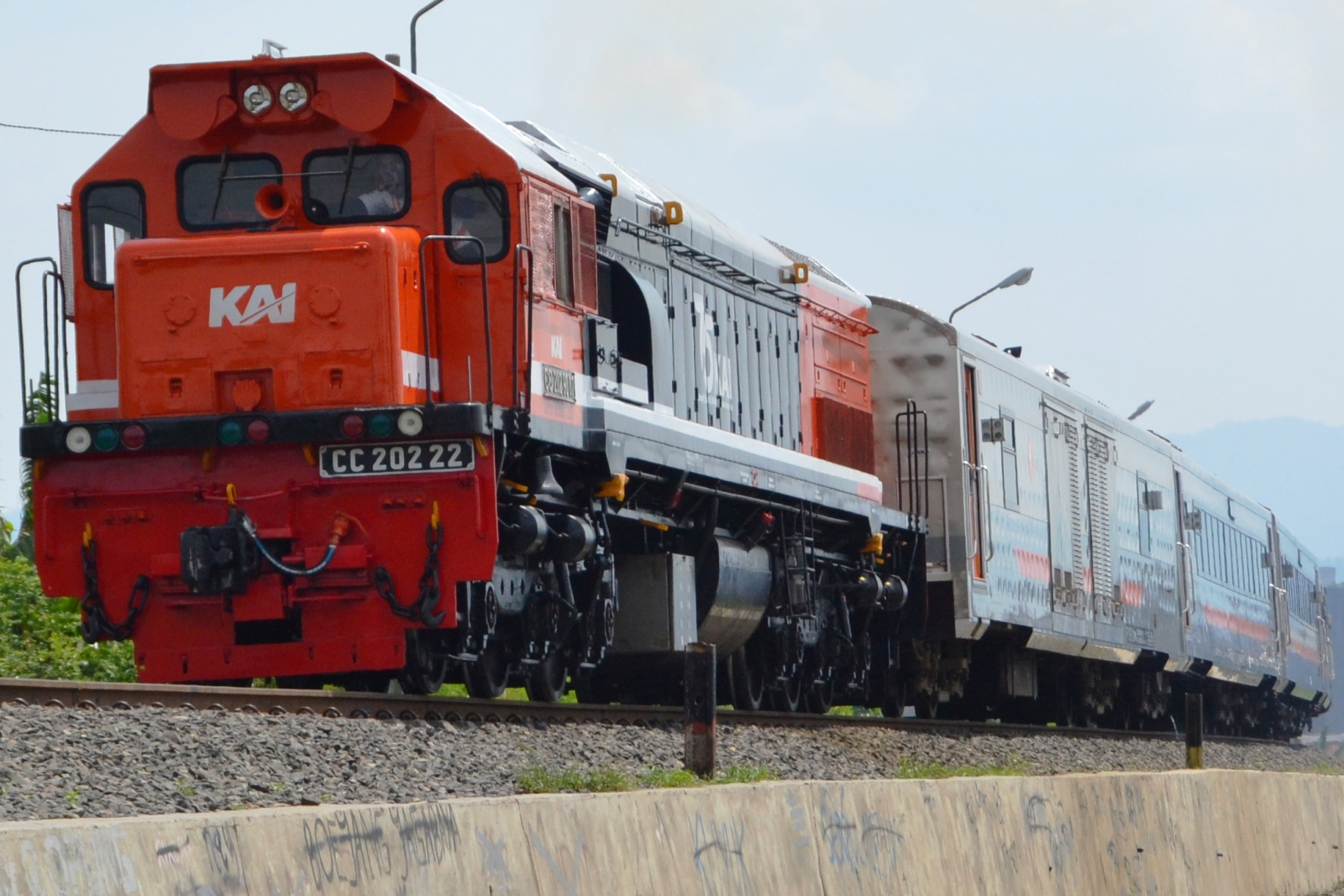
Special train for military hauled by EMD G26MC-2U

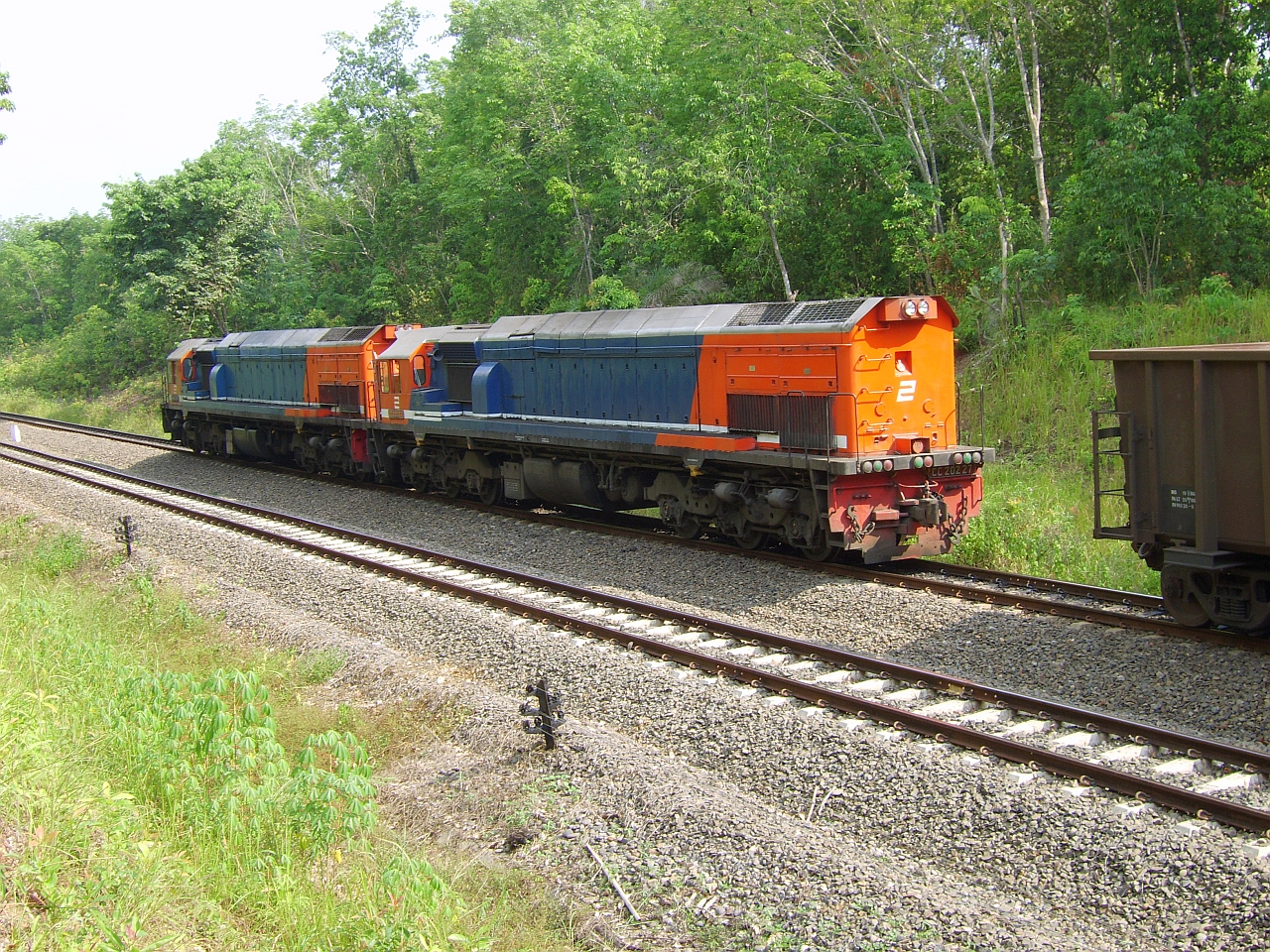
Double heading of CC202s, hauling long-consist coal train (Babaranjang Train).

The Indonesian State Railways purchased 15 G26MC-2U locomotives in 1986, classified as CC202 and numbered from 01 - 15. Later orders arrived in 1990 (15 locomotives, CC202 16 - 30), 1995 (3 locomotives, CC202 31 - 33), 2001 (4 locomotives, CC202 34 - 37), 2002 (2 locomotives, CC202 38 and 39) and finally in 2008 (9 locomotives, CC202 40 - 48).

The locomotives have an axle loading of 18 tons, and were originally used for bulk coal traffic between Tanjungenim (South Sumatra) and Tarahan (Lampung) pulling 50-60 coal gondolas in multiple operation. They have since been supplanted by the more modern CC205.

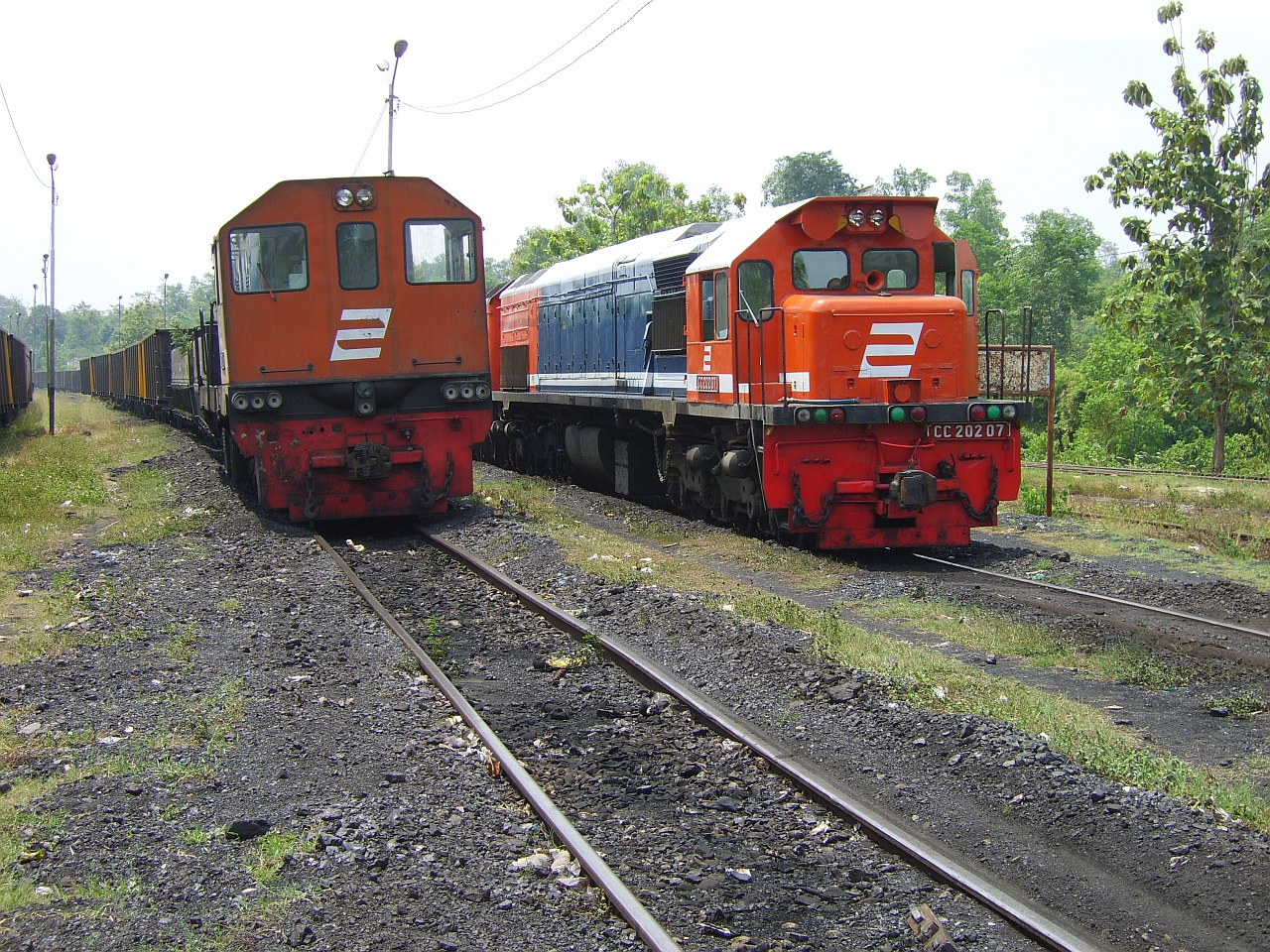
EMD G26MC-2U on the right side of EMD G18 at Tanjung Enim Railway Station

Beginning in 2010 a new numbering system was introduced, inserting two final digits of the date of manufacture of the locomotive. The individual numbers are restarted for each batch, Hence the first batch (CC202 01 - 15) becomes CC202 86 01 - 86 15, and the second batch (CC202 16 - 30) becoming CC202 90 01 - 90 15. For some weird reason, CC202 31 - 33 become CC202 93 01 - CC202 93 03, despite being built in 1995.

Except for CC202 90 01 (former CC 202 16), which was scrapped after a major accident in 2012, all the locomotives remain in operation.

All of the CC202 Locomotives in operation have distinctive 1990s Perumka livery, but with 2020 version of PT KAI logo. However

, CC202 90 02 (former CC202 17) and CC202 08 07 (former CC202 46) have PJKA livery from 1980s. Interestingly, CC202 08 07 was the final batch of CC202 to arrive and never painted with PJKA paint scheme. Formerly, CC202 86 09 (former CC 202 09) also painted with PJKA paint scheme, but in 2023 it was repainted with Perumka red and blue paint scheme.

This is similar to some CC201 on Java (CC201 77 17 (already scrapped), 83 31, 83 34 and 92 01 (still on-going repairs)). As of 2019, all of the locomotives are based in the Tarahan depot (Lampung).

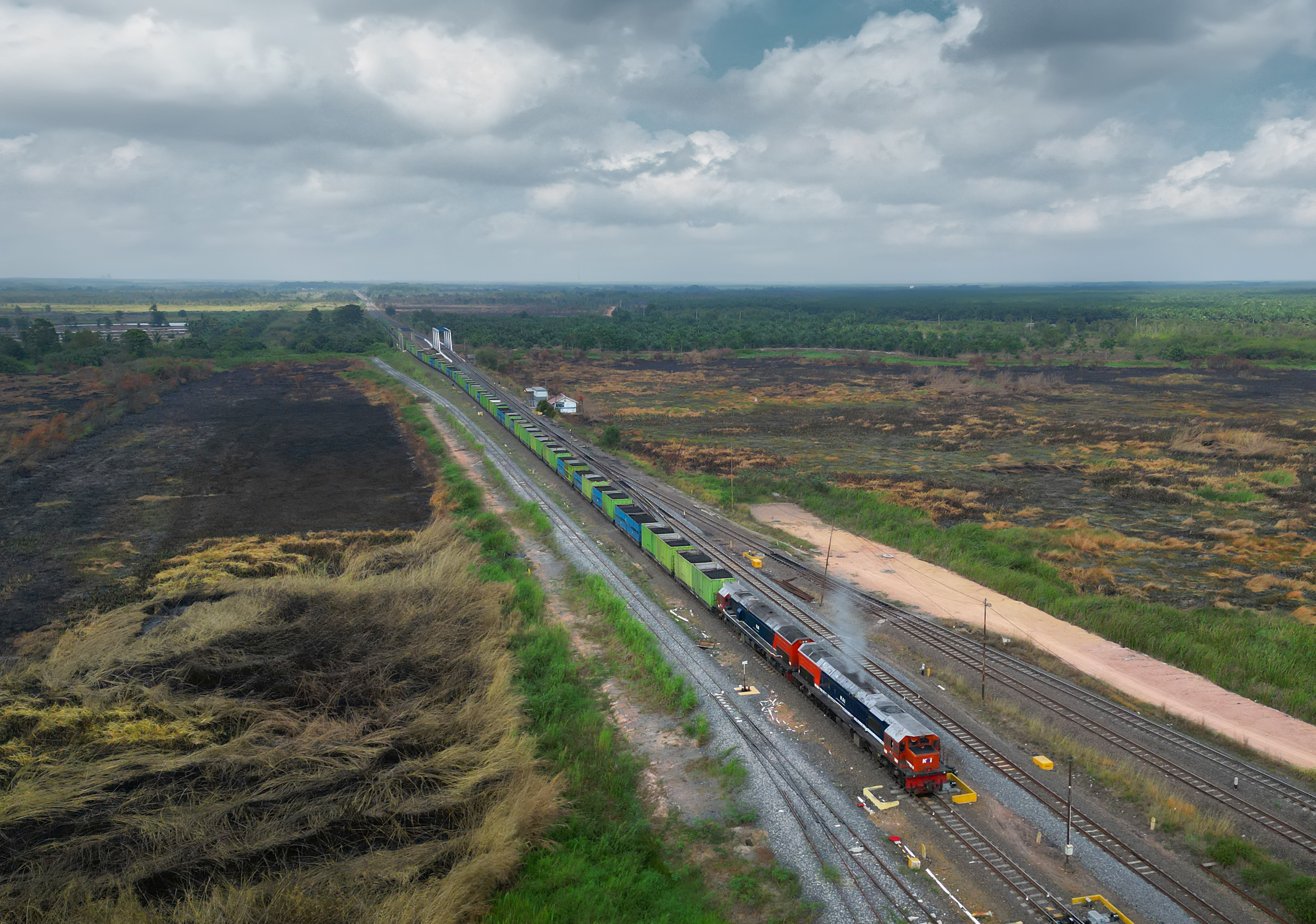
Double Traction EMD G26MC-2U pulling private long-haul coal freight train from Sukacinta to Kertapati, Palembang

== Gallery ==
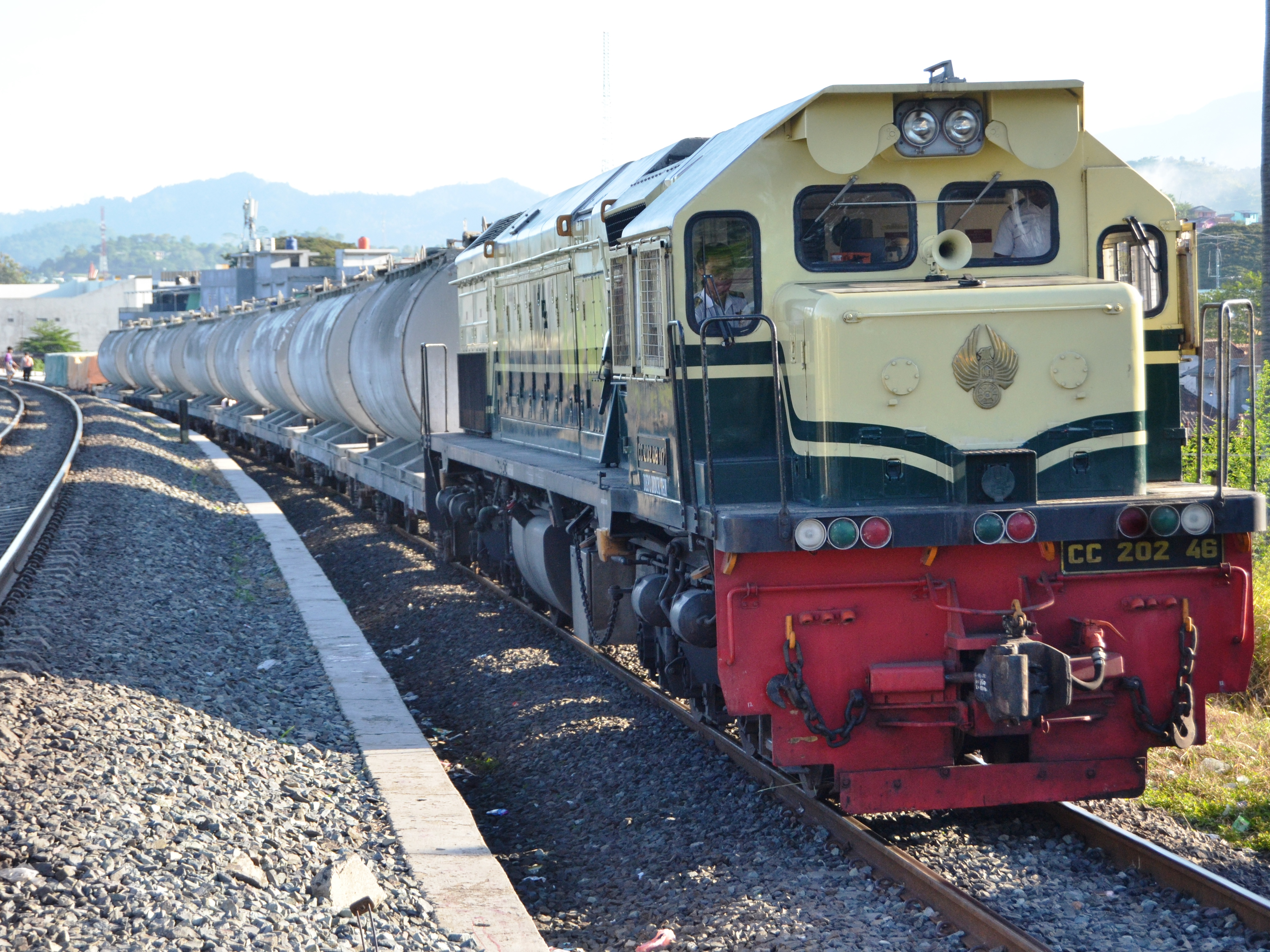
EMD G26MC-2U with PJKA livery pulling Cement train from Tigagajah to Pidada

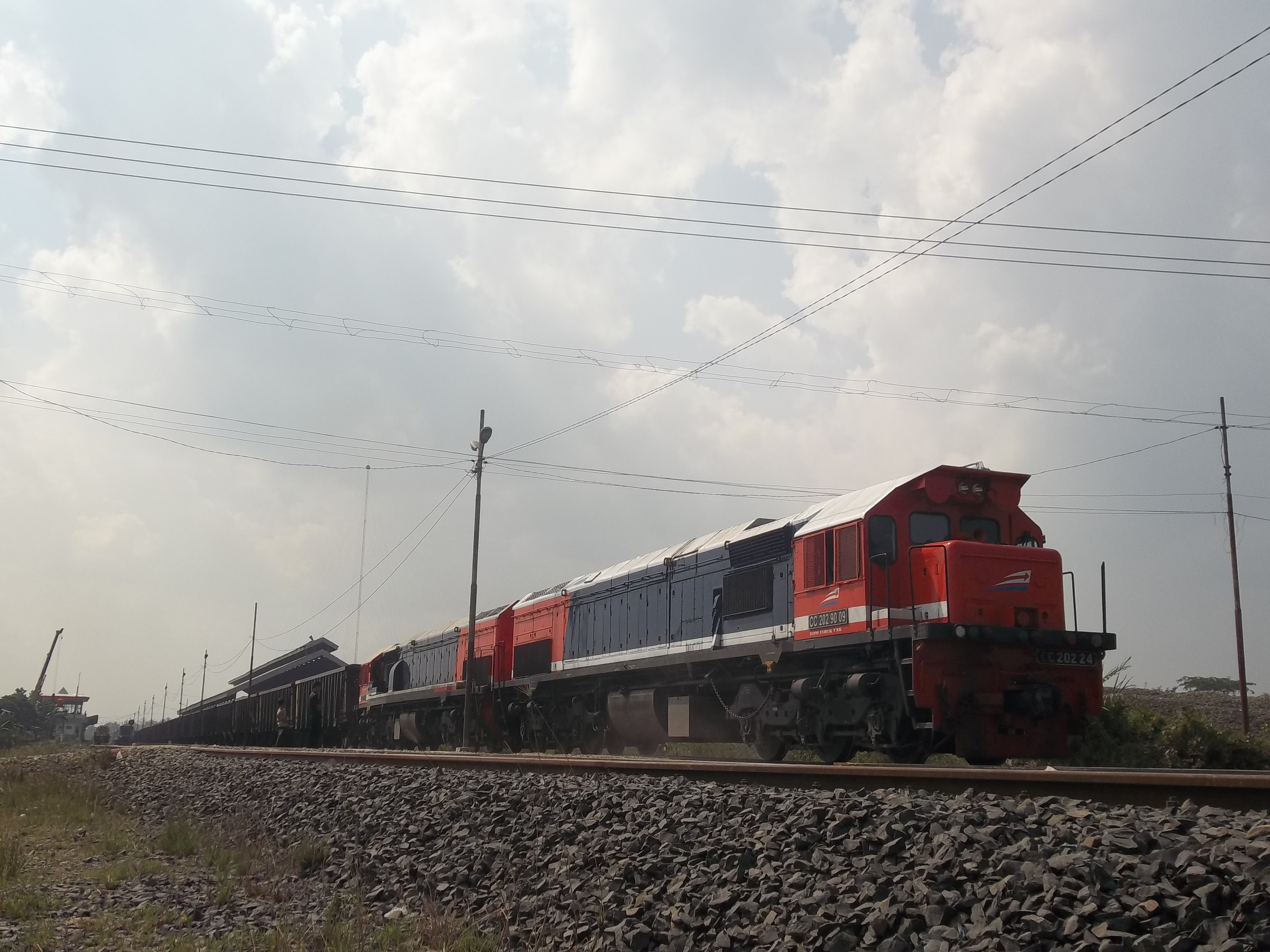
Double Traction EMD G26MC-2U or CC202 pulling long haul coal freight train near Rejosari Station, Lampung.

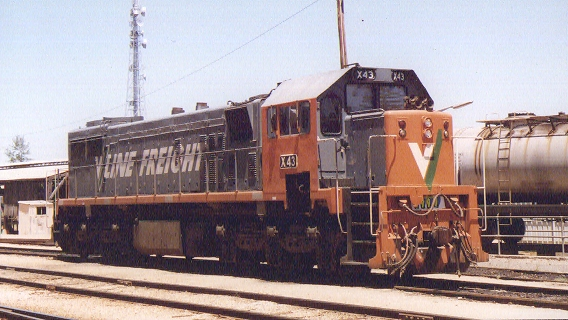
Australian G26C locomotive X43 in V/Line Freight livery.

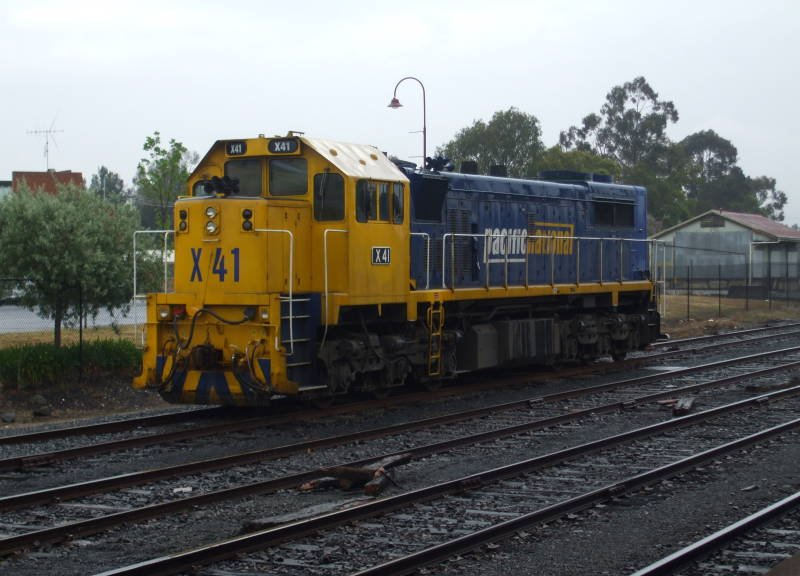
Australian G26C locomotive X41 in Pacific National livery.

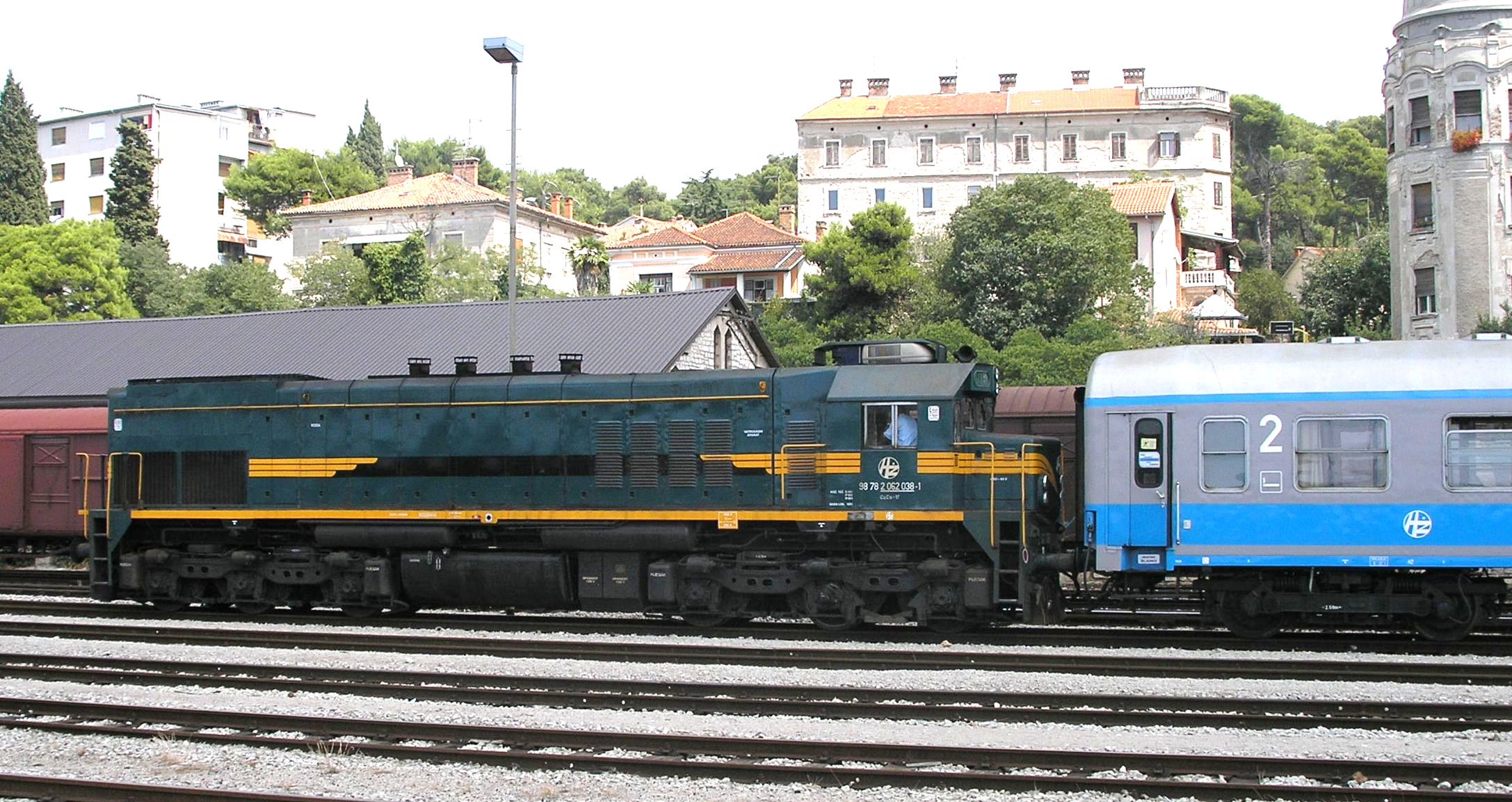
A Croatian EMD G26 in ex-JŽ livery

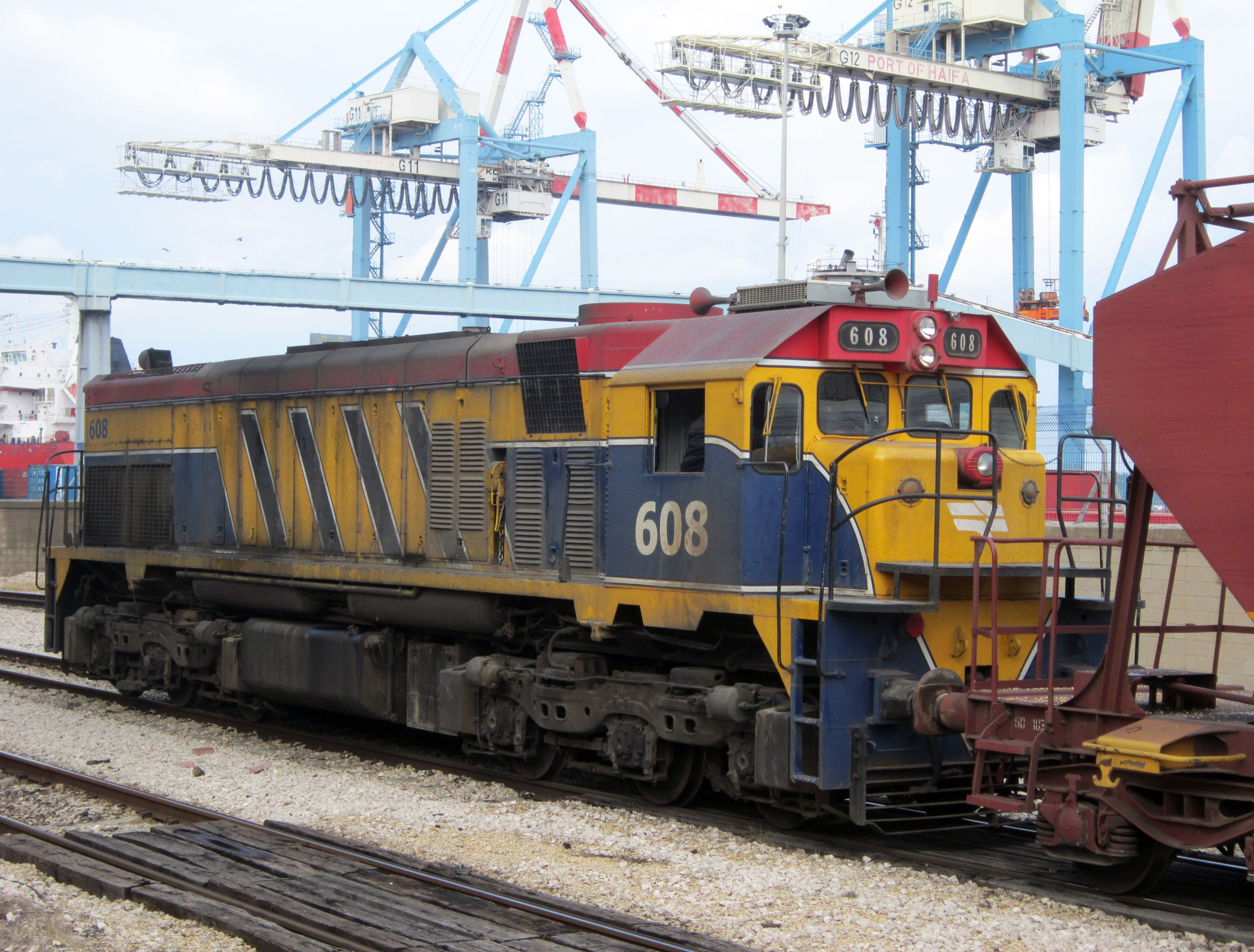
Israel Railways EMD G26CW

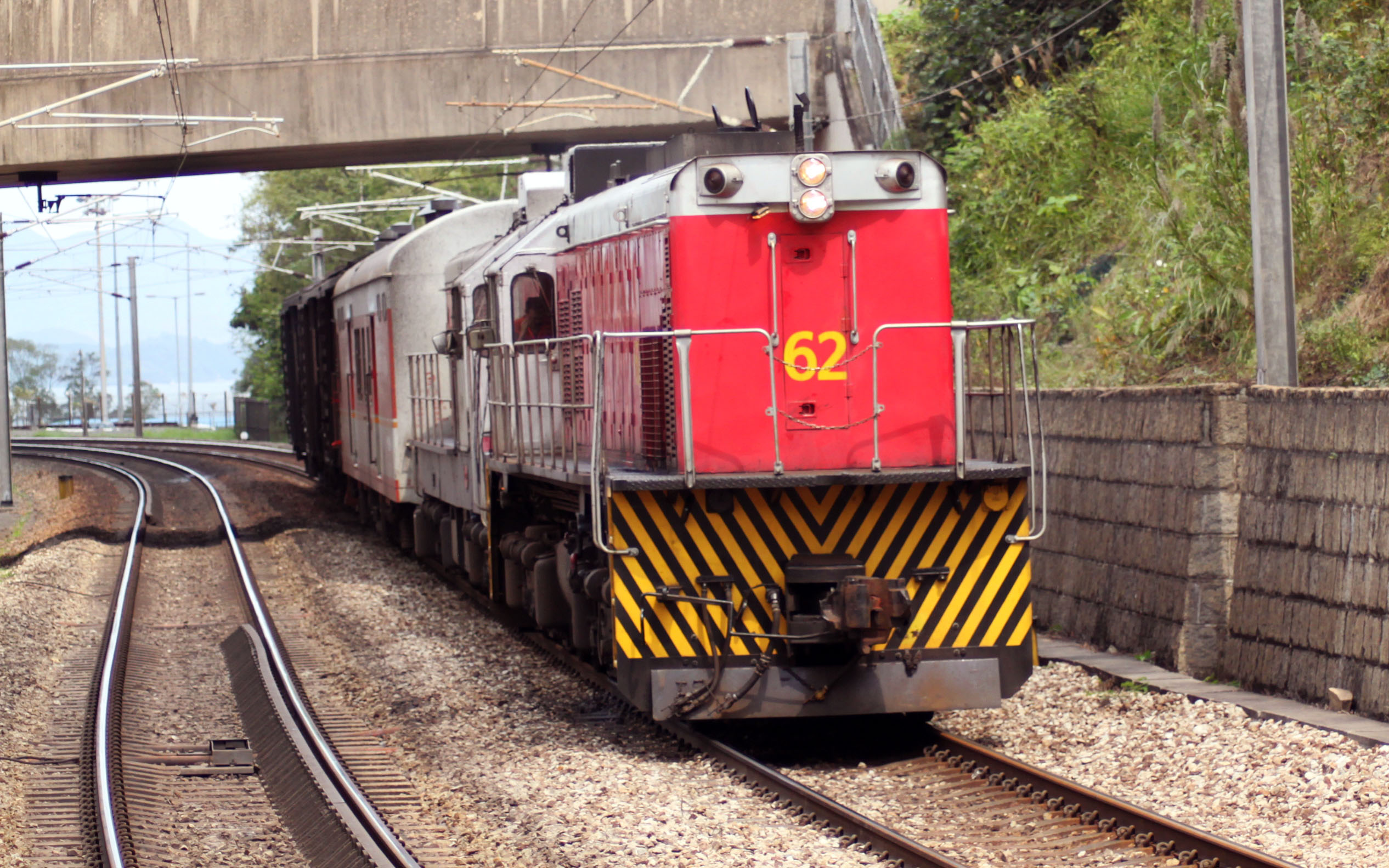
Kowloon-Canton Railway EMD G26CU

== See also ==
- EMD GP38-2 – a contemporary 16-645E-powered EMD locomotive of similar rating, but designed for the more permissive North American loading gauge and axle load limits
- List of GMD Locomotives
