= Tanjung Enim Coal Mine =

Coal mine in Indonesia

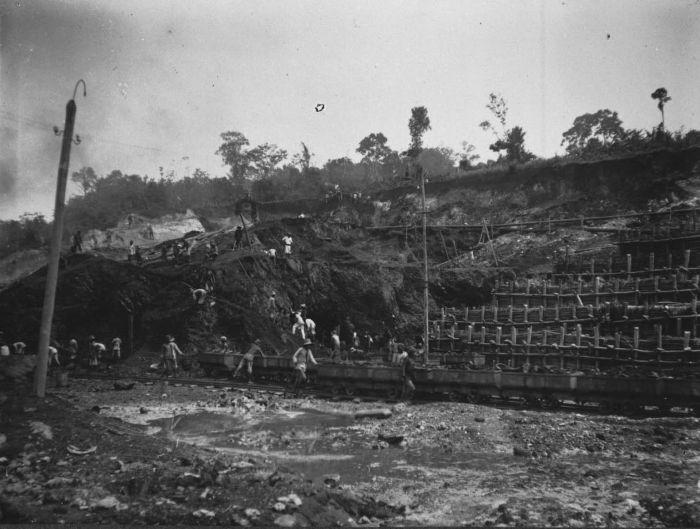
- The Tanjung Enim Coal Mine in 1921
- Location: Tanjung Enim, Sumatra, Indonesia
- Products: Coking coal
- Company: PT Bukit Asam Tbk

The Tanjung Enim Coal Mine is a coal mine located in Tanjung Enim, Muara Enim Regency, South Sumatra Province, Indonesia. The mine has coal reserves amounting to 6.36 billion tonnes of coking coal, one of the largest coal reserves in Asia and the world. The mine has an annual production capacity of 20 million tonnes of coal.
