= Rail transport in Croatia =

Croatian railway network
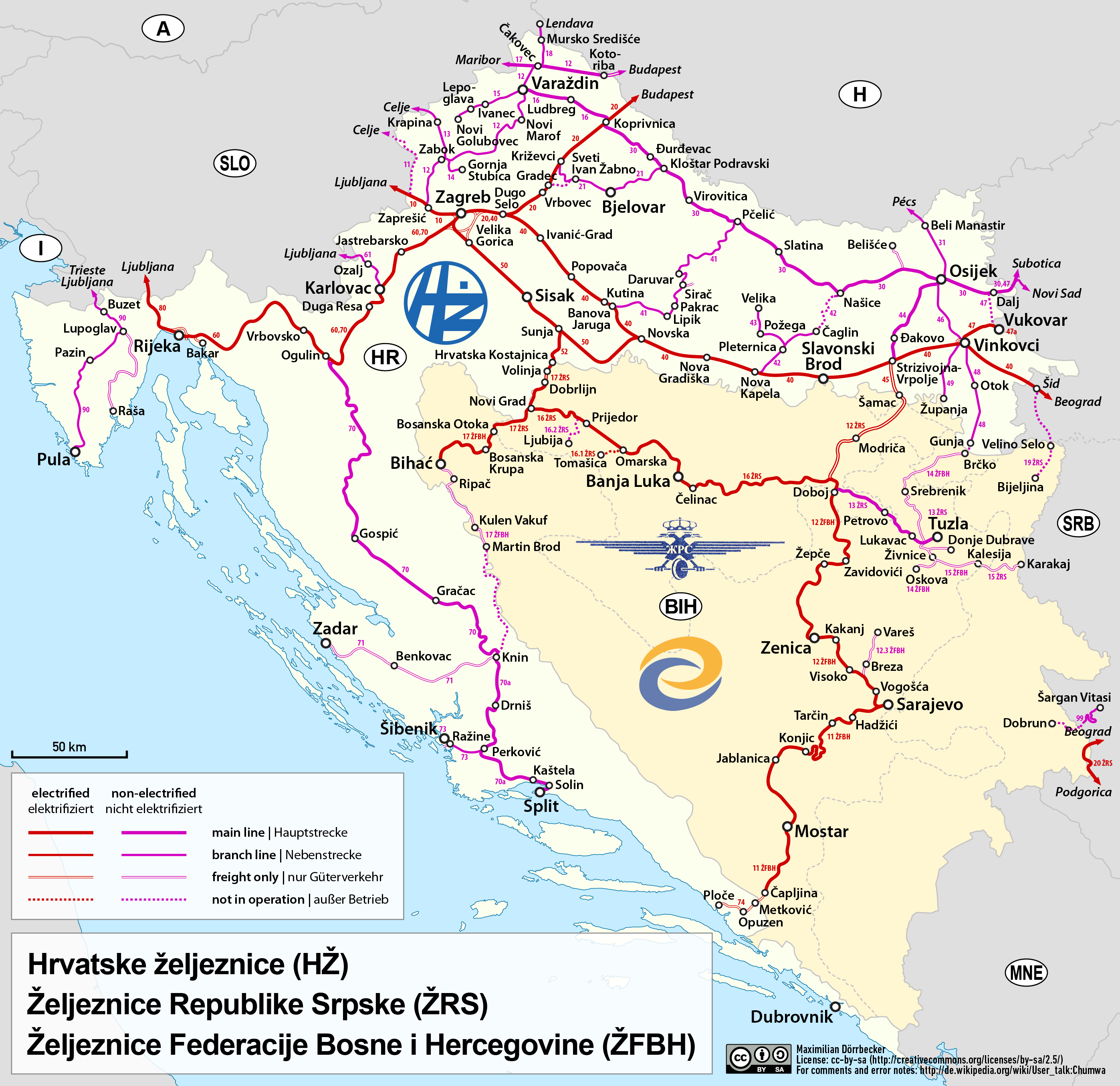
- Map of the network as well as interconnections, esp. to Bosnia and Herzegovina

Overview
- Headquarters: Zagreb
- Locale: Croatia
- Dates of operation: 1881–present

Technical
- Track gauge: 1,435 mm (4 ft 8 1/2 in)

Rail transport in Croatia has existed since the 19th century. Since the country's independence in the early 1990s, the state-owned Croatian Railways (Croatian: Hrvatske željeznice, HŽ) has maintained the tracks and the rolling stock. This company was since split into HŽ Passenger Transport, HŽ Infrastructure and HŽ Cargo.

== History ==
The first railway section on the territory of today's Republic of Croatia, then part of the Austrian Empire and Austria-Hungary, was built in 1860 in Međimurje: the railway line from Nagykanizsa in Hungary via Čakovec and Kotoriba continued to Pragerski in Slovenia. Although only a small part of the railway passed through Croatian territory (Međimurje was part of Croatia at the time the railway was built, but in January 1861 it was annexed to Hungary by the decision of Vienna) was built only 35 years after the first European railway, which was established in 1825 between the towns of Stockton and Darlington in England.

Railroads that connected Rijeka, the most important port in Croatia, with Trieste (and further with Vienna), and with Zagreb (and further with Budapest) were put into service in 1873.

Between World War I and the breakup of Yugoslavia, the railways in Croatia were operated by the state-owned Yugoslav Railways (JŽ).

Croatian Railways was founded in 1990 from the former Yugoslav Railways Zagreb Division, in the process of Croatia's secession from Yugoslavia. Its vehicle fleet was initially the one it inherited at the time of the breakup of Yugoslavia.

The company ceased to exist in 2006 and its assets were taken over by the newly founded company Hrvatske Željeznice Holding d.o.o. The operation was then provided by the holding's four subsidiaries for infrastructure management (HŽ Infrastruktura), passenger transport operation (HŽ Putnički prijevoz), freight transport operation (HŽ Cargo) and traction/locomotives (HŽ Vuča vlakova).

These companies were further split out in 2012 in accordance with EU Directive 91/440 HŽ Vuča vlakova was incorporated into HŽ Cargo at the same time.

== Power systems ==
The original decision in SFR Yugoslavia was to use 3 kV DC electrification for the railway network. This was performed on the Rijeka–Zagreb line, which due to the mountainous Gorski kotar region had a need for more powerful trains than the traditional diesel powered ones.

Beginning with the modernisation of the Zagreb–Belgrade railway line an electrification system of 25 kV/50 Hz was used. Electrification on other lines in Croatia was then made exclusively 25 kV/50 Hz. Later, the majority of the Zagreb–Rijeka line was re-electrified to 25 kV/50 Hz, but until December 2012 there was still a part that under 3 kV DC. Consequentially a power system break existed at Moravice. Croatian Railways was considering the purchase of dual-voltage locomotives, as an alternative to full re-electrification of 3 kV DC tracks, but the idea was scrapped for good as all electrified railways in Croatia are now using 25 kV/50 Hz.

All railway power systems in Croatia are exclusively of type overhead catenary.

== Rail tracks ==
The maximum permitted speed of trains on the tracks in Croatia is 160 km/h (99 mph). As far as the infrastructure is concerned, the specified speed can currently be achieved on part of the international corridor Novska - Tovarnik, more precisely on the relatively short sections Novska-Okučani and Vinkovci-Tovarnik.

The current rail speed record in Croatia is 185 km/h (115 mph). The record was set on the line between Novska and Nova Gradiška. The run was performed in order to demonstrate the possibilities offered by the Rade Končar built JŽ 442 electric locomotive class (now HŽ1142 train class).

The train protection system used, where applicable, is Indusi, a predecessor of a modern German system, Punktförmige Zugbeeinflussung.

The signaling system is at sight only, automatic block protection, on mainlines and where applicable.

== See also ==
- Transport in Croatia
- Croatian Railway Museum
