= Croatian railways =

Croatian railways may refer to:

- Croatian Railways, the national railway company that existed between 1990 and 2006
- Railways in Croatia
