= HŽ series 1142 =

Class of Croatian electric locomotives

Series 1142
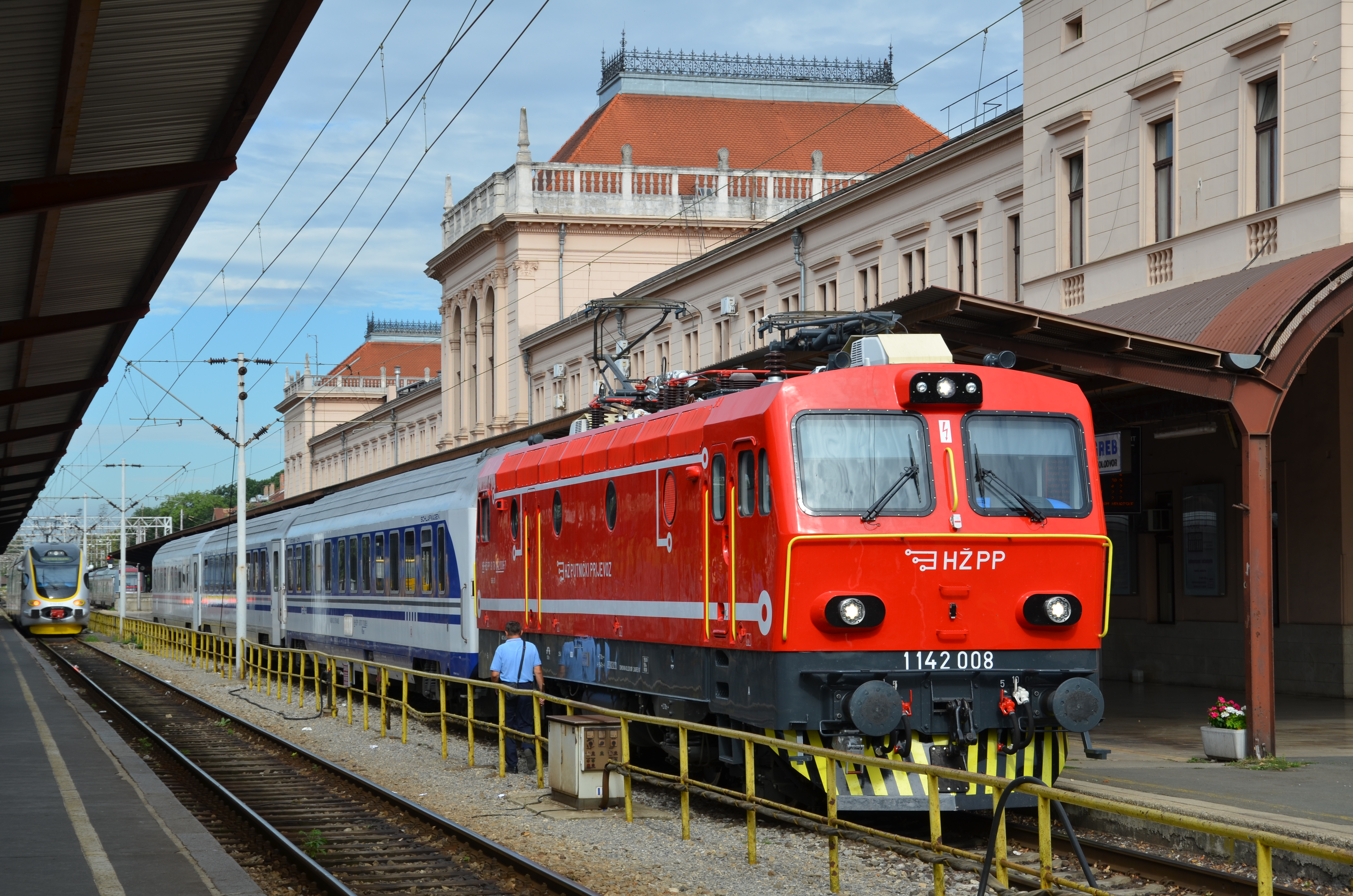
- HŽPP 1142 008 at Zagreb Rail Station
Type and origin
- Power type: Electric
- Builder: Končar Group
- Build date: Prototype: 1981; Production: 1984–1989
- Total produced: 16
Specifications
- Configuration
  - UIC: Bo′Bo′
- Gauge: 1,435 mm (4 ft 8 1/2 in)
- Length: 15,890 mm (52 ft 2 in)
- Height: 4,630 mm (15 ft 2 in)
- Electric system/s: 25 kV 50 Hz AC Catenary
- Current pickup: Pantograph
- Traction motors: RK IVK 644-8 (1,100 kW or 1,500 hp, 1330 A, 870 V)
Performance figures
- Maximum speed: 160 km/h (99 mph) (production series)
- Power output: 4,400 kW (5,900 hp)
Career
- Operators: HŽ
- Number in class: 15
- Numbers: In range 1142 001 – 1142 016
- Nicknames: "Lepa Brena" (former used in Yugoslavia), "Brena" (today in Croatia)
- Disposition: In service

1142 series is the fastest electrical locomotive on Croatian Railways (Croatian: Hrvatske željeznice, HŽ).

== History ==
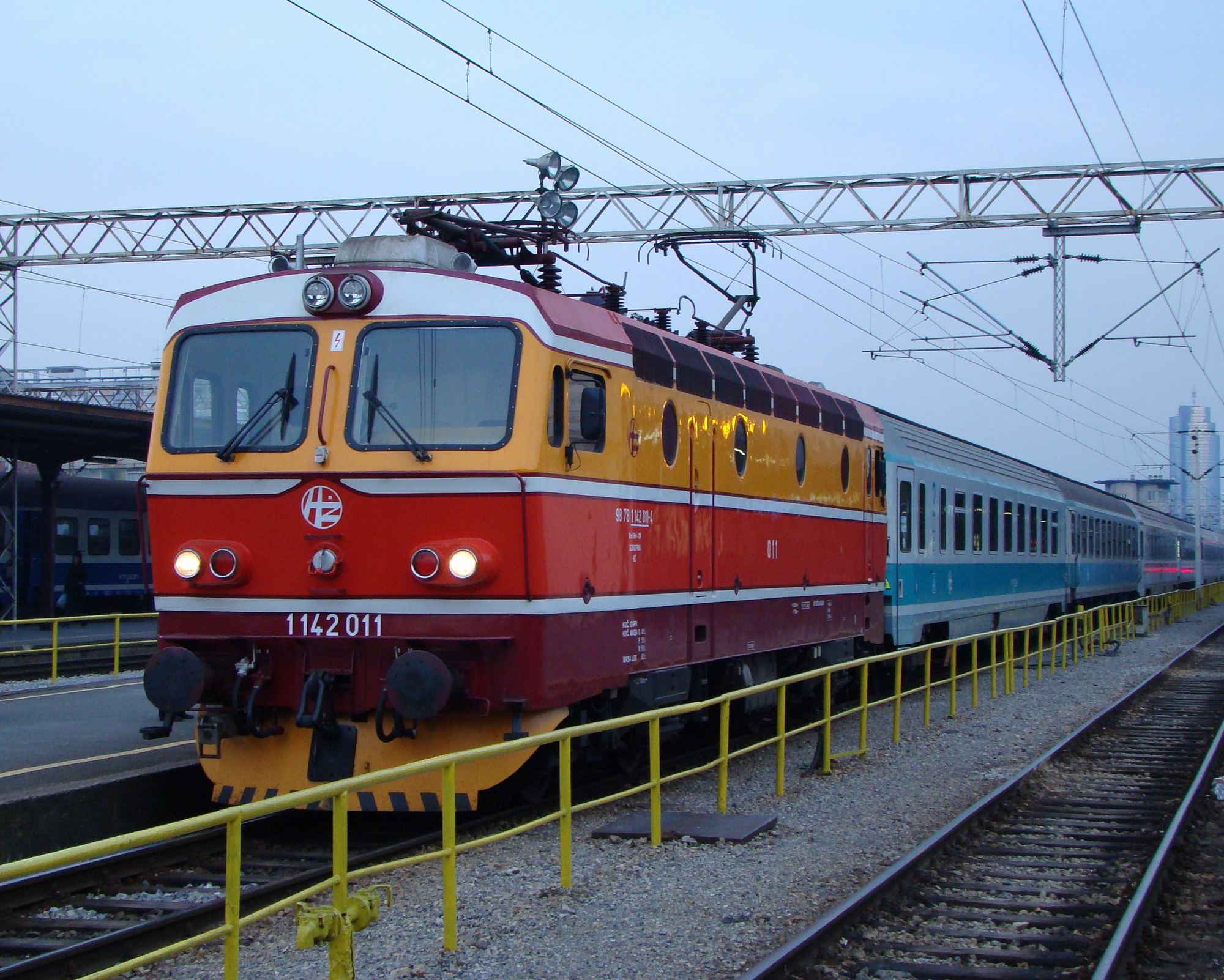
HŽ 1142 (old livery)

They were manufactured by the Končar factory (named after Rade Končar). Originally, they were a Yugoslav development (class 442), meant to be used in 80s as the fastest electrical powered locomotive. They remain the fastest Croatian locomotives today. At that time, as higher speeds became more and more important, former Yugoslav Railways (Croatian: Jugoslavenske željeznice) needed a locomotive, which could cope with the 160 km/h (99 mph) speed reachable on some of the mainlines. Therefore, this series was produced. It was planned that some of this units would be delivered throughout the then still existing SFRY. The dissolution stopped these plans, leaving HŽ as the only company, which has this class, from all the former SFRY states.

One 142 002 unit was destroyed in a diversion with a landmine laid on the railway track at the station Donja Vrba near Slavonski Brod on 16. August 1995 at 08:41 CET (06:41 GMT).

Three units were loaned to MÁV at some time in past.

== Maximum speed ==
The 1142 series reached a speed of 183.7 km/h (114.1 mph) on a prototype test run. This is still the Croatian speed record for any locomotive, since there are no official railway routes which allow for more than 160 km/h (99 mph). This prototype is still in regular use today, with speed limited to production series levels.

== Purpose ==
Originally, this series was conceived to be used for express passenger traffic, mainly on flat mainlines. It was sometimes deployed also on freight trains, but after the liquidation of HŽ Vuča vlakova d.o.o. they are used for passenger traffic exclusively as the rolling stock was divided between HŽ Cargo d.o.o. and HŽ Putnički prijevoz d.o.o.. All engines of the series 1142 thus became part of HŽ Putnički prijevoz d.o.o. rolling stock.

== Modernization ==
In September 2016, a contract was signed with the company Končar for the major repair and modernization of three electric locomotives of the 1142 series. As part of the modernization, a number of technological solutions were applied in order to reduce exploitation costs and improve the working conditions of the machine staff. The control and regulation system was replaced by a new computer-based microprocessor control. The steering wheel has been reconstructed and adapted to modern standards. New elements for managing the pneumatic brake, a new compressor and air dryer, as well as a new system for measuring and regulating speed and energy consumption were installed. The rear-view mirrors were replaced with four rear-view video cameras, and the existing headlights were replaced with a new version in LED technology. A new solution for painting the locomotive's paneling was also applied, in accordance with the current HŽPP visual identity introduced in April 2015.

== Nickname ==
Nowadays, this series has the nickname "Lepa Brena". It is interesting, how this name was given. At the time before dissolution of SFRY, there was a female singer with the artist name Lepa Brena. Translated this would mean "pretty Brena". Since this series was the pride of that time, like this popular female singer, this nickname prevailed until today, though usually shortening it to just "Brena".
