= InterCity =

Type of long-distance passenger trains

InterCity logo of the Deutsche Bundesbahn, 1971–1991

InterCity (commonly abbreviated IC on timetables and tickets) is the classification applied to certain long-distance passenger train services in Europe. Such trains (in contrast to InterRegio, regional, local, or commuter trains) generally call at major stations only.

An international variant of the InterCity trains are the EuroCity (EC) trains, which consist of high-standard coaches and are run by a variety of operators.

== History ==
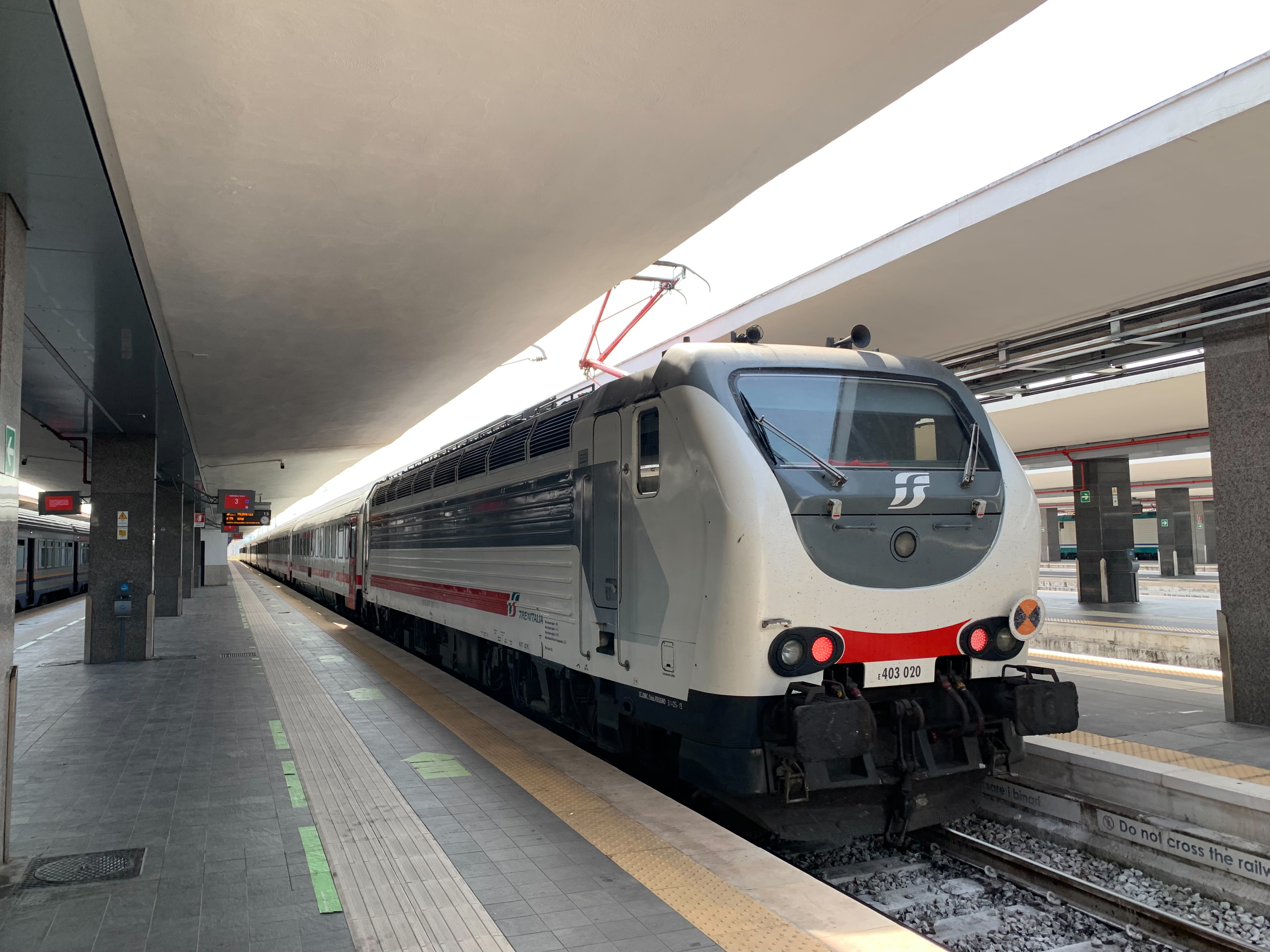
An InterCity train at Napoli Centrale, Italy

The use of Inter-City started in the United Kingdom: A daily train of that name was introduced in 1950, running between the cities of London, Birmingham and Wolverhampton. This usage can claim to be the origin of all later usages worldwide.

In 1966 British Rail introduced the brand, initially written 'Inter-City', for all of its express train routes, and in 1986 the term was adopted by the InterCity sector of British Rail. Following the privatisation of the railways in Great Britain, the term is no longer in official use there although many people still refer to fast long-distance services as InterCity trains. The brand still exists and belongs to the Department for Transport.

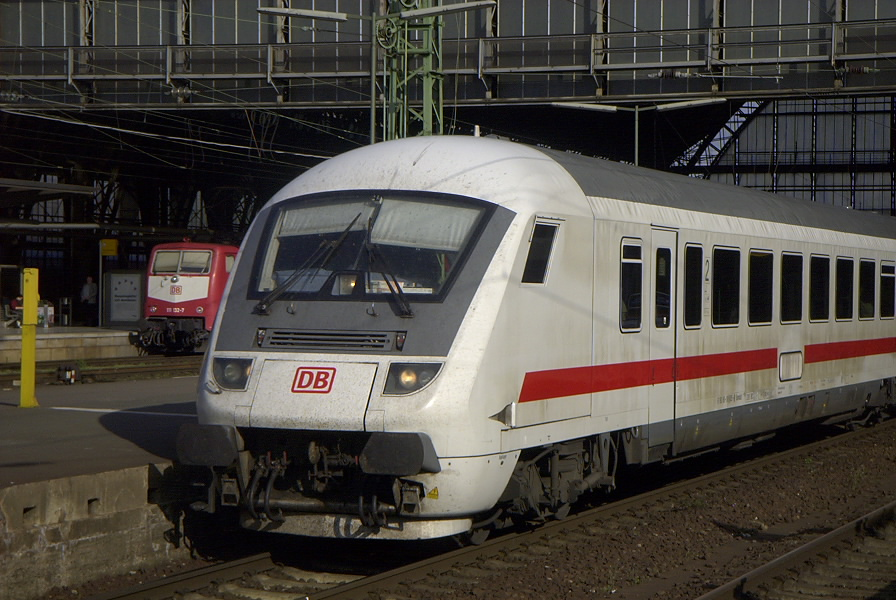
DB InterCity cab car in Bremen Hbf

In West Germany, the Deutsche Bundesbahn first used the name (then written Intercity) in 1968, denoting special first-class services on the F-Zug train network. Many of the Class VT 11.5 diesel multiple units formerly used on the TEE network were converted for early Intercity services.

In Switzerland, the InterCity brand replaced SwissExpress in the 1982 schedule.

In Norway, intercity (later also written InterCity) trains were introduced in 1975 on the Vestfold Line (the Oslo-Skien service), later also on the Østfold Line (Oslo-Halden). They were (relatively) fast trains on distances up to 2–3 hours. Today, the category is called Fjerntog.

An international variant of InterCity, EuroCity (EC), was introduced in May 1987. EuroCity trains consist of high-standard, air conditioned coaches, are run by a variety of operators, and are usually subject to on-board border controls. For example, EuroCity trains running in Germany can be made up by rolling stock of either the SBB (Switzerland), ÖBB (Austria), SNCF (France), and less commonly by stock of the Czech ČD and Hungarian MÁV railways.

== InterCity by country ==
=== Austria ===
InterCity symbol of ÖBB

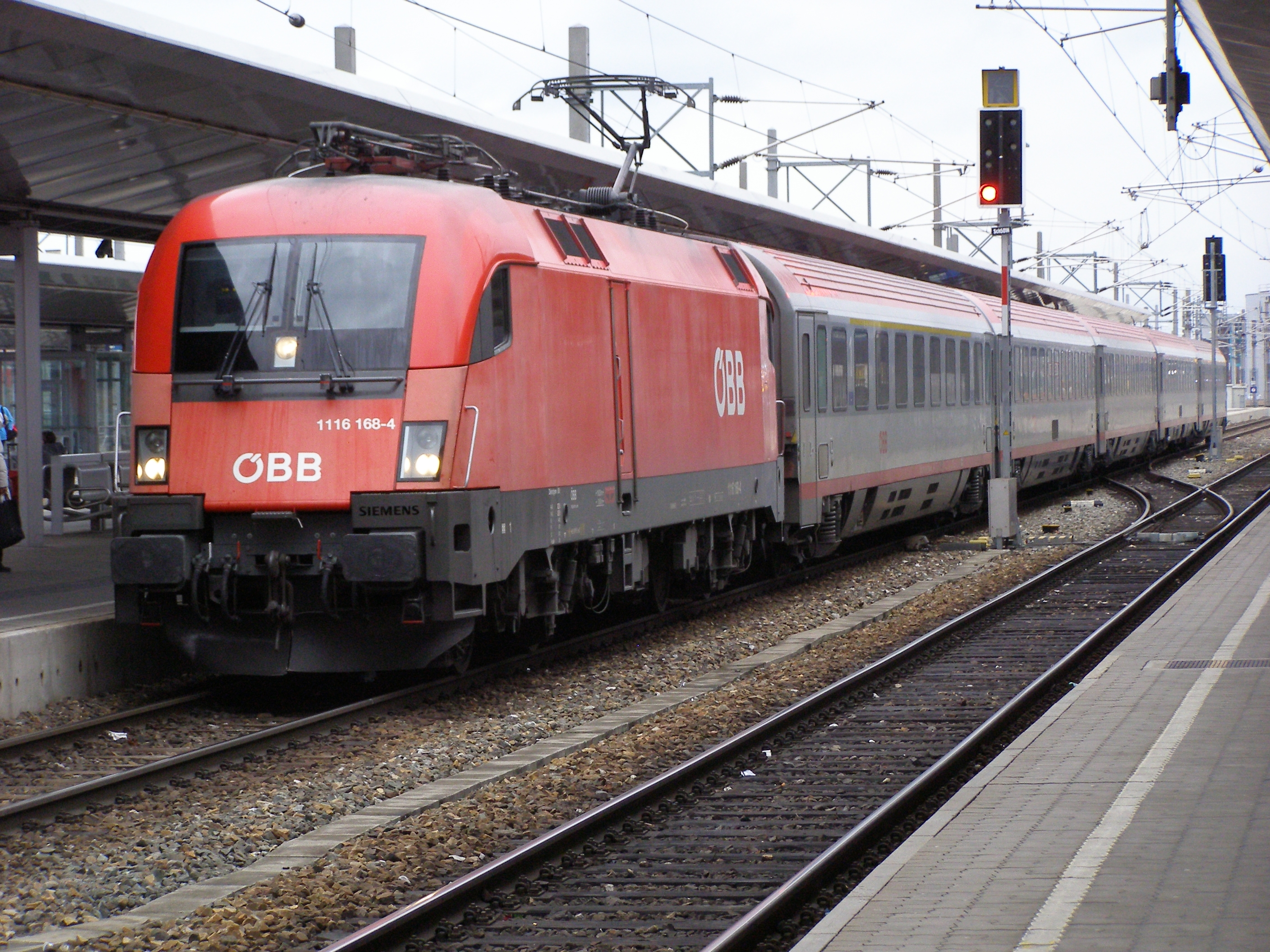
Austrian InterCity train in Wien Meidling

The Austrian Federal Railways (ÖBB) have operated IC services since 1991. However, unlike in most other countries, these are often little more than regional rail, as most long-distance, high-standard trains in Austria are likely to be EuroCity (EC) services, even when not leaving the Austrian borders (named ÖBB-EuroCity until 2011). Modernised stock of Eurofima coaches is used under the brand name ÖBB-InterCity (OIC) mainly on the Austrian Western and Southern Railways from Vienna to Salzburg and Villach.

The ÖBB also deployed electric multiple unit trains, from 2006 also three ICE T (Class 411, named ÖBB 4011) trainsets in cooperation with the Deutsche Bahn, currently running from Vienna to Frankfurt via Linz and Passau. ÖBB high-speed rail service is provided by Railjet (RJ) trains.

Since 2011, there is an hourly express train service on the Western Railway operated by WESTbahn, the only long-distance competitor of the ÖBB.

Since the 2025 timetable change, the former Railjet services running from Vienna to Salzburg, are operated by KISS double-decker trains bought from the Deutsche Bahn.

IC-Services:

- Western Railway
  - Vienna–Linz–Salzburg (trains are operated by KISS double-decker trains from 5 am to 10 pm hourly)
- Southern Railway
  - Vienna–Bruck an der Mur–Villach (Südbahn Express)
  - Vienna–Wiener Neustadt–Mattersburg–Sopron–Csorna
- Enns Valley Railway
  - Graz–Leoben–Bischofshofen–Schwarzach/St. Veit–Innsbruck (1 EC train per day to Zürich).
  - Villach–Bischofshofen–Salzburg (trains operating every 2 hours)

InterCity stops in Austria:

- Western railway: Wien Westbahnhof, Wien Hütteldorf, Tullnerfeld, St. Pölten Hauptbahnhof, Amstetten, St. Valentin, Linz Hauptbahnhof, Wels Hauptbahnhof, Attnang-Puchheim, Vöcklabruck, Salzburg Hauptbahnhof
- Southern railway: Wien Südbahnhof, Wien Meidling, Wiener Neustadt Hauptbahnhof, Mürzzuschlag, Bruck an der Mur, Frohnleiten, Graz Hauptbahnhof, Wildon, Leibniz, Spielfeld-Straß
- Line from Bruck an der Mur to Villach: Bruck an der Mur, Leoben Hauptbahnhof, Knittelfeld, Zeltweg, Judenburg, Unzmarkt, Friesach in Kärnten, Treibach-Althofen, St.Veit an der Glan, Klagenfurt Hauptbahnhof, Krumpendorf am Wörthersee, Pörtschach am Wörthersee, Velden am Wörthersee, Villach Hauptbahnhof
- Line from Villach to Salzburg: Villach Hauptbahnhof, Spittal-Millstättersee, Mallnitz-Obervellach, Bad Gastein, Bad Hofgastein, Dorfgastein, Schwarzach-St.Veit, St. Johann im Pongau, Bischofshofen, Werfen, Golling-Abtenau, Hallein, Salzburg Süd, Salzburg Hauptbahnhof

=== Belgium ===
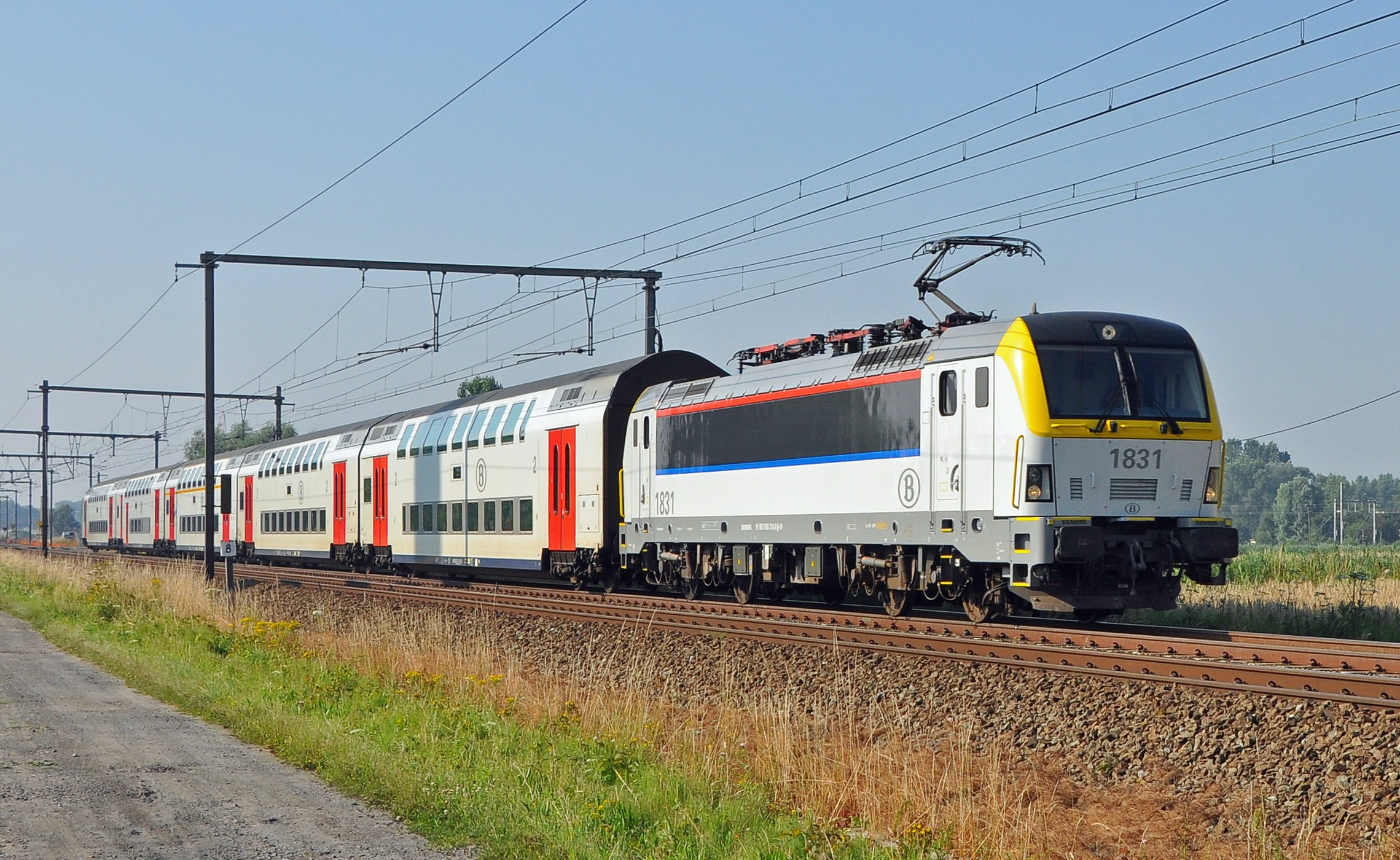
InterCity Genk – Brussels – Brugge – Blankenberge

InterCity trains link all major cities of Belgium. Some of them serve also destinations outside the country. The IC between Liège and Brussels travels at 200 km/h on the HSL 2. However, because of the density of the train network with many connecting lines and the many small- and medium-sized cities in Belgium, most IC services also call at smaller stations or continue as local trains on branch lines.

=== Croatia ===
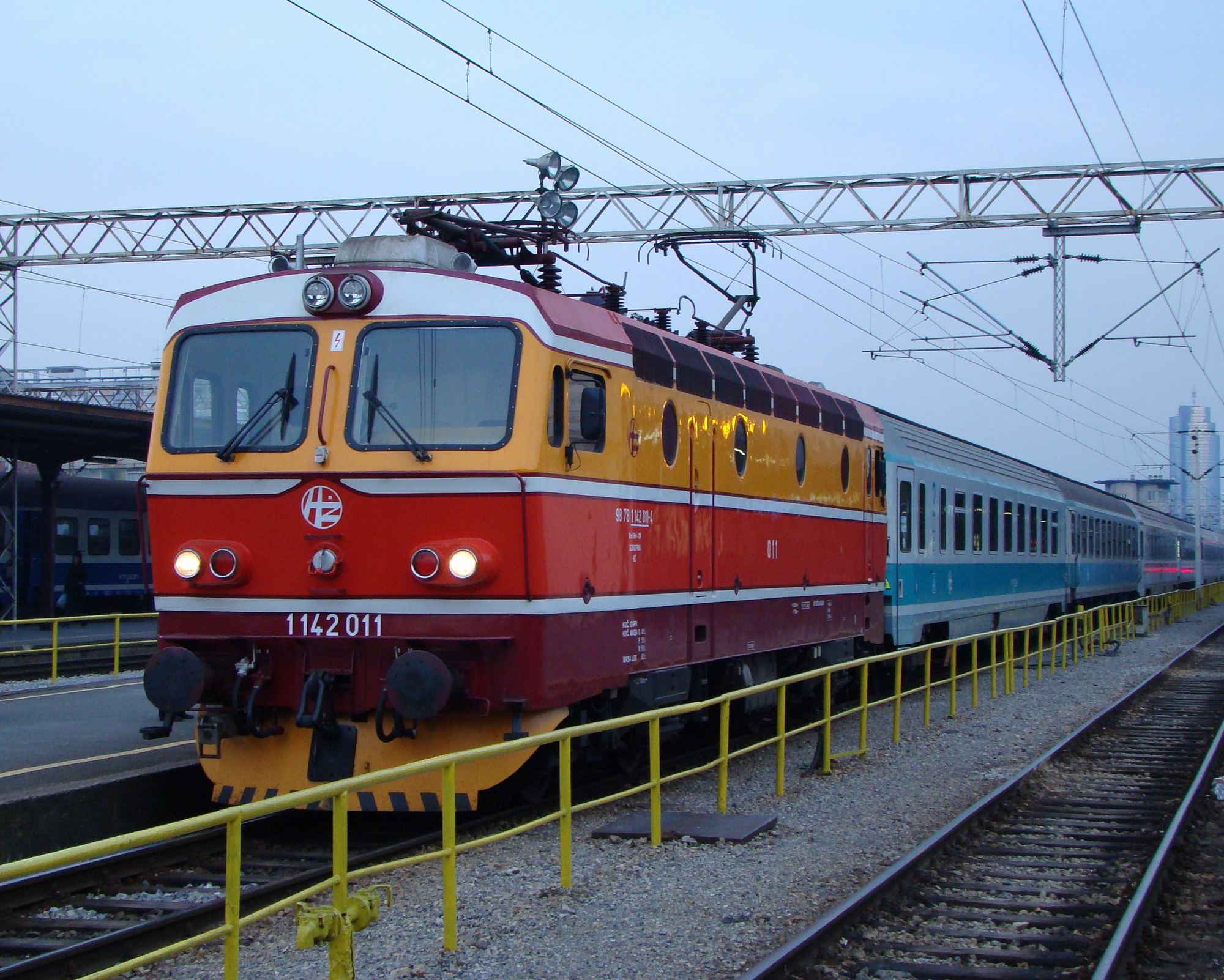
HŽ series 1142 locomotive hauling an InterCity train at the Zagreb Main Station

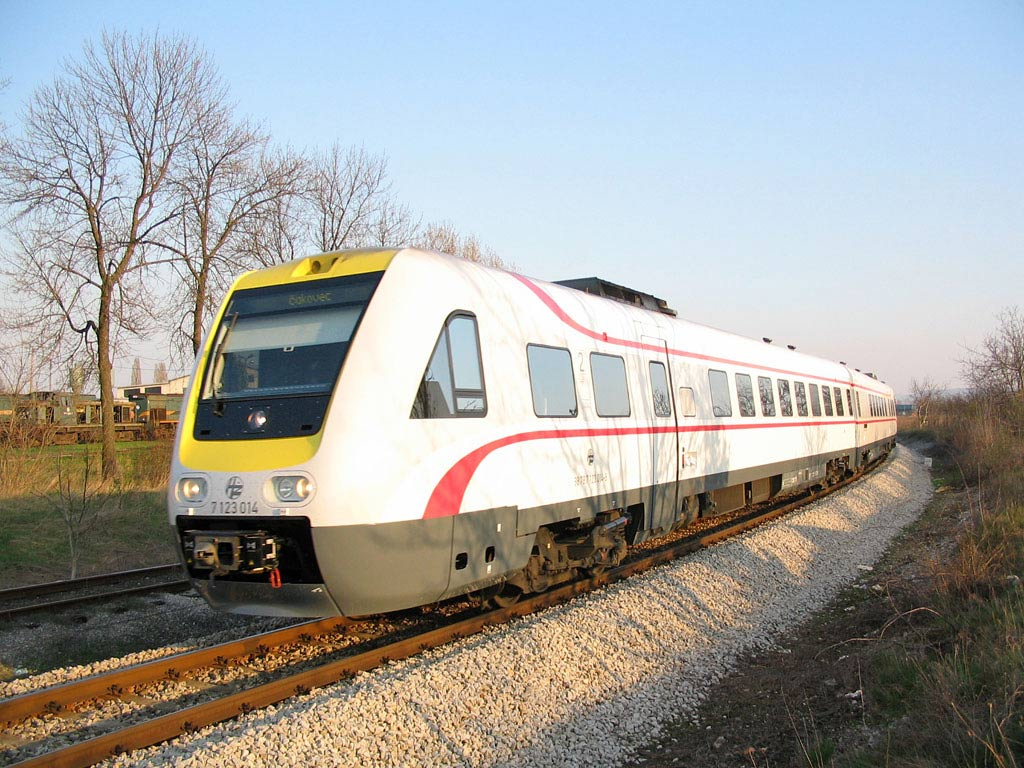
ICN Tilting Train on the Zagreb – Split route

As of 2024, there are two InterCity services:

- IC Podravka (Zagreb – Osijek)
- IC Agram (Zagreb – Budapest)

The coaches used are similar to the ones used in Germany by DB.

Trains Slavonija and Cibalia connecting Zagreb and Vinkovci were part of IC network up to 2023, when they were downgraded to fast train (B). Speeds were up to 160 km/h between Slavonski Brod and Vinkovci.

Line Zagreb – Split served by tilting trains is designated as InterCity Nagibni (ICN).

=== Czech Republic ===
In the Czech Republic, the IC or Express trains service the following routes:

- Bohumín–Břeclav,
- Bohumín–Prague,
- Třinec–Prague,
- Cheb–Prague,
- Havířov–Prague.
- České Budějovice–Prague

Most of the IC are served by trains of state-owned operator České dráhy with speeds up to 160 km/h but they have been converted into category Express in 2012 timetable. The other is served by trains of private operator RegioJet with speed up to 160 km/h. No surcharge is applied to IC trains but RegioJet runs reservation compulsory trains. A third private passenger operator, LEO Express, introduced express InterCity train services between Prague and Ostrava in November 2012, with speeds up to 160 km/h.

The state-owned operator České dráhy also serves the line Prague–Ostrava (with some connections extended to Bohumín and Františkovy Lázně) with Pendolino trainsets under the designation "SuperCity", which conforms to IC standards. A compulsory reservation is applied on these trains, which are allowed to run at speeds up to 200 km/h since 2025.

=== Denmark ===
The Intercity network of the Danish State Railways consists of IC trains and their faster version, Lyntog (Lightning Train), which is identical but with fewer stops. Each train type operates hourly between the eastern terminus at Copenhagen and westwards to Odense–Århus–Ålborg, and less frequently to alternative destinations in Jutland. These are run by IC3 diesel materiel since most of the network is not electrified. There are also electrical IC trains run by IR4s in an hourly schedule from Copenhagen westwards to Odense and alternately Esbjerg/Sønderborg. This means during most of the day there are three trains an hour between Copenhagen and Odense. Quite unusual in the world, some trains will consist of both electrically and diesel-powered units coupled together. Being the only option for long-distance and some short-distance travel, there is no surcharge for IC and Lyntog. They have a maximum speed of 180 km/h. Additionally, there are a few IR trains during Friday and Sunday peak hours between Copenhagen and Århus. These are locomotive-run and have bilevel cars. The IC3 trains are planned to be replaced by new IC4 trains, originally in 2001. They first ran with passengers in 2008, but haven't nearly replaced the IC3 yet. It is now planned to give the IC3 stock a 10-year life extension, and to eventually scrap IC4 trains, due to the plague of poor reliability. IR4 stock (Electric version of IC3) will release IC3 stock from the Esbjerg Line, allowing some IC3 trains to replace IC4 trains.

=== Finland ===
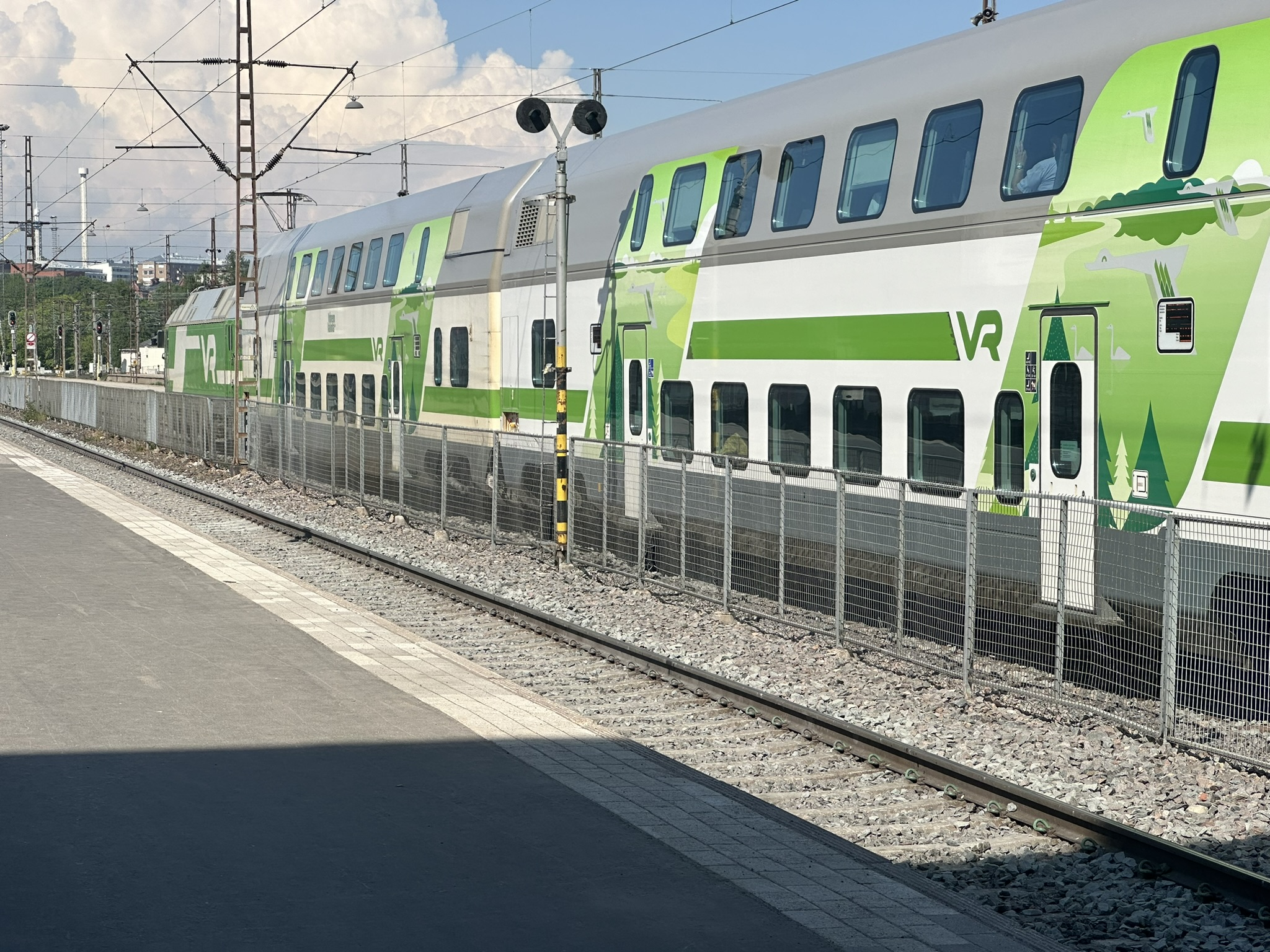
An InterCity train pulled by a Sr3 locomotive at Helsinki Central

In Finland, VR has operated InterCity trains between major Finnish cities since August 1988. The first routes were Helsinki–Vaasa and Helsinki–Imatra, which later expanded to all major cities and include for instance Helsinki–Tampere–Oulu–Rovaniemi, Helsinki–Turku, Helsinki–Iisalmi and Helsinki–Joensuu. Double-deck InterCity trains have become the standard as the Finnish long-distance rail travel having replaced the blue-carriaged express trains.

The trains run at a maximum speed of up to 200 kilometres per hour (120 mph). Only the Pendolino trains are faster than InterCity trains in Finland.

=== France ===
In 2006, the SNCF rebranded Corail, Téoz and Lunéa services as 'Intercités', a brand for all of their 'classic' services day and night.

=== Germany ===
In Germany, the InterCity network was launched in 1971 to accompany and eventually replace the Trans Europ Express trains. At first, IC services were first-class only, often using TEE stock and the then-new Class 103 locomotives. Trains ran bi-hourly. DB paid a royalty fee to BR for many years for the use of the brand name.

In 1978, it was decided to expand the IC network to services with both first and second class, and so the new scheme, called IC '79 was launched in 1979 with the motto "Jede Stunde, jede Klasse" ("every hour, every class") to emphasize its new structure. Large numbers of air-conditioned open coach cars, the Bpmz 291, were built for InterCity services, which at first were using the TEE colour scheme. In 1985, with many of the TEE trains gone and the introduction of the InterRegio, the network was expanded again, now covering virtually any major city of then-West Germany. It faced further changes after the German reunification and the introduction of the InterCityExpress in the early 1990s.

Today, after the abolition of the InterRegio in 2002, most long-distance connections in Germany are either IC or ICE trains; they most commonly offer at least bi-hourly service. Maximum speed for an IC is 200 km/h.

=== Greece ===
In Greece, InterCity trains operated by Italian government-owned Hellenic Train run in the following routes:

- Athens–Lamia–Larissa–Thessaloniki

=== Hungary ===
In Hungary the first InterCity train departed in 1991, since then almost 10 million people use these trains every year. Since then almost 250 InterCity trains operate in the country.

Intercity train services in Hungary:

- Budapest Déli pu–Zalaegerszeg (every 2 hours)
- Budapest Déli pu–Keszthely (every 2 hours)
- Budapest Keleti pu–Pécs (every 2 hours)
- Budapest Keleti pu–Kaposvár–Gyékényes (once a day)
- Budapest Keleti pu–Kaposvár (twice a day)
- Budapest Keleti pu– Miskolc–Tiszai–Debrecen–Budapest Nyugati pu (every 2 hours)
- Budapest Keleti pu–Miskolc–Tiszai-Košice (every hour, with separate cars to Sátoraljaújhely)
- Budapest Keleti pu–Győr–Sopron (every 2 hours)
- Budapest Keleti pu–Győr–Szombathely (every 2 hours, certain trains to Szentgotthárd/Graz/Ljubljana)
- Budapest Keleti pu–Békéscsaba–Arad/Craiova/Cluj-Napoca/Timișoara/București-Nord (eight times a day)
- Budapest Keleti pu-Békéscsaba (four times a day)
- Budapest Keleti pu–Debrecen–Brașov (twice a day)
- Budapest Nyugati pu–Nyíregyháza–Záhony (every 2 hours)
- Budapest Nyugati pu–Szeged (every hour)
- Budapest Nyugati pu–Mukachevo (once a day)

The Hungarian intercity trains are operated by MÁV-START, the Hungarian railway company.

=== Ireland ===
In the Republic of Ireland, Iarnród Éireann introduced the brand name InterCity in 1984, replacing the previous name of Mainline, which had been introduced in 1976. Initially applied to services operated by British Rail Mark 3 trains, it was later extended to include all services not part of the Dublin Suburban Rail network. Today the brand encompasses services between Dublin and Cork, Galway, Limerick, Tralee, Waterford, Sligo, Westport, Rosslare Europort, Ballina, and Ennis, as well as some regional services. A new InterCity logo was introduced in 2006, though the vast majority of rolling stock bore the original script logo and orange-tan livery until the final Mark 3 set was withdrawn in 2009. Since Ireland completed its replacement of the old Mark 2 and Mark 3 stock in 2012, it has one of the most modern InterCity fleets in the world.

Northern Ireland Railways and Iarnród Éireann both formerly operated trains on the Dublin–Belfast line under the InterCity brand, however this was replaced with the revived Enterprise brand name upon the introduction of the De Dietrich Ferroviaire rolling stock in 1997. This, coupled with the subsequent withdrawal of most coaching stock bearing the logo and the rebrand to the Translink name, means that the InterCity brand has largely disappeared from Northern Ireland Railways.

=== Italy ===
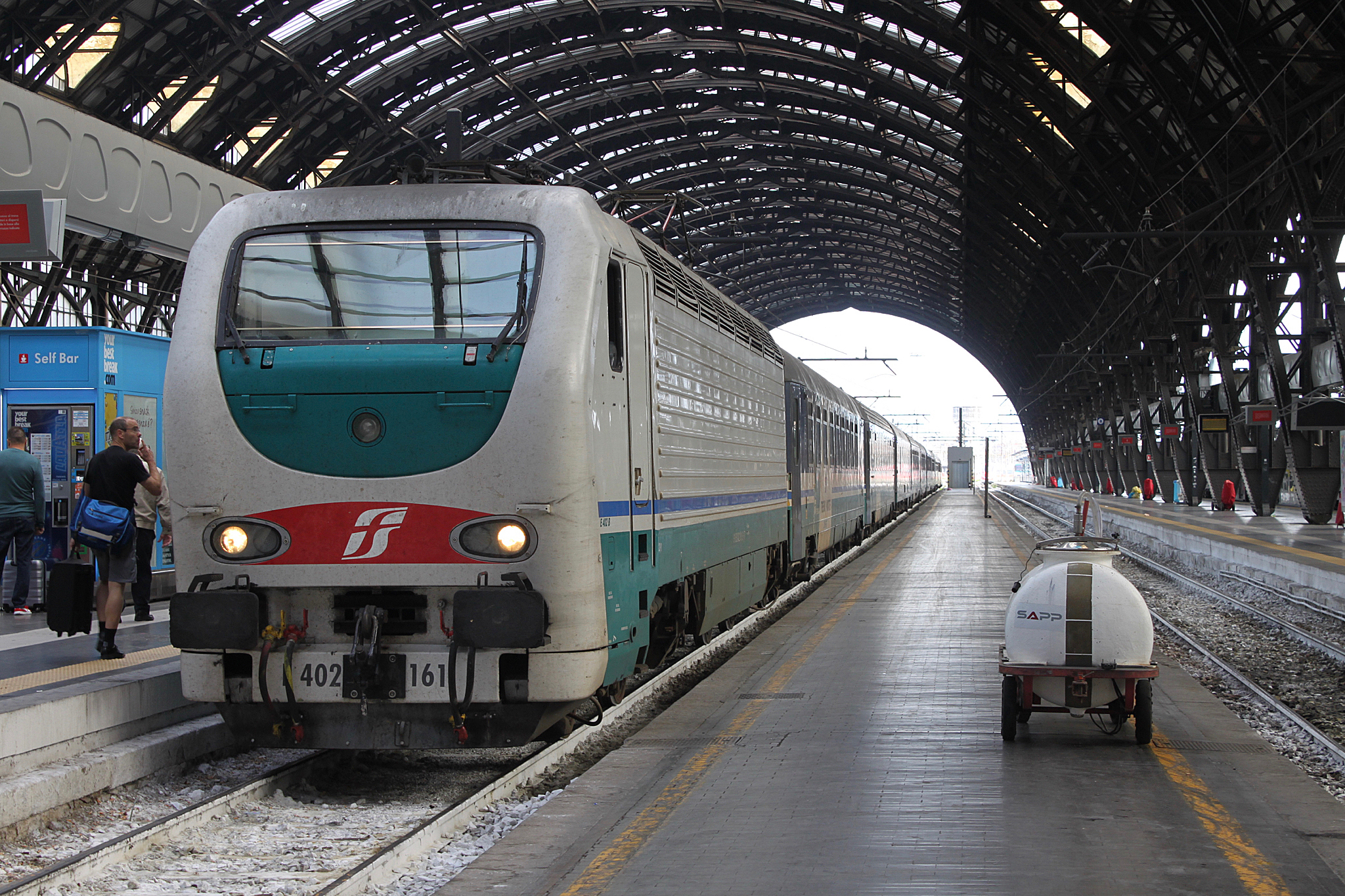
An Italian InterCity train at Milano Centrale railway station

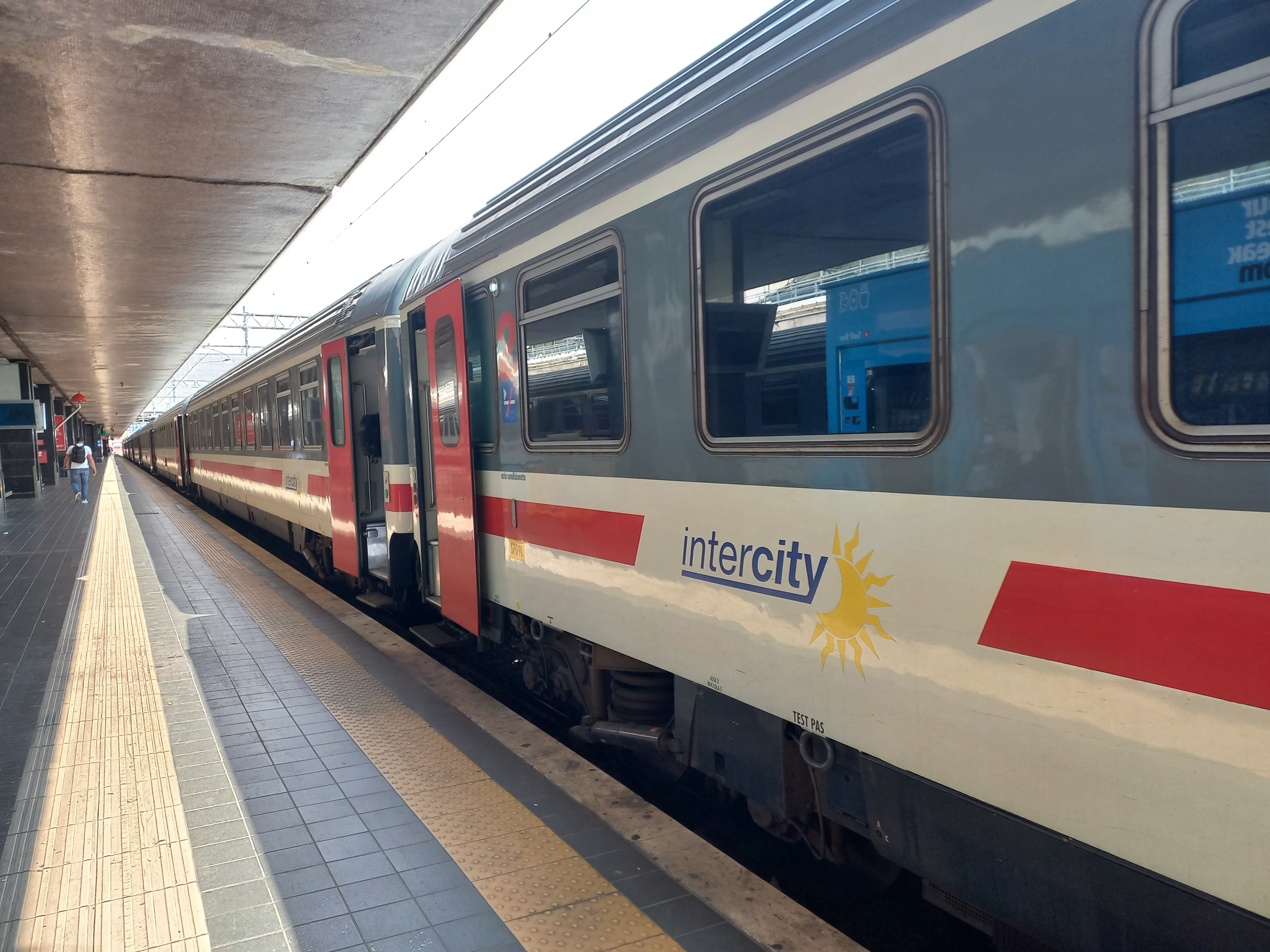
An Italian InterCity train at Roma Termini railway station

In Italy, InterCity trains constitute a capillary network that links the main cities across the peninsula. There were over 80 day (InterCity Sun) and night (InterCity Notte) services. Things changed with the opening of high-speed lines and the mixed public-private service. With the introduction of high-speed trains, intercity trains are limited to few services per day on mainline and regional tracks.

The daytime services (InterCity IC), while not frequent and limited to one or two trains per route, are essential in providing access to cities and towns off the railway's mainline network. The main routes are Trieste to Rome (stopping at Venice, Bologna, Prato, Florence and Arezzo), Milan to Rome (stopping at Genoa, La Spezia, Pisa and Livorno / stopping at Parma, Modena, Bologna, Prato, Florence and Arezzo), Bologna to Lecce (stopping at Rimini, Ancona, Pescara, Bari and Brindisi) and Rome to Reggio di Calabria (stopping at Latina and Naples). In addition, the Intercity trains provide a more economical means of long-distance rail travel within Italy.

The night trains (Intercity Notte ICN) have sleeper compartments and washrooms, but no showers on board (available only for Excelsior carriages). Main routes are Rome to Bolzano/Bozen (calling at Florence, Bologna, Verona, Rovereto and Trento), Milan to Lecce (calling at Piacenza, Parma, Reggio Emilia, Modena, Bologna, Faenza, Forlì, Cesena, Rimini, Ancona, Pescara, Bari and Brindisi), Turin to Lecce (calling at Alessandria, Voghera, Piacenza, Parma, Bologna, Rimini, Pescara, Termoli, San Severo, Foggia, Barletta, Bisceglie, Molfetta, Bari, Monopoli, Fasano, Ostuni and Brindisi) and Reggio di Calabria to Turin (calling at Naples, Rome, Livorno, La Spezia and Genova). Most portions of these ICN services run during the night; since most services take 10 to 15 hours to complete a one-way journey, their day-time portion provide extra train connections to complement with the Intercity services.

There are a total of 86 intercity trains running within Italy per day.

=== Netherlands ===
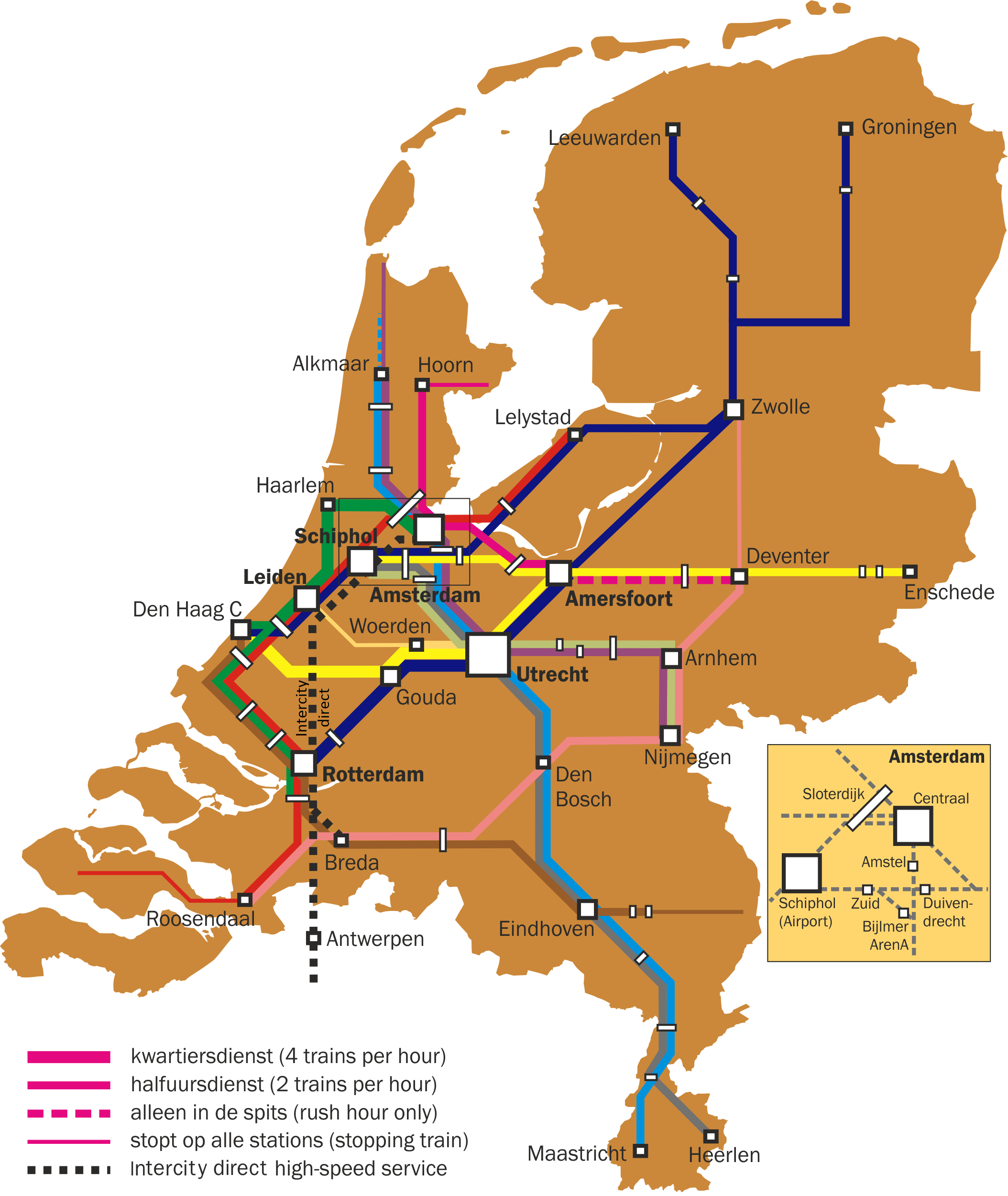
Dutch Intercity network

Intercity trains are very common in the Netherlands, but may differ from each other. While some intercity trains call only at larger stations, some others may also call at smaller stations or at all intermediate stations along a short stretch of its route. Hence, some stations may be served by one intercity train while another may pass it. For example, the Intercity trains between Arnhem Central station and Utrecht Central station alternately serve Driebergen-Zeist or Veenendaal-De Klomp (and both when the frequency is lowered from 4tph to 2tph in the evening). Often, intercity trains run as local trains along the very end of its route. For example, the Nijmegen to Den Helder intercity runs as regular intercity until Alkmaar, serving larger stations only, but running as local train between Alkmaar and Den Helder, serving all intermediate stations.

The average distance between station is shorter than most IC trains in most other countries, but frequencies are higher. All lines are served at least with 2tph, but many busy stretches are served have 4tph. From Utrecht Central there are even two different services to Amsterdam, one that serves the central station and two others and another that serves the south station and the airport. From December 2017 the frequency between Amsterdam, Utrecht and Eindhoven will be further increased to 6tph.

Rolling stock used mostly for intercity services in the Netherlands is VIRM. DD-AR trains have been converted to be used as New Intercity Double deckers and have been introduced to parts of the intercity network. Also, older ICM (formerly known as Koploper) EMUs are frequently seen on intercity routes. ICRm coaches, pulled by a TRAXX locomotive, can be seen on international stretches and the Intercity Direct.

=== Poland ===
InterCity Symbol in Poland

In Poland IC trains operated by PKP Intercity S.A. up to 2009 served the following routes:

- Warsaw–Katowice /Kraków with speed up to 200 km/h.
- Warsaw–Katowice–Bielsko-Biała with speed up to 160 km/h
- Warsaw–Katowice–Gliwice with speed up to 160 km/h
- Warsaw–Poznań–Wrocław with speed up to 160 km/h
- Warsaw–Katowice–Opole–Wrocław with speed up to 160 km/h
- Warsaw–Poznań–Szczecin with speed up to 160 km/h
- Warsaw–Gdańsk–Gdynia with speed up to 200 km/h
- Warsaw–Dęblin–Lublin with speed up to 160 km/h
- Gdynia–Warsaw–Kraków with speed up to 200 km/h
- Gdynia–Warsaw–Gliwice with speed up to 160 km/h
- Szczecin–Berlin–Amsterdam Zuid –Schiphol (jointly operated by PKP Intercity and Deutsche Bahn)

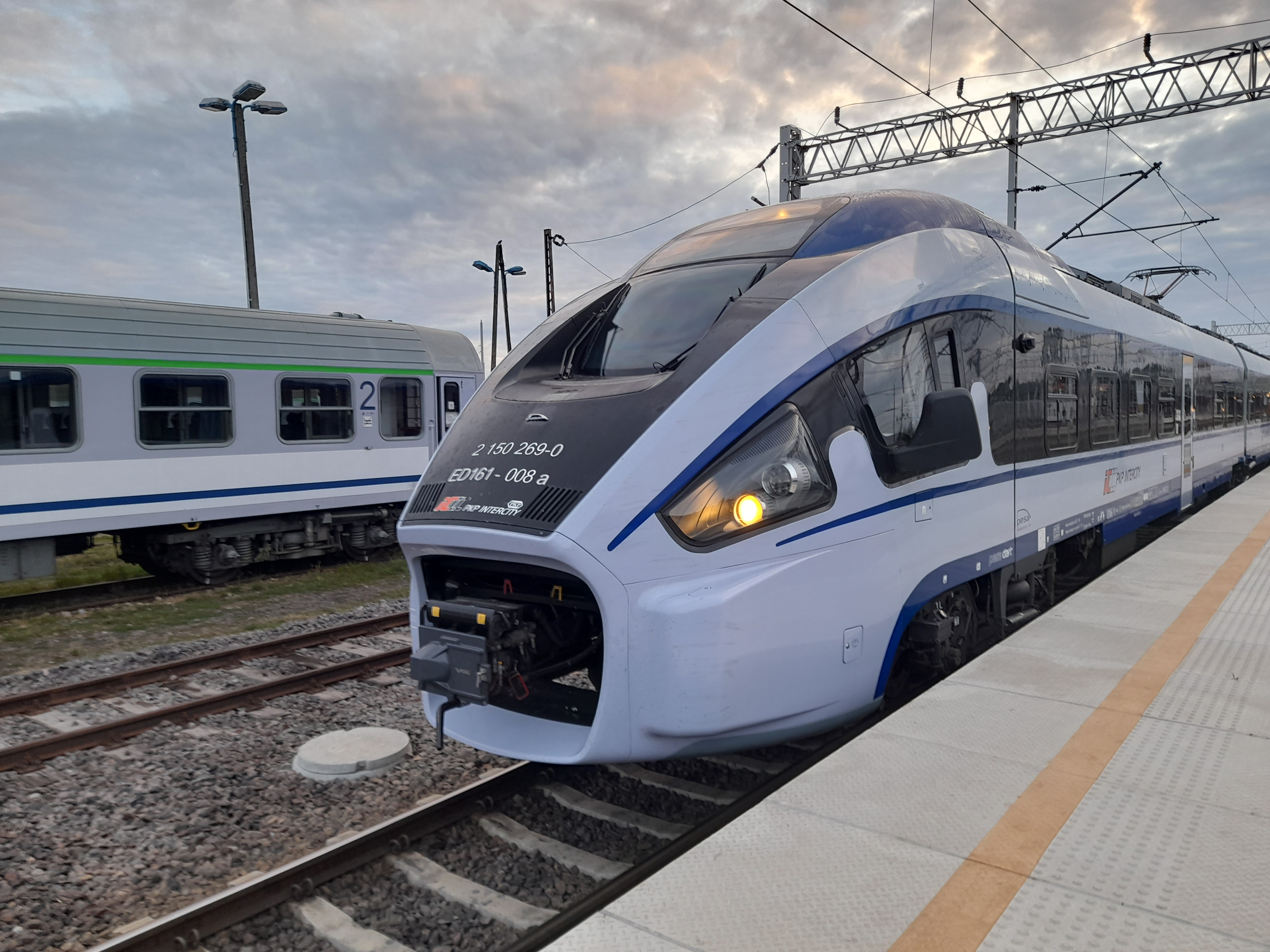
Express train under IC brand at Lublin Główny station in 2022 (ED161-008; Pesa Dart high-standard Polish made train).

Apart from a single railway line (line nr 4, a.k.a. Centralna Magistrala Kolejowa–Central Railway Route), average speeds are much lower.

These trains mostly use the locomotive named Eurosprinter (EU44), EP09, sometimes EP08.

In 2009 IC category was renamed Express InterCity (EIC). Since December 2014 IC trains are regular express and fast trains (with pricing offers like TLK fast trains), also operated by PKP Intercity, mainly utilizing high-standard Pesa Dart (ED161) and Stadler FLIRT^{3} (ED160) electric multiple units. In addition to the EMU trains are served with refurbished cars pulled by EU07, EP07, and EP08 locomotives.

=== Portugal ===
In Portugal, InterCidades trains are operated by state-owned Comboios de Portugal (CP).

All routes (except Casa Branca to Beja) are operated using a 5600 Series electric locomotives pulling Corail and Modernized Sorefame passenger cars, all capable of running at a maximum speed of 200 km/h. This services have a Bar car and bicycle space.

The Casa Branca to Beja Shuttle service is operated using two 0450 Series DMUs with airline style interiors at a maximum speed of 120 km/h. Although this service is branded as InterCidades, it is truly a stopper service (like a Regional service) with lower comfort standards and no Bar car or vending machines. This service is expected to have a quality boost when the new Stadler FLIRT BMU units enter operations sometime after 2025.

The InterCidades network can be divided into the following:

- InterCidades Norte: connects Lisbon with northern Portugal. It complements the Alfa Pendular services so that, in average, there is one train per hour between Lisbon and Porto. It has the following routes and frequencies:
  - Lisbon (Santa Apolónia) - Porto (Campanhã): 3 trains per day;
  - Lisbon (Santa Apolónia) - Porto (Campanhã) - Braga: 2 trains per day;
  - Lisbon (Santa Apolónia) - Porto (Campanhã) - Guimarães: 1 train per day;
  - Lisbon (Santa Apolónia) - Porto (Campanhã) - Viana do Castelo: 1 train per day - Saturday service terminates at Porto and Sunday service begins at Porto;
- Intercidades Beira Alta: connects Lisbon with Guarda via Coimbra and Mangualde through the Portuguese central highlands. It complements the InterCidades Norte services between Lisbon and Coimbra and has the following route and frequencies:
  - Lisbon (Santa Apolónia) - Coimbra - Guarda: 3 trains per day;
- Intercidades Beira Baixa: connects Lisbon with Covilhã via Abrantes and Castelo Branco following most of the Tagus valley before turning north towards the Portuguese central highlands. It complements the InterCidades Norte services between Lisbon and Entroncamento and has the following route and frequencies:
  - Lisbon (Santa Apolónia) - Entroncamento - Covilhã: 3 trains per day;
- InterCidades Alentejo: connects Lisbon with the Alentejo capitals of Évora and Beja through the Alentejo plains. It has the following route and frequencies:
  - Lisbon (Oriente) - Casa Branca - Évora: 4 trains per day on weekdays and 3 trains per day on weekends and holidays;
  - Casa Branca - Beja: 4 trains per day on weekdays and 3 trains per day on weekends and holidays;
- InterCidades Sul: connects Lisbon with Faro through the Alentejo plains and the Algarve Hills. It complements the two daily Porto - Faro Alfa Pendular services and has the following route and frequencies:
  - Lisbon (Oriente) - Faro: 3 trains per day with one extra summer Fridays service to Faro and one extra summer Sundays service to Lisbon.

Note: All frequencies listed above refer to round trips, so 1 train per day means 1 train per day each way.

=== Romania ===
Currently InterCity lines link the capital Bucharest to Brașov, Arad, Oradea, Cluj-Napoca, Târgu Mureș, Galați (all once daily), Suceava, Iași (twice daily), Piatra Neamț (once daily), Bacău (4x daily), Ploiești (6x daily), Craiova (twice daily) and Timișoara (once daily). There are also international trains branded as InterCity between the Hungarian capital, Budapest and some Transylvanian cities such as Cluj-Napoca, Târgu Mureș, Brașov, and others. These trains usually have specific names (Harghita, Ady Endre, etc.).

In the case of IC service running partially or totally on electrified lines as well as international IC-s locomotive-hauled trains are used. For some trains running exclusively on unelectrified lines (mainly in northern Transilvania) Siemens Desiro DMU-s are preferred. These trainsets look similar to standard Desiro DMU-s used for regional trains but have a different interior design with more comfortable seating.

All IC trains use 1st and 2nd class coaches with air conditioning, having automatic doors and a higher level of comfort than InterRegio trains. In order to compete with regional airlines, CFR Călători introduced special Business class coaches on the IC trains running between Oradea and Bucharest and Timișoara and Bucharest. The new class can be divided into two slightly different premium service levels, Business Exclusiv (1A) and Business Standard (1B). All of these coaches have wireless internet and wall sockets in order to permit the use of laptops, 4 channel audio system, bar, Exclusiv further providing larger space per customer, special leather seating and LCD screens for each seat.

The maximum speed on the Romanian Railways network is 160 km/h on the Bucharest - Constanța line, 140 km/h on the Bucharest - Ploiești line. The design speed for the rest of the network is either 120 km/h or 100 km/h.

In 2014, InterCity trains were replaced in their entirety by InterRegio trains, only to make an illegal comeback (train sets do not respect all the obligatory criteria for InterCity trains ironically signed by the same government a few months prior to their comeback) in 2022, with the new train timelist.

=== Serbia ===
From March 2022, state company called Srbija Voz operates InterCity route from Belgrade, the capital, to Novi Sad using 3 Stadler KISS EMUs reaching speeds up to 200 km/h, with journey length of 36 minutes. A massive expansion of IC routes is planned after the completion of Belgrade – Budapest and Belgrade – Niš high-speed lines.

=== Slovakia ===
In the Slovak Republic, InterCity trains run between the capital Bratislava and Košice (some IC trains continued from Bratislava to Vienna). In the past, the names of some of these trains used to be sold for commercial use (IC Šariš named by beer producer, IC Zelmer named by an electronic devices producer, IC Slovenka named by a magazine, IC Mora, IC Gorenje, both named after kitchen appliances producers). In 2012, no IC train had commercial name. All IC trains are named by natural monuments (IC Tatran, IC Kriváň, IC Gerlach, IC Rysy, IC Chopok, IC Ďumbier). All IC trains are subject to compulsory reservation to make comfort as high as possible. The seat reservation is included in the ticket price. The price varies, depending on the day of travel, and the time of reservation (the sooner you buy a ticket, the lower the price).

In the past, there were also 3 other InterCity services: IC 400/407 Donau (Danube) between Bratislava and Vienna, IC 532/533 Rákoczi from Košice to Budapest and IC 536/537 Hornád from Košice to Pécs. On this train passengers could travel without a reservation or surcharge, since it is impossible to use them for domestic transport in Slovakia.

All InterCity trains consist of new comfortable cars which are fully air conditioned.

First class and a restaurant car are available on all IC trains.

Maximum speed between Bratislava and Nové Mesto nad Váhom has been increased in the recent years and is now 160 km/h. On the rest of the route, maximum speed varies from 80 to 140 km/h. There is a large reconstruction under way between Nové Mesto nad Váhom and Žilina. After the reconstruction is finished, it will be possible to increase maximum speed of this part of the route to 160 km/h.

=== Slovenia ===
Intercity trains in Slovenia mainly serve domestic routes, like running from Ljubljana (capital) to Celje, Ptuj, and Maribor. Additionally, there are also available Pendolino electric multiple tilting units ETR 310 (SŽ series 310) labeled as ICS lines connecting Slovenian largest cities, Ljubljana and Maribor and the Mediterranean region of Slovenia, Koper.

=== Spain ===
Renfe operates intercity trains in Spain, as a long-distance, high frequency service. This denomination was first run in 1980. It started operating the electric train (EMU) Renfe 444 series, making the Madrid -Valencia vía Albacete line. It was capable of doing 140 km/h (87 mph).

In 1986 it expanded to Barcelona and Zaragoza, it was capable of doing 160 km/h (99 mph). In 1987 Renfe received new 448 series electric trains, also being capable of doing 160 km/h. On the main lines this service was combined with fast trains or Talgos. In the less-used lines it was a once-daily fast train. The last line was Irún-Madrid, operated by a 448 series. This service closed in 2008.

In 2012 Renfe opened new lines with the same designation, covering medium and long-distance routes.

The main differences between this line and the other ones is that it has more stops, trains stopping on some lines every 15 minutes or less. This service can be divided into 3 categories:
-New lines using old medium-distance tracks, but with more stops.
-Long-distance routes with intercity fares.
-Old MD (medium-distance) lines; some of them formed from combining two older MD lines.

=== Sweden ===
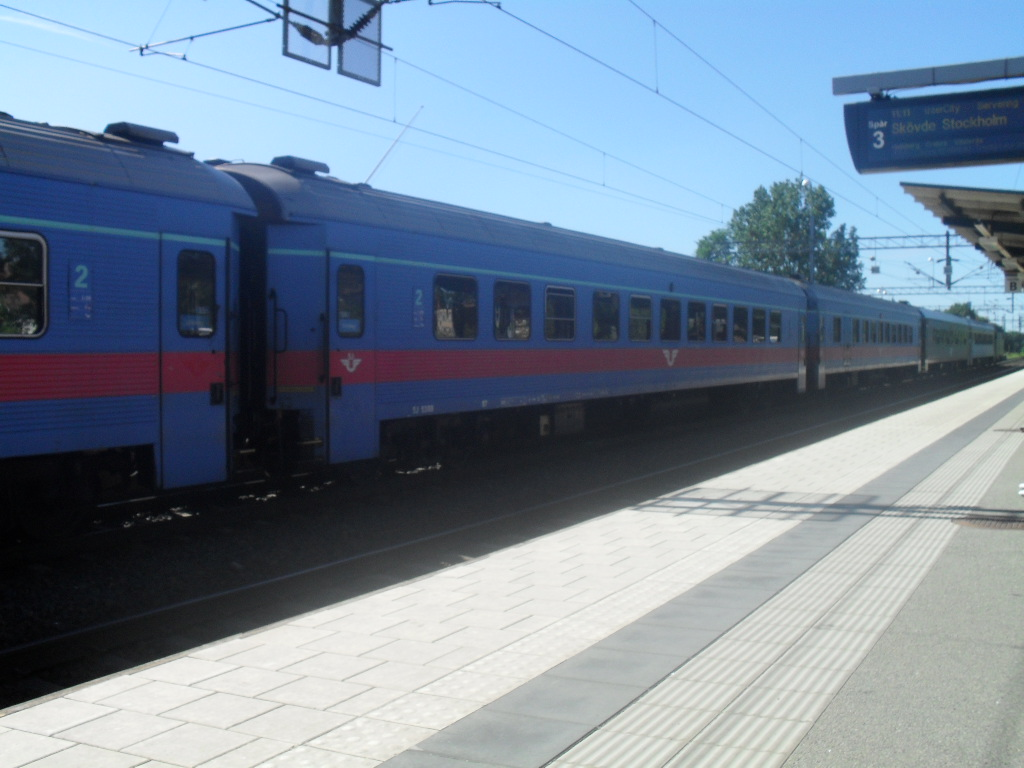
An InterCity train in Falköping, Sweden

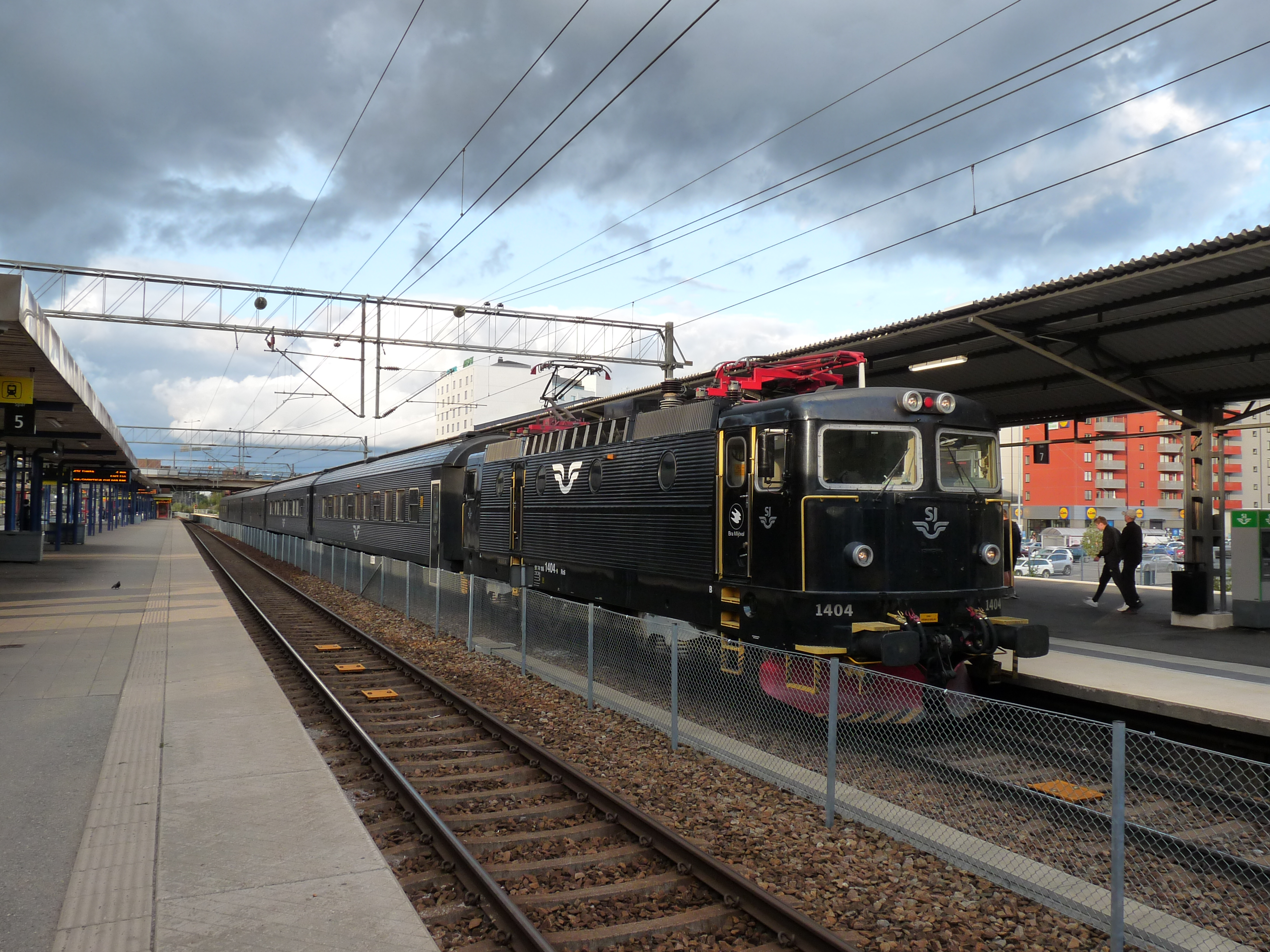
An InterCity train in Flemingsberg, Stockholm

During the 1980s, InterCity denoted trains of the highest standard in Sweden, serving as a fast and comfortable connection between major Swedish cities. Trains used to be set up of the most modern cars, always including a restaurant car. During the 1990s the Swedish State Railways introduced the new X 2000 units which replaced the InterCity trains in this role. In 2012 SJ started running services with Regina X55 trainsets under the name SJ 3000, which replaced InterCity trains on even more routes. InterCity trains now serve an auxiliary role, and are mainly used on lines where the track standard is too low to allow X 2000 and SJ 3000 trains to be utilised to their full potential, or on services which call at smaller stations with shorter distances in between them. InterCity trains are set up of modernised cars pulled by Rc6 locomotives with a maximum speed of 160 km/h. Some lines have services with both InterCity, SJ 3000 and X 2000 trains. As of July 2024 InterCity trains serve the following routes:

- Stockholm – Arlanda – Uppsala – Sala – Avesta – Hedemora – Säter – Borlänge – Falun. Some trains continue from Borlänge via Gagnef – Leksand – Rättvik to Mora;
- Stockholm – Arlanda – Uppsala – Gävle – Ljusdal – Ånge – Bräcke – Östersund – Åre – Duved. Some trains run along the East Coast Line and Central Line via Söderhamn – Hudiksvall – Sundsvall instead of the Northern Main Line between Gävle – Ljusdal – Ånge.
- Stockholm – Arlanda – Uppsala – Tierp – Gävle – Ockelbo – Bollnäs – Arbrå – Järvsö – Ljusdal
- Stockholm – Södertälje – Katrineholm – Hallsberg – Degerfors – Kristinehamn – Karlstad. Some trains continue from Karlstad via Arvika – Kongsvinger to Oslo.

Apart from the SJ, there are other train operators in Sweden who also run trains of a similar type. Only SJ, however, uses the name "InterCity". SJ also runs services with similar locomotive trains under the brand SJ Regional, mainly between Stockholm – Uppsala and Gothenburg – Kalmar, as well as night trains (SJ Nattåg) between Stockholm – Umeå, Gothenburg – Umeå, Stockholm – Östersund – Duved and Stockholm – Malmö. These are however not branded as InterCity services.

=== Switzerland ===
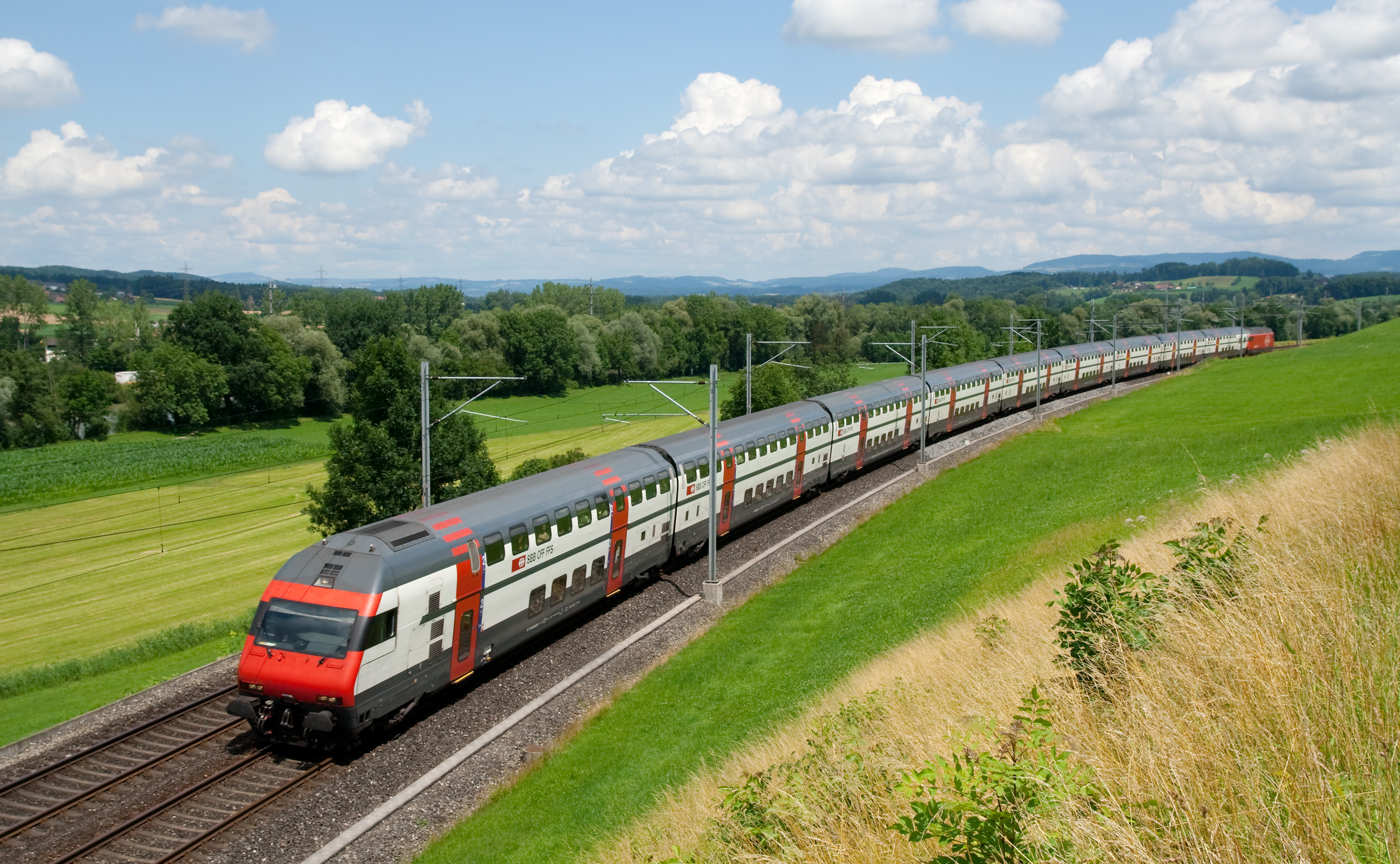
IC 2000 with the control car leading the train

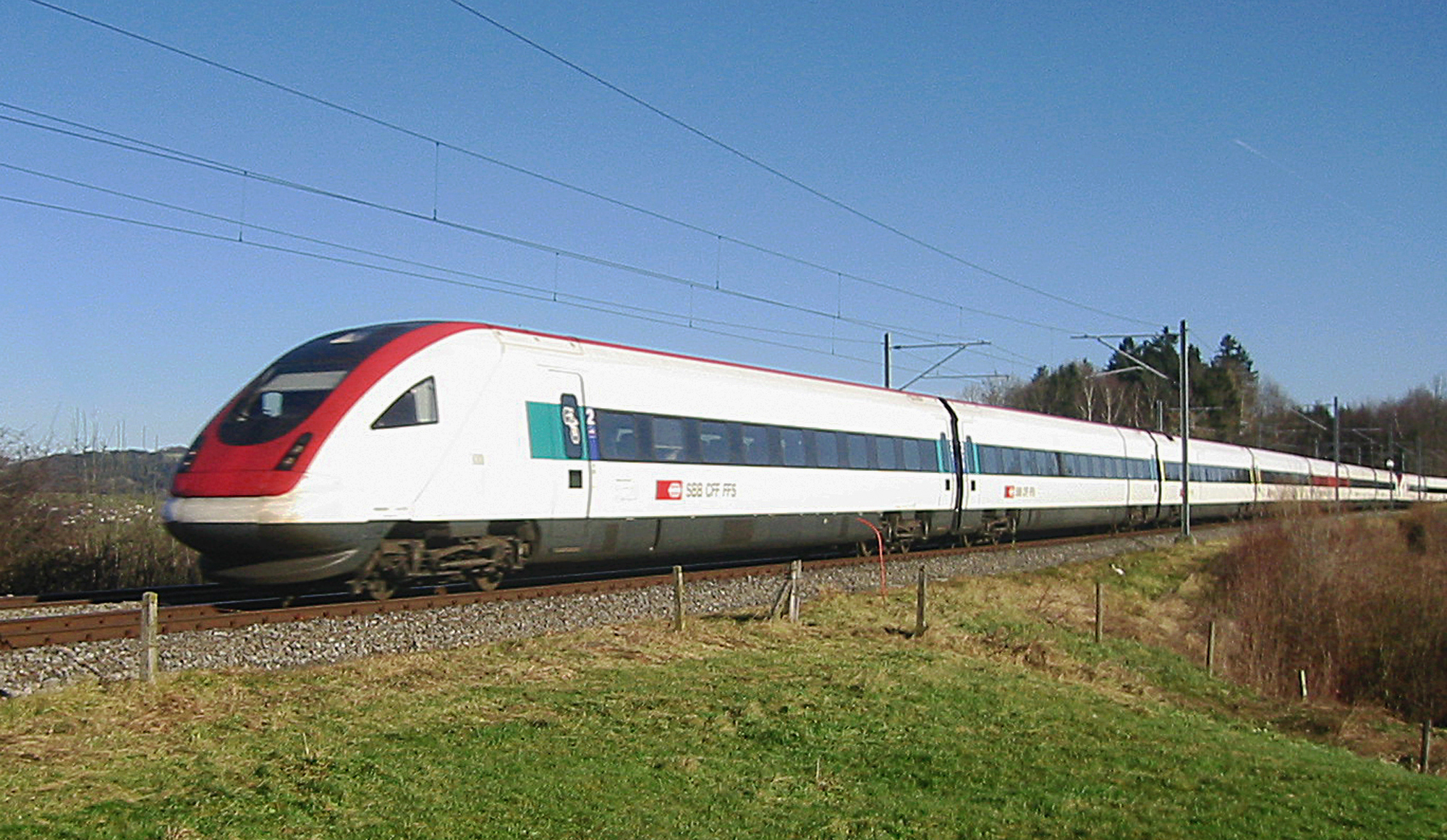
ICN train (SBB RABDe 500)

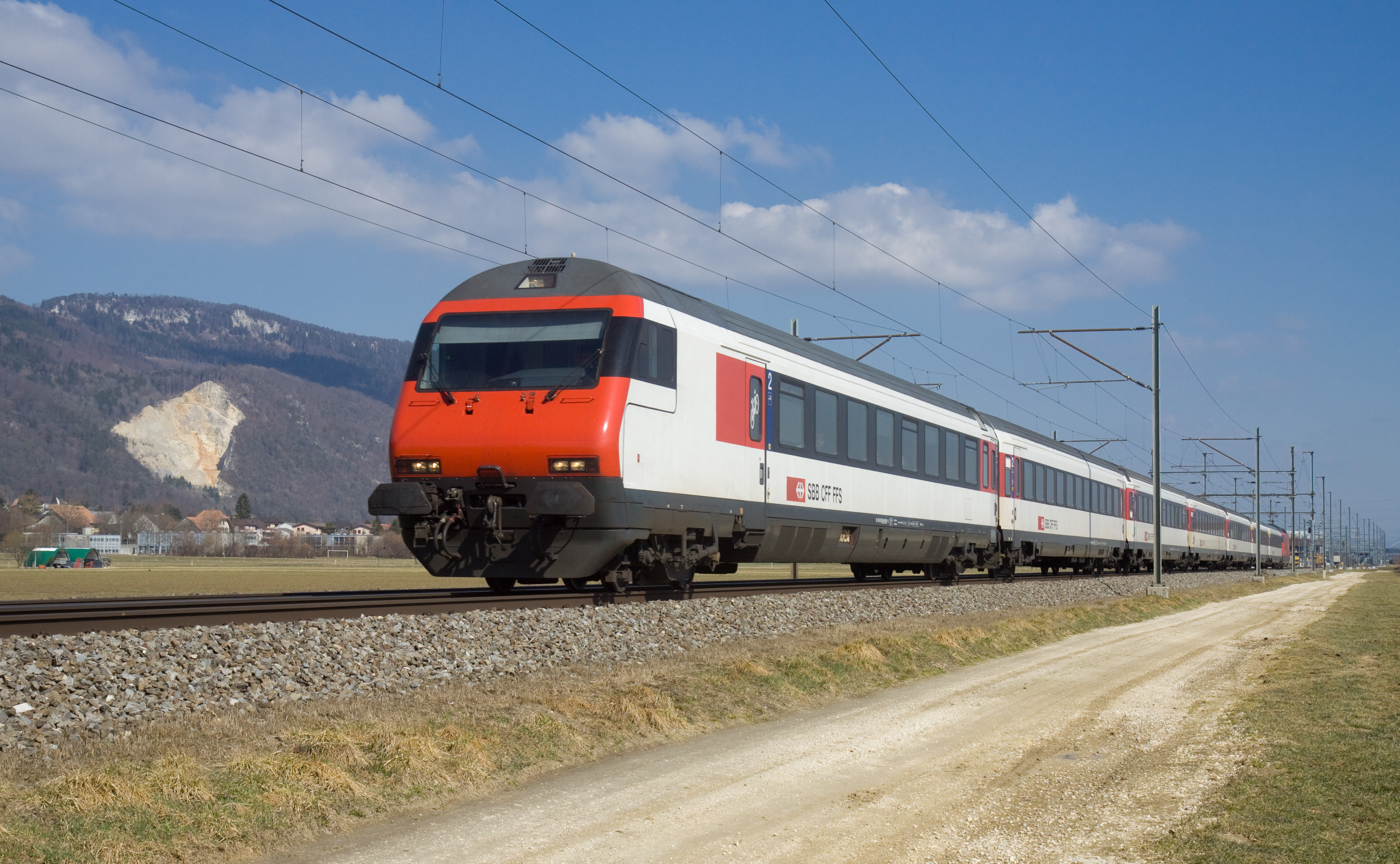
An InterCity train that consists of refurbished standard type IV carriages with the control car leading the train

Swiss InterCity services started in 1982, replacing the Swiss Express on the line Geneva-St. Gallen. There is no surcharge for InterCity services in Switzerland and the rolling stock consists of three types of formations:

- Standard type IV carriages (German: EW IV, Einheitswagen IV) and driving trailers of type IC, the same as on InterRegio services. A normal train composition consists of a Re 460 locomotive, 8 to 12 carriages and a driving trailer. Seating capacity is up to 900, depending on the train composition. Most carriages have a small compartment for storing bicycles and/or skis at one end of the carriage; this end is marked by a bicycle drawn on the outside of the closest doors. The type IV carriages are the least wheelchair friendly as they require climbing the stairs to enter. Overall, 533 carriages and driving trailers are in operation.
- Double-decker IC 2000 carriages for lines with heavy commuter load. These trains are also powered by a Re 460 locomotive, can be composed of up to 9 carriages with one driving trailer and offer close to 1,000 seats. At present, about 320 carriages are in use.
- A tilting train category called ICN for lines with many curves. These trains are electric multiple units and hence require no locomotive. One such multiple unit consists of 7 carriages and has a seating capacity of 480 passengers: 125 in first class, 332 in second class, and 23 in the dining car (which is part of second class). The fleet of ICN trains comprise 44 units.

If needed, two ICN trains can be combined to double the passenger capacity. In addition, several type IV carriages can be attached to an IC 2000 train set on the other side of the locomotive, especially if a group reservation requires extra carriages.

All carriages are air conditioned. Each train formation has first and second class carriages and, in most cases, a restaurant/bistro carriage. The availability of power sockets is constantly improved, sometimes even in second class. The maximal speed of all train types is 200 km/h, except for about half of type IV carriages that have not yet been upgraded and have a maximum speed of 160 km/h.

InterCity trains serve most of Swiss cities and provide direct connections from Zürich and Geneva airports. The InterCity routes within Switzerland according to 2009–2010 schedule include:

- Lugano – Bellinzona – Arth-Goldau – Luzern - Zug – Zürich HB;
- Interlaken Ost – Interlaken West – ( Därligen – Leissigen – Faulensee ) – Spiez – Thun – ( Münsingen ) – Bern – Olten – ( Liestal ) – Basel SBB;
- Brig – Visp – ( Frutigen ) – Spiez – Thun – Bern – ( Olten ) – Zürich HB – Zürich Flughafen – Winterthur – Frauenfeld – Weinfelden – ( Sulgen ) – Amriswil – Romanshorn;
- Brig – Visp – Spiez – Thun – Bern – Olten – Liestal – Basel SBB;
- Chur – Landquart – Sargans – ( Ziegelbrücke ) – Zürich HB – Basel SBB;
- Genève-Aéroport – Genève – ( Nyon – Morges ) – Lausanne – Fribourg – Bern – ( Olten – Aarau – Lenzburg ) – Zürich HB – Zürich Flughafen – Winterthur – Wil – Uzwil – Flawil – Gossau SG – St. Gallen;

as well as the following routes served by tilting ICNs:

- Bern – Zürich HB;
- Lausanne – ( Renens VD ) – Yverdon-les-Bains – Neuchâtel – Biel/Bienne – ( Grenchen Süd ) – Solothurn – ( Oensingen ) – Olten – Aarau – ( Lenzburg ) – Zürich HB – ( Zürich Oerlikon ) – Zürich Flughafen – Winterthur – Wil – ( Uzwil – Flawil ) – Gossau SG – St. Gallen;
- Lausanne – Yverdon-les-Bains – Neuchâtel – Biel/Bienne – Grenchen Nord – Moutier – Delémont – Laufen – Basel SBB;
- Genève-Aéroport – Genève – Nyon – Morges – Yverdon-les-Bains – Neuchâtel – Biel/Bienne – ( Grenchen Süd ) – Solothurn – Olten – Aarau – Zürich HB – Zürich Flughafen – Winterthur – Wil – ( Uzwil – Flawil ) – Gossau SG – St. Gallen;
- Genève-Aéroport – Genève – Nyon – Morges – Yverdon-les-Bains – Neuchâtel – Biel/Bienne – Grenchen Nord – Moutier – Delémont – Laufen – Basel SBB;
- Chur – Landquart – Sargans – Zürich HB – Basel SBB;
- Chiasso – Mendrisio – Lugano – Bellinzona – ( Flüelen – ) Arth-Goldau – Zug – Zürich HB;
- Chiasso – ( Mendrisio ) – Lugano – Bellinzona – Arth-Goldau – Luzern – Olten – Basel SBB.

=== Ukraine ===
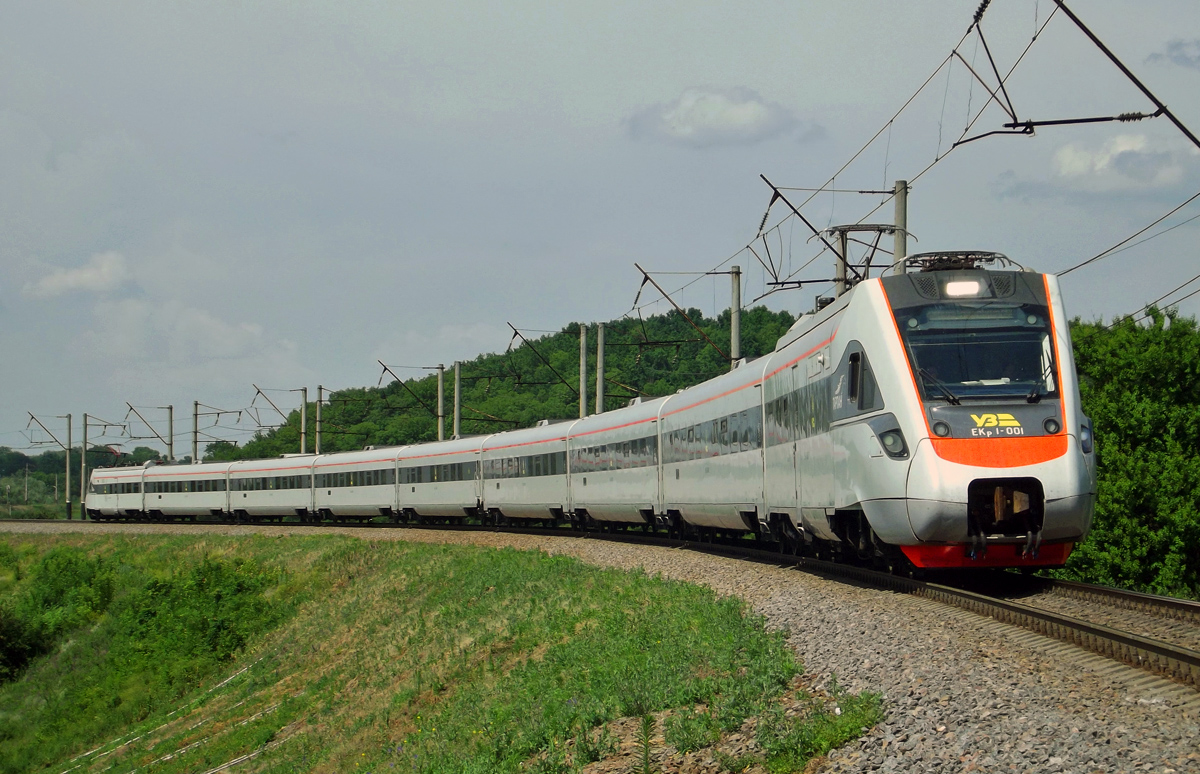
Ekr1-001 Tarpan train

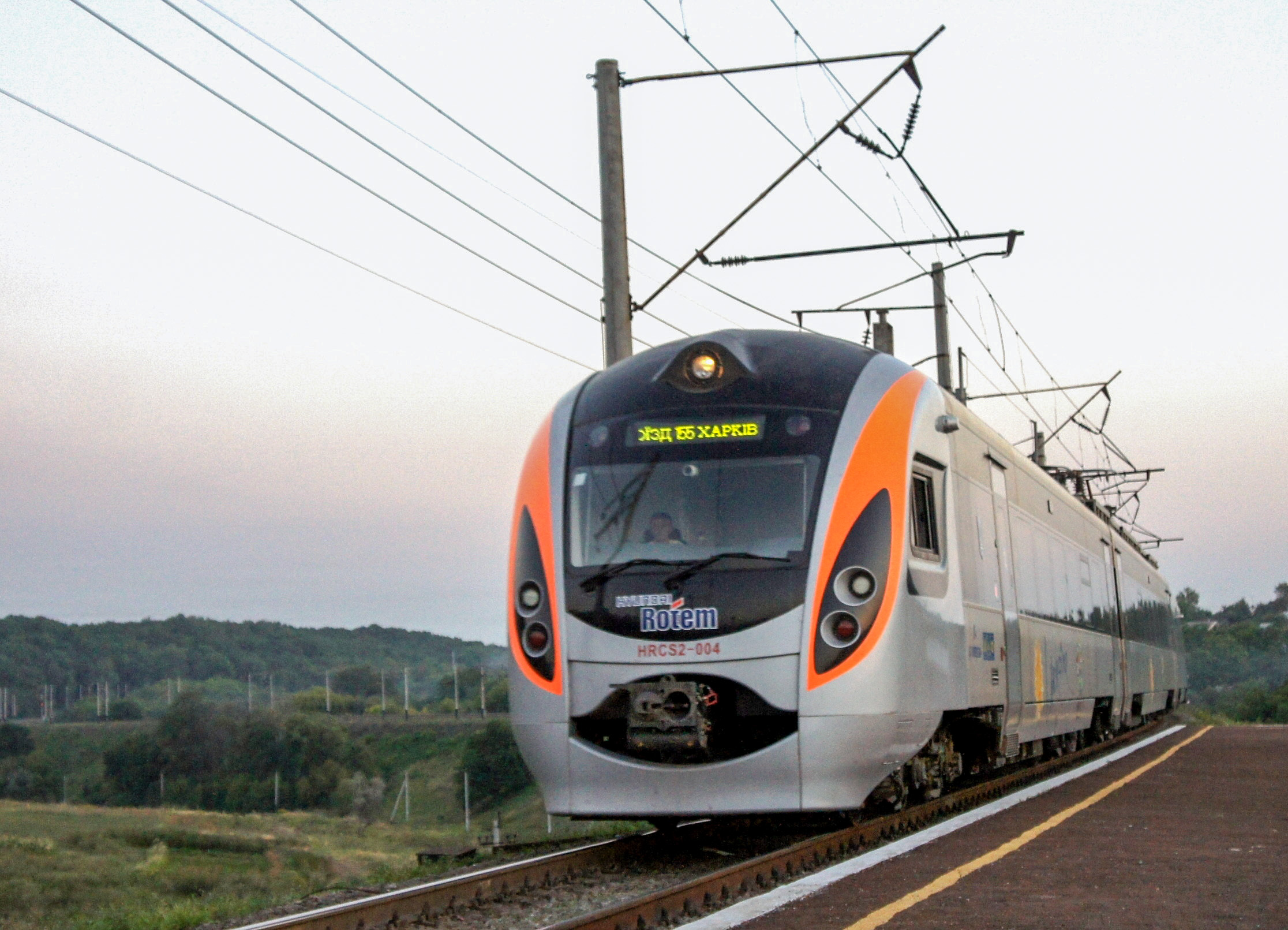
HRCS2 train

Intercity+ (max. 160 km/h) train services in Ukraine :

- Kyiv – Kharkiv
- Kyiv – Zaporizhzhia
- Kyiv – Dnipro
- Kyiv Darnytsia – Lviv – Przemysl
- Kyiv Darnytsia – Lviv – Truskavets
- Kyiv Darnytsia – Odesa

There were trains from Kharkiv and Dnipro to Crimea and from Kyiv to Donetsk. They were suspended in 2014, shortly after Ukraine have lost control of some of its territories. Currently, a shortened connection to Donbas is in service:

- Kyiv – Sloviansk – Kostiantynivka

These services are operated by Hyundai Rotem HRCS2, Škoda UZ class 675, KVBZ Ekr1 "Tarpan" trains, and KVBZ "Ukrajina" locomotive-hauled train .

Intercity (70 km/h – 90 km/h) train services in Ukraine :

- Kyiv Darnytsia – Lviv
- Kyiv – Kryvyi Rih
- Kharkiv – Kyiv – Vinnytsia
- Kharkiv – Donetsk (Suspended in 2014)
- Dnipro – Donetsk (Suspended in 2014)

Intercity and Intercity+ trains are operated by Ukrainian Rapid Railway Company (a branch of Ukrzaliznytsia).

=== United Kingdom ===
InterCity logo of the British Rail, 1987–1994 known as the 'swallow' logo

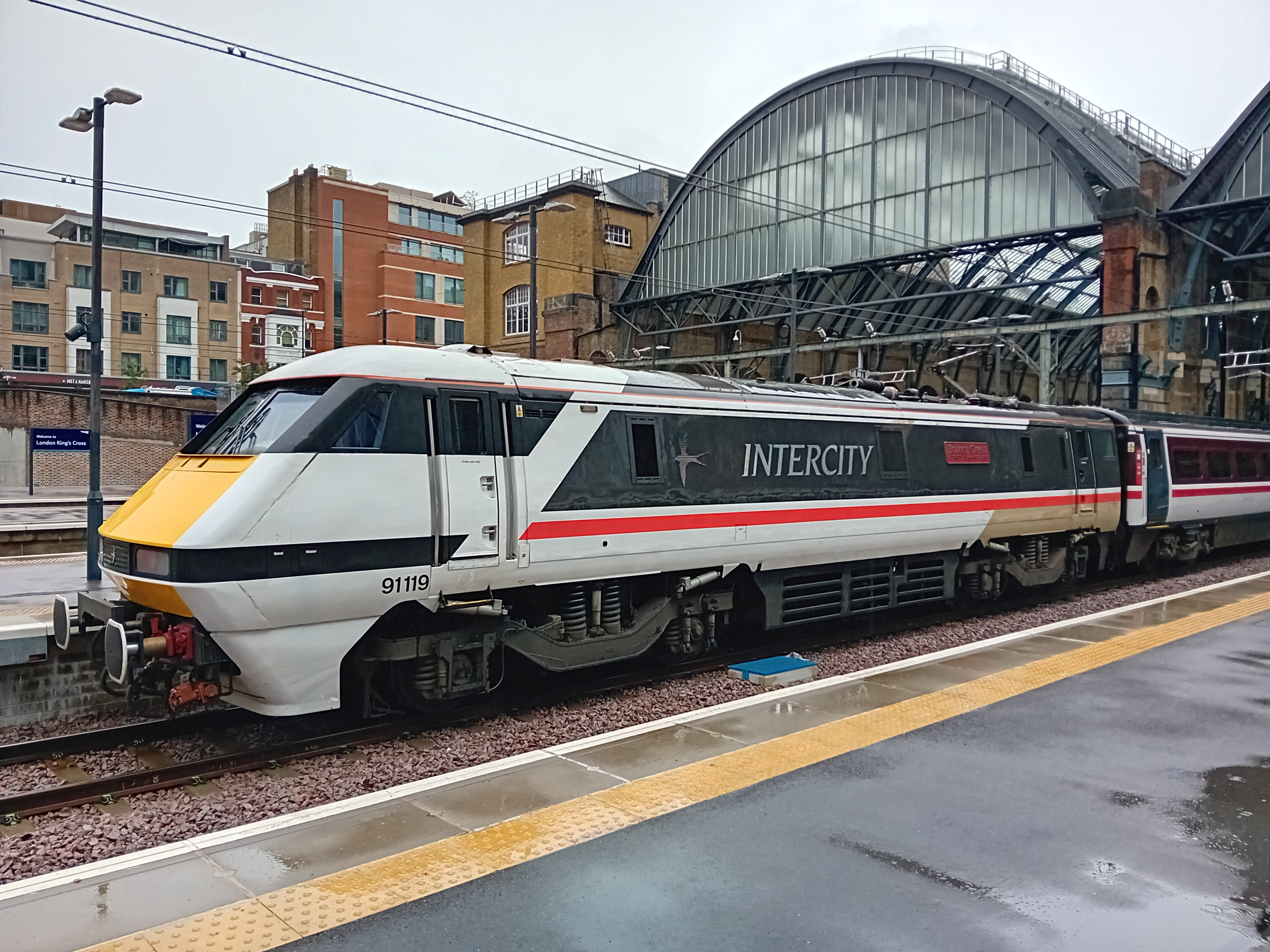
Class 91 in Intercity Swallow livery at London King's Cross

The term "Inter-City" was first used by the state railway company British Rail in 1966, to brand all its longer-distance, higher-speed services (the hyphen was dropped shortly afterwards, changing the name to "InterCity"). The brand was closely associated with a new design of carriage, the Mark 2 which revolutionised levels of comfort on the system. The system was hugely successful and became one of the world's few profitable public railway services.

Today, Britain's railways having been privatised, InterCity trains in the UK are operated by many different train companies including Greater Anglia, Avanti West Coast, CrossCountry, Great Western Railway, London North Eastern Railway, East Midlands Railway, Hull Trains, Lumo, Transport for Wales, ScotRail, TransPennine Express, Caledonian Sleeper, Grand Central and Eurostar. Most of these companies operate their services from one of the many London termini, with CrossCountry being the main exception, running from Cornwall to Scotland. If travelling via London it is often necessary to change stations: a journey from Norwich to Cardiff would require a transfer from London Liverpool Street to London Paddington station via the Elizabeth line.

Currently, InterCity trains in United Kingdom mainly use Hitachi AT300 in the form of Class 800, Class 801, Class 802, Class 803, Class 805, Class 807 and Class 810. Other InterCity trains include the InterCity 125 (Class 43 power car + 4/5/8 Mark 3 coaches, also named as HST), InterCity 225 (Class 91 + 9 Mark 4 coaches), Class 90 + 8/9 Mark 3 coaches + Driving Van Trailer, Voyager family classes 220, 221 & 222 (4–7 coach DEMUs), class 180 (5 coach DMUs), Class 745, and class 390 (9 or 11 coach EMUs) on the Intercity lines.

The British Government have named their project to replace the InterCity 125 as well as InterCity 225 as the Intercity Express Programme. The resultant bidding process was won by Hitachi and Angel Trains and resulted in the Hitachi Super Express Trains being introduced, which Hitachi later designated the AT300.

== See also ==
- Train categories in Europe
