= HŽ Infrastruktura =

Croatian state-owned railway infrastructure manager

HŽ Infrastruktura d.o.o.
- Type: State-owned
- Industry: Railway infrastructure manager
- Predecessor: Croatian Railways
- Founded: 20 July 2006
- Headquarters: Ulica Antuna Mihanovića 12, Zagreb, Croatia
- Area served: Croatia
- Key people: Damir Lončarić (chair); Darko Barišić; Marijan Ćužić; Subhi Tawfiq
- Revenue: ▲€226.24 million
- Net income: ▼€138,000
- Owner: Republic of Croatia
- Number of employees: 5248
- Website: eng.hzinfra.hr

HŽ Infrastruktura (lit. 'Croatian Railways Infrastructure', HŽI) is a Croatian state-owned railway infrastructure manager. It was created on 20 July 2006 after the split of Croatian Railways into three companies: HŽPP (passenger transport), HŽ Infrastruktura, and HŽ Cargo (freight transport); this was done in order to comply with EU directive 91/440 as part of Croatia's accession process into the European Union. While the rail tracks are owned by the government, HŽ Infrastruktura manages, maintains, and invests in railway infrastructure, which includes signaling, crossings and stations. It employs 5,248 people, and is managed by a four-person management board.

HŽ Infrastruktura manages 1,503.936 km (934.503 mi) of rail tracks. Of that, 44.4% is electrified and 55.6% is non-electrified.
