= HŽ Cargo =

Croatian state-owned freight transport company

HŽ Cargo d.o.o.
- Type: State-owned
- Industry: Rail transport
- Predecessor: Croatian Railways
- Founded: 20 July 2006
- Headquarters: Heinzelova ulica 51, Zagreb, Croatia
- Area served: Croatia
- Key people: Dragan Marčinko (CEO)
- Revenue: ▲€87.4 million (2023)
- Net income: ▲€2 million (2023)
- Owner: Republic of Croatia
- Number of employees: 932
- Website: www.hzcargo.hr/en

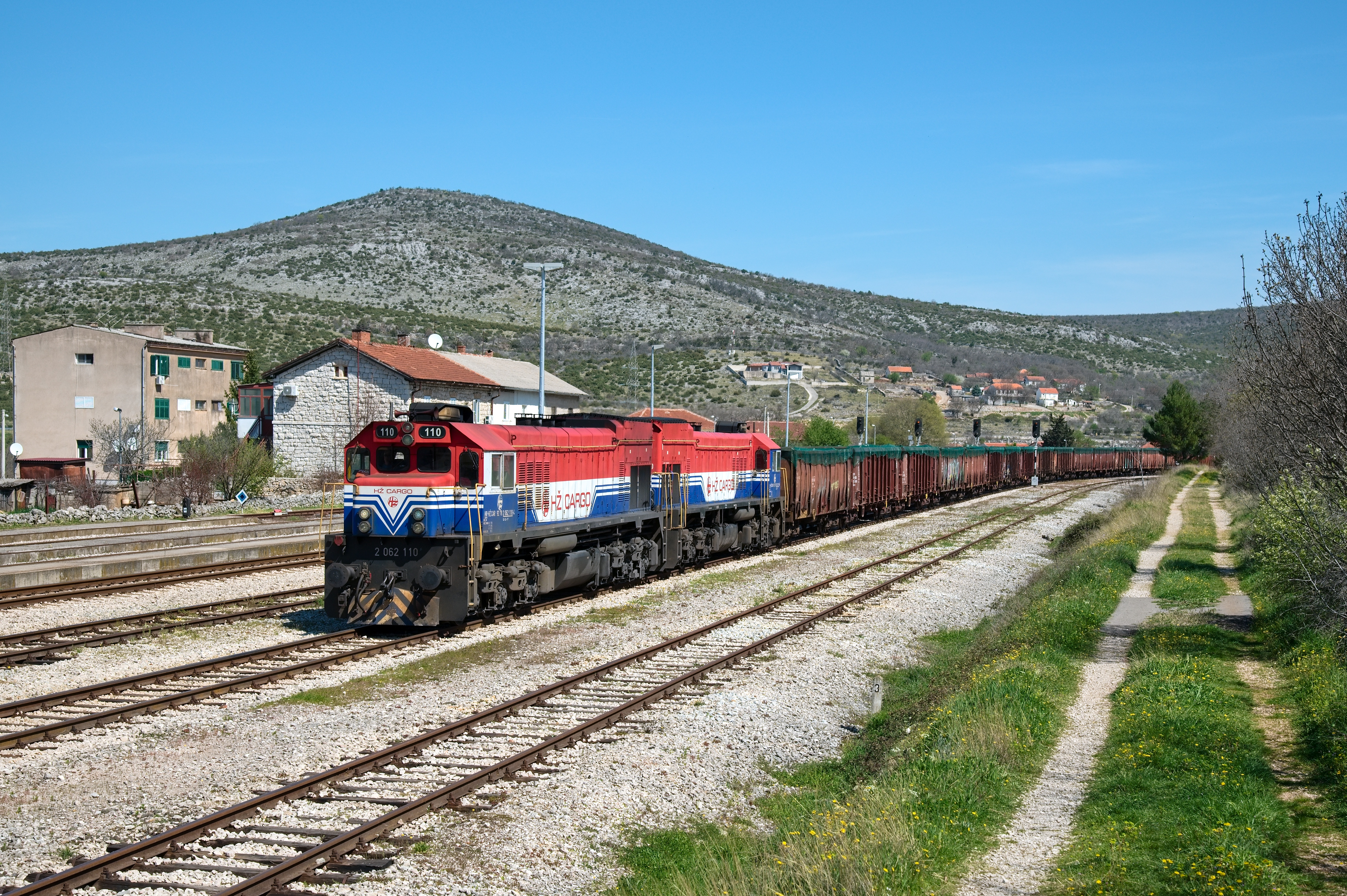
HŽ Cargo freight train arriving to Perković railway station, Croatia

HŽ Cargo (lit. 'Croatian Railways Cargo') is a Croatian state-owned freight transport company. It was formed on 20 July 2006 from the Croatian Railways' cargo branch in order to comply with EU directive 91/440, as part of Croatia's accession process to join the European Union, and began operations on 1 January 2007. Its current CEO is Dragan Marčinko. The management also includes the supervisory board, the audit board and the Minister of Sea, Transport and Infrastructure Oleg Butković.

Ever since the market was liberated in 2013 and private cargo companies were allowed on Croatian tracks, HŽ Cargo has lost market share. In 2023, the Government of Croatia began a process to sell the company.

In 2013 Grup Feroviar Român purchased a 75% shareholding in the business.

== See also ==
- HŽ Putnički prijevoz
- HŽ Infrastruktura
