= Croatian Railways =

Croatian national railway company (1990–2006)

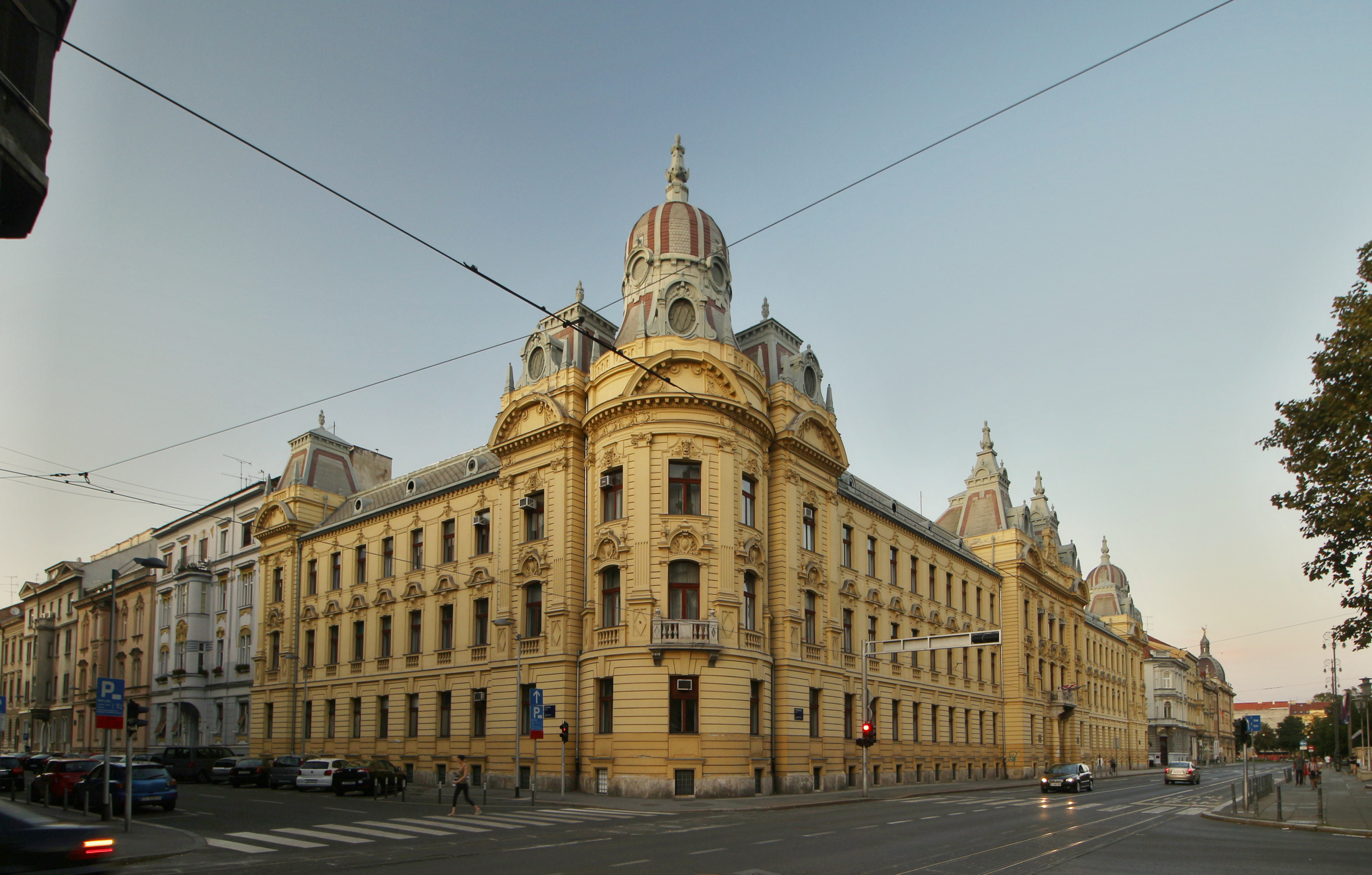
- Former Croatian Railways headquarters in Zagreb
- Trade name: Hrvatske željeznice; HŽ
- Company type: State-owned
- Industry: Rail transport, infrastructure management
- Predecessor: Yugoslav Railways
- Founded: 1990
- Defunct: 2006
- Successor: HŽ Putnički prijevoz HŽ Infrastruktura; HŽ Cargo; HŽ Vuča vlakova HŽ Holding
- Headquarters: Mihanovićeva ulica 12, Zagreb, Croatia
- Products: Rail Transport, Rail Construction, Services
- Owner: Republic of Croatia

Croatian Railways (Croatian: Hrvatske željeznice, HŽ) was the national railway company of Croatia from 1990 to 2006.

In 2006, it was split into five new companies: HŽ Putnički prijevoz (passenger transport), HŽ Infrastruktura (infrastructure manager), HŽ Cargo (freight transport), HŽ Vuča vlakova and HŽ Holding (to temporarily manage the newly formed companies).

== History ==
Croatian Railways was founded in 1990 from the former Yugoslav Railways (JŽ) Zagreb Division, following Croatia's secession from Yugoslavia. Its vehicle fleet was initially the one it inherited at the time of the breakup of Yugoslavia, which was then modernized over time.

The company ceased to exist in 2006 and its assets were taken over by the newly founded company Hrvatske Željeznice Holding d.o.o. The operation was then provided by the holding's four subsidiaries:

- HŽ Infrastruktura d.o.o. (infrastructure manager)
- HŽ Putnički prijevoz d.o.o. (passenger transport)
- HŽ Cargo d.o.o. (freight transport)
- HŽ Vuča vlakova d.o.o. (train towing)

In accordance with EU Directive 91/440 requiring EU member states to separate "the management of railway operation and infrastructure from the provision of railway transport services", on 1 November 2012 HŽ Holding ceased to exist, with the three operational companies becoming completely independent: HŽ Putnički prijevoz, HŽ Infrastruktura, and HŽ Cargo. HŽ Vuča vlakova was incorporated into HŽ Cargo the same day.

Croatian Railways' International Union of Railways (UIC) membership was transferred to all three successors. The UIC Country Code for Croatia is 78.

== See also ==
- Rolling stock of the Croatian Railways
- Rail transport in Croatia
