= HŽ Passenger Transport =

Croatian state-owned passenger transport company

HŽ Putnički prijevoz d.o.o.
- Type: State-owned
- Industry: Rail transport
- Predecessor: Croatian Railways
- Founded: 20 July 2006
- Headquarters: Strojarska cesta 11, Zagreb, Croatia
- Area served: Croatia
- Key people: Željko Ukić (chair); Damir Rubčić; Mario Zubak
- Revenue: ▼€159.51 million (2024)
- Net income: ▲€4.31 million (2024)
- Owner: Republic of Croatia
- Number of employees: 1667 (2023)
- Website: www.hzpp.hr/en

HŽ Passenger Transport (Croatian: HŽ Putnički prijevoz, HŽPP) is a Croatian state-owned passenger transport company established on 20 July 2006 after a split from Croatian Railways, in order to comply with EU directive 91/440 as part of Croatia's accession into the European Union. HŽPP is responsible for transporting passengers and trains maintenance and renting. It owns Tehnički servisi željezničkih vozila d.o.o. (meaning "Technical services of railway vehicles"), a subsidiary that maintains the vehicles. Its management is split into the management board, revision board, and the supervisory board.

As of 2023, HŽPP owned 57 locomotives, 72 diesel trains and 64 electric trains. The Croatian rail network carried 26.4 million passengers in 2025.

An HZPP train spotted at Split's train station. It is an EMU vehicle that uses diesel.

== See also ==
- HŽ Infrastruktura
- HŽ Cargo
- Rolling stock of the Croatian Railways
