= Rolling stock of the Croatian Railways =

This is a list of past and present rolling stock owned and operated by HŽ Putnički prijevoz (HŽPP), the successor of Croatian Railways' passenger transport division, consisting of diesel locomotives, electric locomotives, diesel multiple units, electric multiple units and railroad cars. When the company began operation in 1991, it was with a collection of equipment inherited from "ŽTP Zagreb" – a Croatian division of Yugoslav Railways. Much of this equipment was later refurbished/modernized and remains in use today. Over the years, HŽPP has supplemented this initial fleet with new orders and with new acquisitions of secondhand equipment from other operators.

== Diesel locomotives ==
Designation	Build year	Total units	Producer	AAR wheel arrangement	Power output	Image
HŽ 2041	1962–65	10	Brissoneau et Lotz / Đuro Đaković	Bo'Bo'	606 kW	
HŽ 2044	1981	15	EMD-GM / Đuro Đaković	(A1A)'(A1A)'	1,826 kW	
HŽ 2062	1972–73	18	EMD-GM / Đuro Đaković	Co'Co'	1,640 kW	
HŽ 2063	1972	2	EMD-GM	Co'Co'	2,461 kW	
HŽ 2132	1959–63, 1965–78	102	Jenbach / Đuro Đaković / TŽV Gredelj	C	397 kW	

== Electric locomotives ==
Currently in service with the National rail operator there are 46 HŽ 1141 and 15 HŽ 1142 Domestically produced Locomotives, all of which will undergo modernization and upgrade under contract signed with the Končar company last year. HŽ is leasing further 9 HŽ 1141 locomotives to third parties. Of the total 46 HŽ 1141 locomotives currently active, 17 locomotives are used pulling passenger coaches and 29 are used in HŽ Cargo, however 3 HŽ 1141 locomotives were damaged in recent rail accidents and are out of service due to extensive repairs. Eventually all HŽ 1141 locomotives currently in service under HŽPP will be transferred and solely used by HŽ Cargo, leaving HŽ 1142 as sole locomotive with HŽ Putnički Promet. Further five Vectron X4 A17 locomotives are also in service with HŽ Cargo.

Designation	Build year	Total units	Producer	AAR wheel arrangement	Power output	Image
HŽ 1141	1968–72, 1981–85, 1987, 2002–03, 2008–18	46	ASEA / Končar	Bo'Bo'	3,860 kW	
HŽ 1142	1981–1988	15	Končar	Bo'Bo'	4,400 kW	
Vectron X4 A17	2017	5	Siemens Mobility	Bo'Bo'	5,600 kW	

== DMUs ==
Currently with Hrvatske Zeljeznice there are 75 Diesel Multiple Units. There are currently twelve modern 7023 series of DMUs in service with the HZ. Additionally, National rail operator purchased 11 additional intercity trains, to be used on Zagreb - Split route. Current HŽ 7123 lacks the capacity for the route which in summer months is very popular with the tourist. However, as the line between Ogulin - Split isn't electrified, currently only Diesel powered trains or DMUs can operate the route. Croatian train manufacturer Koncar was given the contract for all 6+5 ICT trains which should be delivered in 2026 and 2027. Additional 8 regional Electric-battery units will be purchased for routes in Istria and Dalmatia according to the statement issued by the Croatian Government.

Designation	Build year	Total units	Producer	AAR wheel arrangement	Power output	Image
HŽ 7022	2012	1	TŽV Gredelj	Bo'2'+2'Bo'+2Bo'	1,390 kW	Gredelj DMU
HŽ 7023	2015–2025	12	Končar, Croatia	Bo’2’2’Bo’	N/A	
HŽ 7121	1980–86	31	Đuro Đaković	Bo'Bo' + 2'2'	2x210 kW	
HŽ 7122	1980–1981	25	FIAT / KALMAR	(1A)"(1A)"	2x147 kW	
HŽ 7123	2004	6	Bombardier Transportation	2'B' 2'B'	2x560 kW	

== EMUs ==
Currently national operator utilizes two EMU types, Hungarian built Ganz EMUs which were purchased in late 70s and Koncar built EMUs that came in to service from 2011. Plan is to replace all Ganz made EMUs by late 2027 with Koncar built units. 12 brand new EMUs are on order and should be delivered by late 2025. Eventually Hrvatske Zeljeznice hopes top operate around ~84 EMUs built by Koncar.

Designation	Build year	Total units	Producer	AAR wheel arrangement	Power output	Image
HŽ 6111	1976–79	21	Ganz Mávag	2'2'+Bo'Bo'+2'2'	1,200 kW	
HŽ 6112	2011–2024	55	Končar	Bo'2'2'2'Bo	2,000 kW	

== Battery electric multiple unit ==
National Rail operator Hrvatske Zeljeznice signed a contract for 2 Battery electric multiple unit train sets in contract valued at €17.1 million. National rail operator HŽ Putnički prijevoz (HŽPP) hopes to secure an order of additional 60 brand new battery electric multiple units by 2030, replacing all but 20 DMUs that entered service in past decade, namely, HŽ 7022, HŽ 7023 and HŽ 7123 series. National rail operator will install required battery storage/charging facilities at main railway stations that are currently not connected to electrified rail network. Stations include, Split, Osijek, Varaždin, Bjelovar, Virovitica, Gospić and Pula. 8 Additional Elecxtric/Batery train sets will be purchased on top of 2 already ordered scheduled to enter service in 2026. However longer term, by 2060, Croatian Government indicates they'll secure funding for up to 60 further Battery electric train sets for total of 70 or so BEMUs in service with the HZ ideally by the end of this decade. If all current and planned new train purchases are fulfilled by 2030, HŽPP will operate a fleet of 55 EMUs, 25 modern DMUs and at least 60 BEMUs, in total some 140 modern train sets.

Designation	Build year	Total units	Producer	AAR wheel arrangement	Power output	Image
TBA	TBA	2+8 on order	Končar, Croatia	Bo'2'2'2'Bo	2,000 kW	

== Passenger railroad cars ==
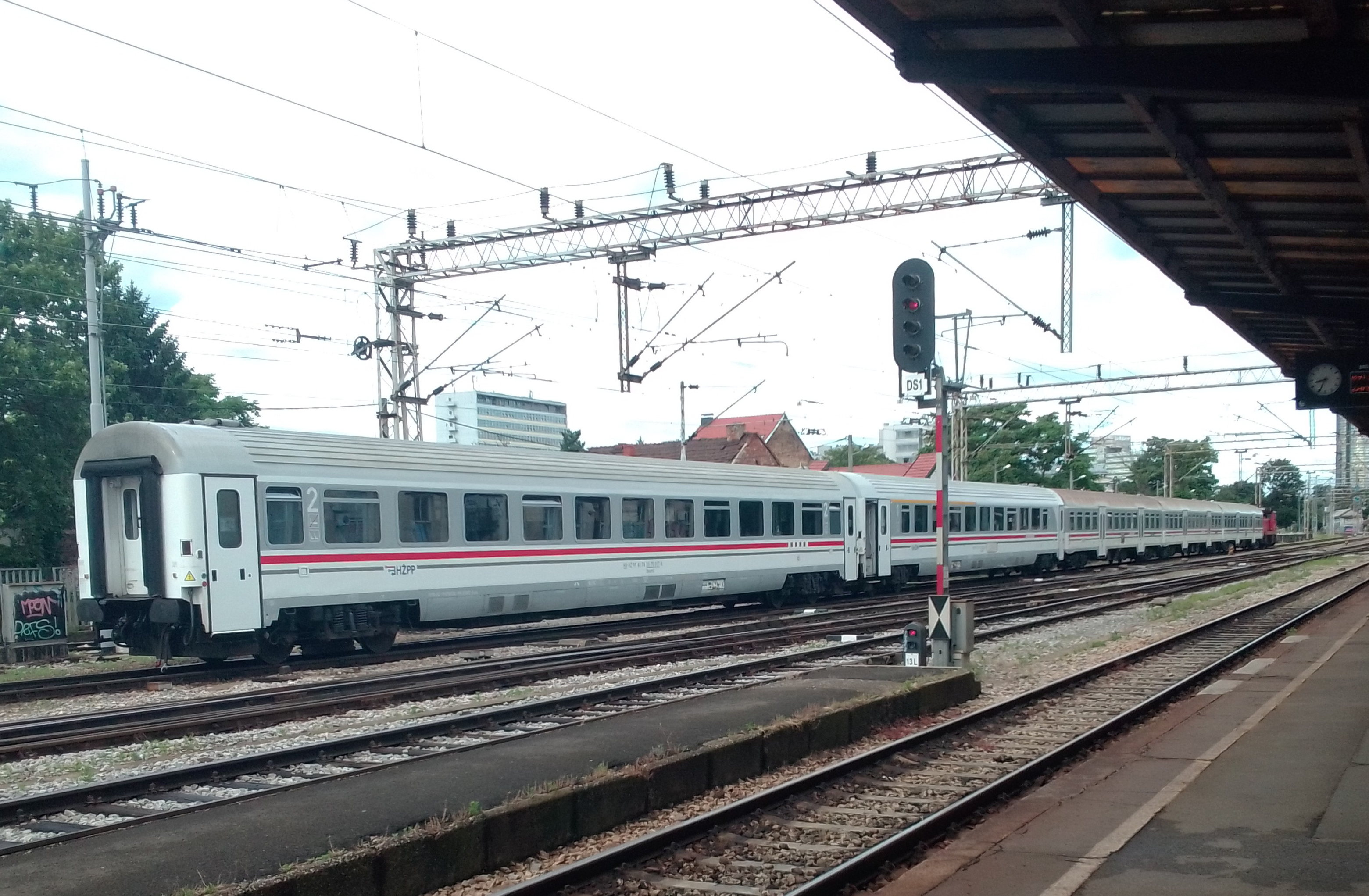
Shunting of railroad cars at Zagreb Central Station (2022)

Passenger railroad cars currently owned by HŽPP follow the general Eurofima coach design. Majority of them were manufactured in the factory Goša FOM between the 1970s and 1990s, and in 1991 they were inherited from Yugoslav Railways (division “ŽTP Zagreb”).

Mainly during the 2000s, all railroad cars of the rolling stock were modernized in TŽV Gredelj to cope with demands of quality service in modern times. During the modernization, the cars intended for the transport of passengers in trains of the highest rank (including 1st and 2nd class cars, dining car and sleeping cars) received air conditioning, a completely new interior and exterior, installation of a closed vacuum toilet system, installation of doors with automatic control, etc. During the first years of company's existence and later, especially after the appearance of the first newly reconstructed cars in 2003, there was a surplus of first-class cars in the fleet, and for that reason, a large number of originally first-class cars were gradually transformed into lower-class cars. On later reconstructions, these cars only underwent some minor modifications (exterior painting in the new colour scheme, replacement of the seats and interior wall panels, etc.) and were gradually phased out of traffic during the 2010s and 2020s.

HŽ Putnički prijevoz also has cars jointly produced by the factories "Janko Gredelj" and "Boris Kidrič" in the mid-1980s, that were reconstructed and modernized in TŽV Gredelj between 2011 and 2012. Cars received air-conditioning, new side doors with automatic control, complete new interior, closed vacuum toilet system, etc.

=== Car types ===
Although each car of the fleet has its own numerical ID, the type of the car is additionally recognized by the letter designation, which is a combination of capital and lowercase letters in the name of the car. The letter mark of the car, together with the numerical mark, is located on the sides of each car.

Capital letters in the letter mark of the car:

A – first class car

B – second class car

AB – first and second class car

WL – sleeping car

WR – dining (restaurant) car

Lowercase letters in the letter mark of the car:

aa – car with two axles (withdrawn from active rolling stock)

c – couchette car

ee – car with electricity supply exclusively through the passing electric line

t – car with seats and a passage in the middle (opposite to corridor car)

l – car with an audio system

m – car longer than 24,50 meters (80.3 feet)

=== List of active railroad cars ===
Below is the list of active railroad cars in the rolling stock of HŽ Putnički prijevoz according to their types and characteristics as of May 2022:

Letter mark of the car	Built	Reconstructed	In service	Notes
Aeelt	1976–1983	2003	11	First class-only air-conditioned car for international and domestic traffic with seats and a passage in the middle; original car type: A, B, AB
Bee	1976–1984	2004–2009	43	Second class-only air-conditioned corridor car for international and domestic traffic; original car type: A, B, AB
Beemt	1991	2009–2010	7	Second class-only air-conditioned car with seats and a passage in the middle, for international and domestic traffic; original car type: Aeelmt
ABee	1984	2008	5	First and second class air-conditioned corridor car for international and domestic traffic; original car type: AB, B
ABeemt	1991	2009– 2010	4	First and second class air-conditioned car with seats and a passage in the middle, for international and domestic traffic; original car type: Aeelmt
Beelt	1976–1977	1997–2002	3	Second class-only air-conditioned car with seats and a passage in the middle, for international and domestic traffic; original car type: AB, B
WLee	1980	2004	10	Air-conditioned corridor sleeping car for international and domestic traffic
WLl	1980		2	Corridor sleeping car for international and domestic traffic
BCee	1984	2008	7	Second class-only air-conditioned corridor couchette car for international and domestic travel - the beds can be converted into seats for the daytime travel; original car type: B
BCl	1984		8	Second class-only corridor couchette car for international and domestic traffic - the beds can be converted into seats for the daytime travel
WRee	1980	1995–1997, 2005	2	Air-conditioned dining car for international and domestic traffic
Beet	1986–1987	2011–2013	20	Second class-only air-conditioned car for domestic traffic with seats and a passage in the middle; only type of car in the active fleet manufactured by "Janko Gredelj" and "Boris Kidrič"; original car type: Bt
Bee	1983–1986	2006–2009	5	Second class-only corridor car for international and domestic traffic, some units have space for bicycles; original car type: A, B

== Withdrawn stock ==
- HŽ 1061 (electric locomotive)
- HŽ 1161 (electric locomotive)
- HŽ 2061 (diesel locomotive)
- HŽ 2062-1 (diesel locomotive)
- HŽ 2042 (diesel locomotive)
- HŽ 2043 (diesel locomotive)
- HŽ 2131 (diesel shunter)
- HŽ 2133 (diesel shunter)
- HŽ 2141 (diesel shunter)
- HŽ 6011 (electric multiple unit, withdrawn in 2009)
- HŽ 7021 (DMU)
- HŽ 7221 (railbus; withdrawn in 2009)
- HŽ Al / Bl (passenger railroad car series for international and domestic traffic built between the 1960s and 1980s, withdrawn during the 2010s and 2020s)
- HŽ Baat (two-axle passenger railroad car series for domestic traffic built in the 1960s and withdrawn during the first half of the 2000s)

=== Rented locomotives and test vehicles in Croatia ===
- HŽ series 1081 -> These were rented from PKP Poland in 1995–1996
- FS E 402B -> Italian locomotive was on test
- V43 -> Hungarian locomotive used on Botovo-Koprivnica-Zagreb line

== Renumbering ==
In 1993 HŽ renumbered all their vehicles. This results in some confusion to the relation to their previous numbers. All other companies, which have been formed after dissolution of JŽ have kept the original numbers.

== Higher speed passenger travel ==
In Croatia, these well known international brand names were on test:

- Cisalpino
- Pendolino

Hrvatske Željeznice wants to modernise and speed up passenger traffic since they are limited to max. 160 km/h. There have been tests performed with both trains. Although they performed well they were not purchased, due to a lack of funds. It is planned to upgrade the track to 200 – 250 km/h in future. These units will most likely not be purchased in the end. A cheaper solution for passenger traffic is sought.

== See also ==
- List of preserved steam locomotives in Croatia
