= Class 321 =

Class 321 may refer to:

- British Rail Class 321, British rail unit
- FS Class E.321, Italian shunting locomotive
- Renfe Class 321
