= 1900 class =

1900 class or Class 1900 may refer to:

- CP Class 1900, diesel-electric locomotives
- Queensland Railways 1900 class rail motor
- Renfe Class 1900, diesel-electric locomotives
