= Renfe Class 319 (later versions) =

Class of Spanish diesel-electric locomotive

Renfe 319.2, Renfe 319.3, Renfe 319.4
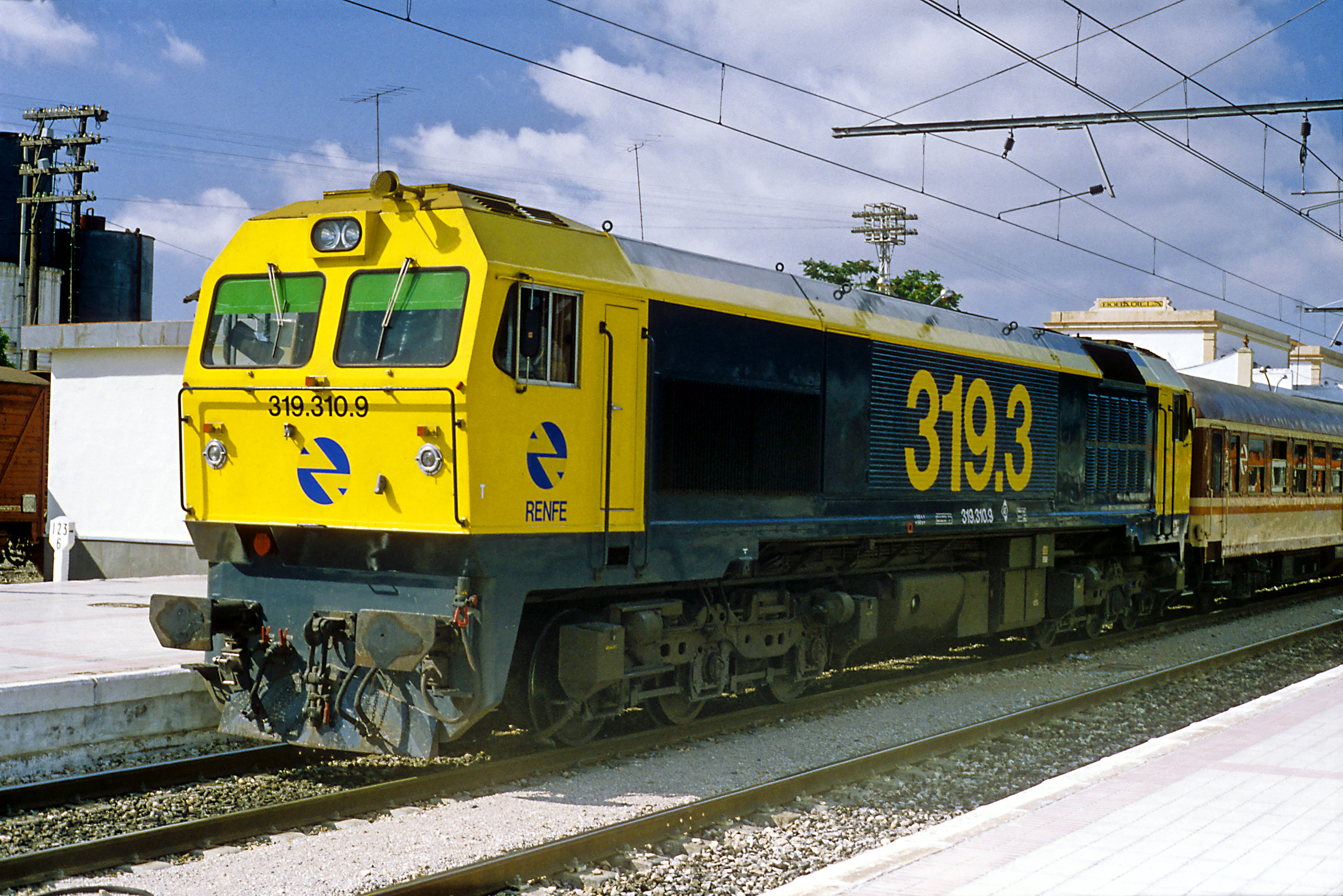
- Renfe 319.310 (June 1993)
Type and origin
- Power type: Diesel-electric
- Builder: Macosa / Meinfesa, GM-EMD components
- Model: 319.2 J16 CW/AC; 319.3 J26 CW/HEP; 319.4 J26 CW-SS
- Build date: 319.2 1984-5 (20), 1990–1 (28), 1992 (10); 319.3 1991-2; 319.4 1992
- Total produced: 319.2 58; 319.3 40; 319.4 10
Specifications
- Configuration
  - UIC: Co'Co'
- Gauge: 1,668 mm (5 ft 5 21/32 in); 1,435 mm (4 ft 8 1/2 in)
- Wheel diameter: 1,067 mm (42 in)
- Length: 19.500 m (63 ft 11.7 in) (over buffers)
- Width: 3,080 mm (121.26 in) except 319.201 to 319.220 2,800 mm (110.24 in)
- Height: 4,145 mm (163.19 in) except 319.201 to 319.220 4,034 mm (158.82 in)
- Loco weight: 319.201 to 319.220; 112 t (110 long tons; 123 short tons); 319.221 to 319.258; 110 t (110 long tons; 120 short tons); 319.3; 117 t (115 long tons; 129 short tons); 319.4; 116 t (114 long tons; 128 short tons)
- Fuel capacity: 4,500 L (1,200 US gal; 990 imp gal)
- Prime mover: 319.2 GM-EMD 16-567C or 16-567E; 319.3 GM-EMD 16-645-E or 16-567E; 319.4 GM-EMD 16-645-E
- Alternator: 319.2, 319.3 D14
- Generator: 319.2 AR10-D1, aux A8102 A2; 319.3 AR10-D1, aux A8102, head end power HE5 (300kW)
- Traction motors: D77 (6 of) (DC series wound, nose suspended)
- Cylinder size: 319.2; 215.9 mm × 254 mm (8.50 in × 10.00 in); 319.3, 319.4; 230.9 mm × 254 mm (9.09 in × 10.00 in) bore x stroke
- MU working: yes
- Loco brake: Pneumatic, Rheostatic
Performance figures
- Maximum speed: 319.2 119.7 km/h (74.4 mph); 319.3 140 km/h (87 mph); 319.4 120 km/h (75 mph)
- Power output: 319.2; 1,870 hp (1,390 kW); 319.3; 2,027 hp (1,512 kW); 319.4; 2,027 hp (1,512 kW) at rail 319.2; 1,870 hp (1,390 kW); 319.3; 1,876 hp (1,399 kW)
- Tractive effort: continuous 319.2; 236 kN (53,000 lb_{f}) @ 18 km/h (11 mph); 319.3; 209 kN (47,000 lb_{f}) @ 25 km/h (16 mph); 319.3; 209 kN (47,000 lb_{f}) @ 25 km/h (6.9 m/s)
Career
- Operators: Renfe

The Renfe classes 319.2, 319.3 and 319.4 are six axle Co'Co' medium power mainline diesel-electric locomotives manufactured by Macosa using General Motors Electromotive division components under license.

== Background and design ==
The first GM mainline locomotives in Spain were the Renfe Class 1900 locomotives, introduced in the mid-1960s, built in both America, and under license by Macosa; over one hundred were built and these were later given the numbers 319-001 to 319-103. In the 1980s the company started to upgrade its diesel fleet; the original class 319s began to be scrapped and a new version, twenty of which, were constructed, forming the sub-class 319.2 with numbers running from 319.201 upwards.

The new locomotive continued the GM-EMD tradition using the same engine and bogies but with other components completely new such as the generator. Opinions differ as to whether or not the locomotives represented a re-build or conversion of the old class. However some of the old components from the earlier locomotives were reused.

A trial of 20 locomotives was produced, and resulted in eventually 108 locomotives of the being built in total.

The first locomotives were constructed between 1984–85 and were numbered 319.201 to 319.220, these had three windows in the front of the cabin, and as a result got the nickname Retales (meaning 'patchwork' from retal a scrap, piece or oddment). Most were painted in grey/blue/yellow colour scheme, and later received the grey/yellow 'Taxi' colour scheme. Two units also received a brown, yellow and orange livery named Estrella. The machines worked well, and a further 20 locomotives were built in between 1990 and 1991 by Meinfesa, to the same electro-mechanical design but with two pane front windows and different body shape, the locomotives also had an air-conditioning unit fitted as standard into the design. These 58 machines formed the sub-class 319.2. 8 of the units were built for AVE with 1435mm gauge running gear (219.241 to 219.248) and received the white/grey AVE livery, the remainder received the standard freight yellow/grey 'Taxi' livery.

A second series of 40 locomotives, 319.3 were built between 1991–92 with an additional electrical generator for electrical train supply and a higher operating speed for passenger train services. The diesel engines had a higher engine bore helping to provide the additional 300 kW power required by the auxiliary generator, and the additional demands of higher speeds. The locomotives were delivered in standard grey/yellow livery but many subsequently received the blue and white liveries of the Grandes Lineas Altaria and Arco passenger services.

The final sub-class 319.4 were made in 1992; built for freight work with non head end power, the locomotives differed from all previous versions, replacing electromechanical speed control with more advanced microprocessor controlled anti-wheel slip control (described by GM-EMD as super-series control) working in conjunction with speed sensing ground radar. Externally the locomotives are indistinguishable from the earlier version. All were given the standard freight 'Taxi' blue and grey with large numerals livery.

== Operation ==
The sub-classes 319.2 and 319.4 worked primarily on freight trains, in multiple on heavier trains, some of the 319.2 series were also used, fitted with standard gauge wheelsets on the construction of the first AVE line between Madrid and Seville.

The class 319.3 initially worked on passenger services, as designed, but have been displaced due to their relatively low power. By 2004 5 had been assigned to infrastructure trains.

One unit fitted with Siemens equipment was used for testing on the installation of ETCS on the Madrid to Barcelona to France high speed line.

=== Exports ===
==== Argentina ====
Fifty three of the 319 class along with ~100 diesel multiple units, over one hundred and thirty Talgo carriages, as well as over one hundred carriages and vans were sold to the Ministry of Transport of Argentina in a sale worth €120 million. The vehicles were acquired for its Plan Nacional de Recuperación Ferroviaria de Argentina, part of a countrywide development investment plan worth $111 billion.

By 2010 over twenty of the class had been shipped, with some still undergoing overhaul in preparation. In Argentina the locomotives have been used for the Línea San Martín (LSM). (Note: LSM – ESPECIAL ex-Renfe 319, www.youtube.com)

==== Saudi Arabia ====
In 2014 several class 319 were transferred to the Saudi Railways Organization.

Liveries and sub-types of Renfe Class 319
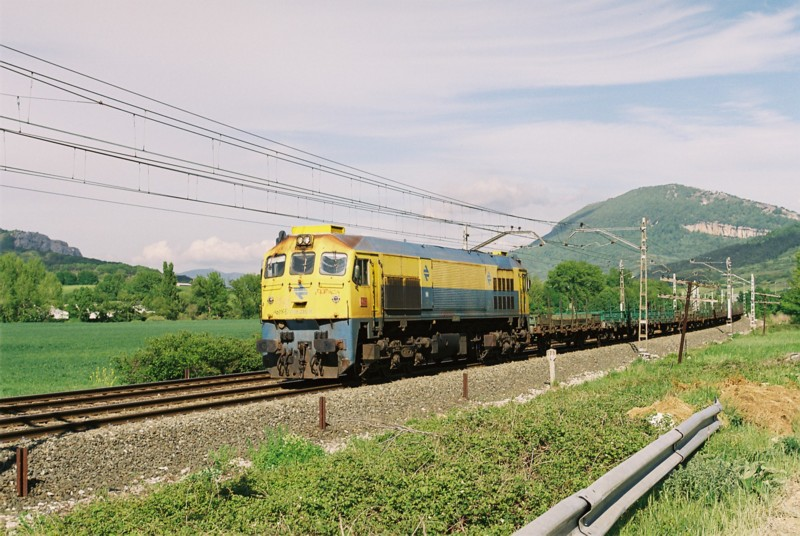
Three window 319.2 retales in original blue/grey – yellow livery

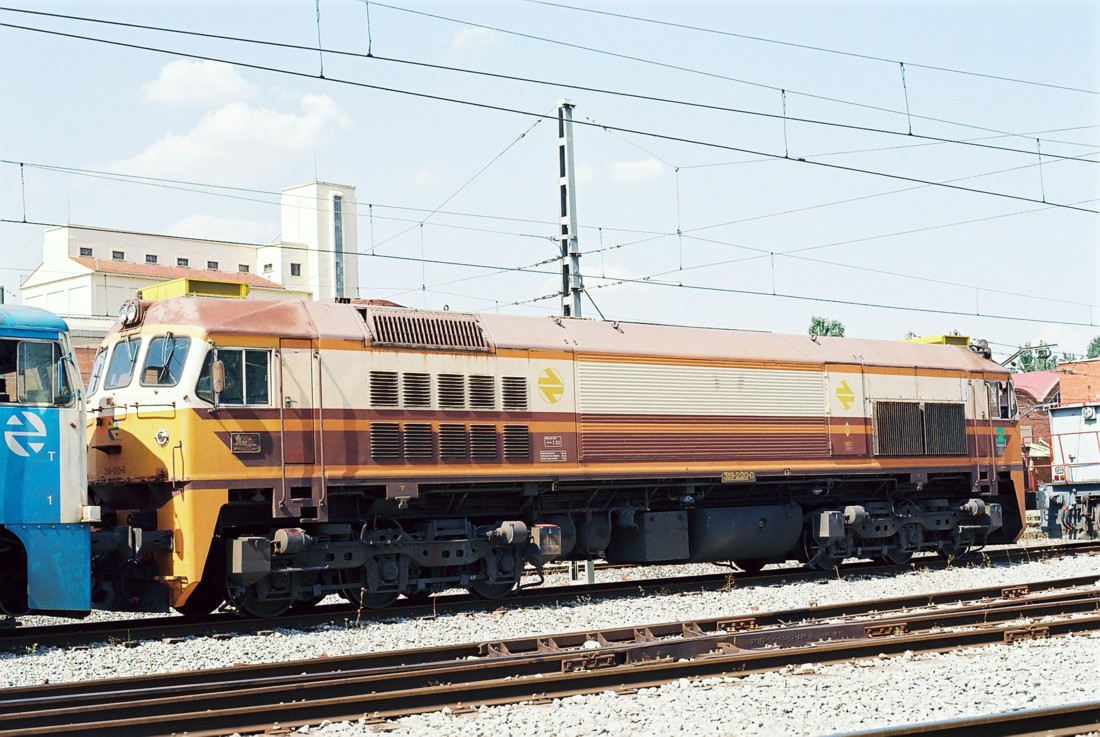
Three window type 319.2 retales in Estrela livery

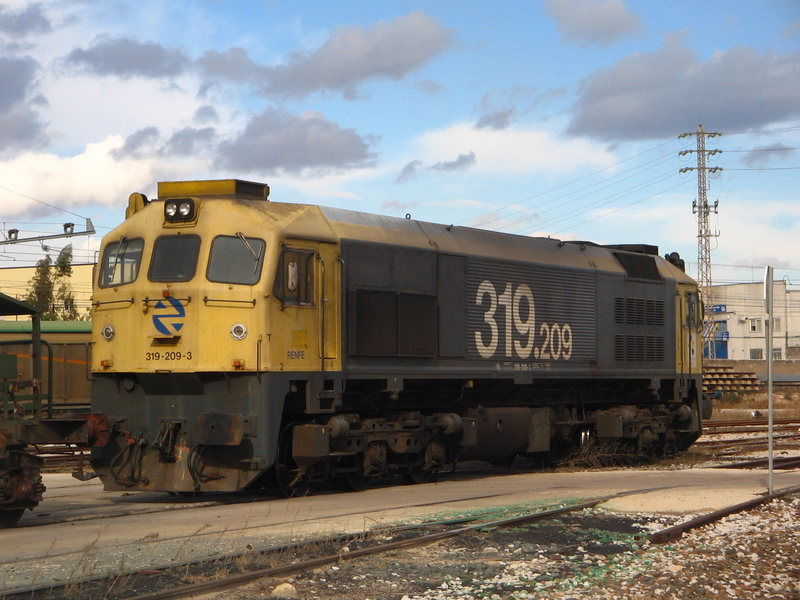
319.2 retales Note external air-conditioning units on cab roofs

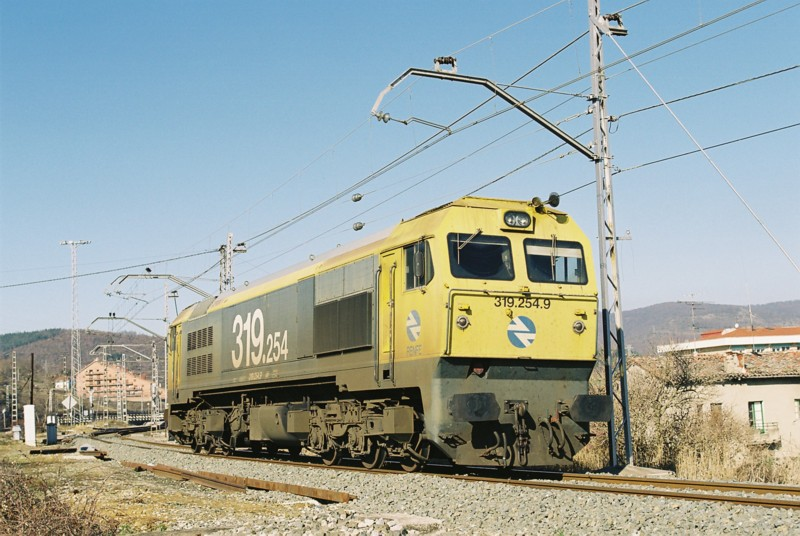
319.2 later type, roof mounted air conditioning is enclosed

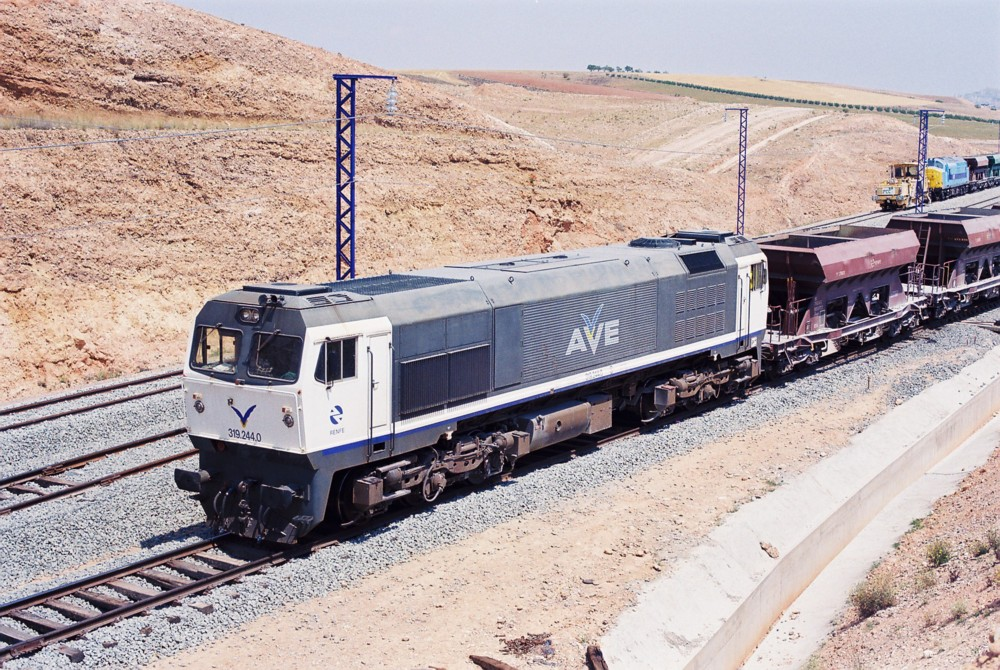
Standard gauge 319.2 in AVE livery (construction train)

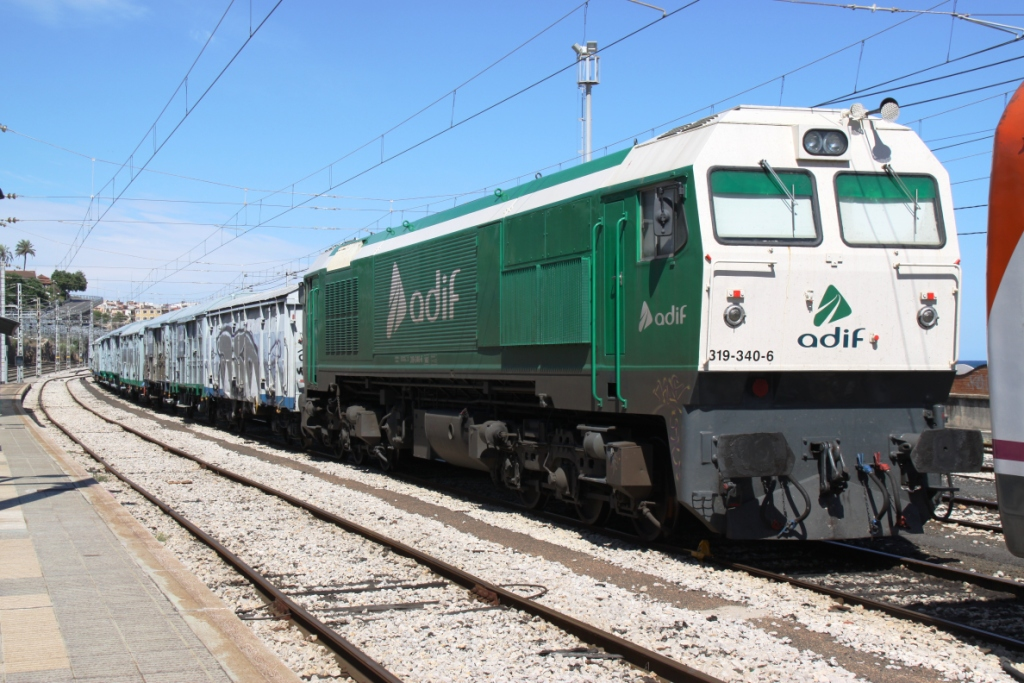
319.3 in ADIF (Infrastructure) livery

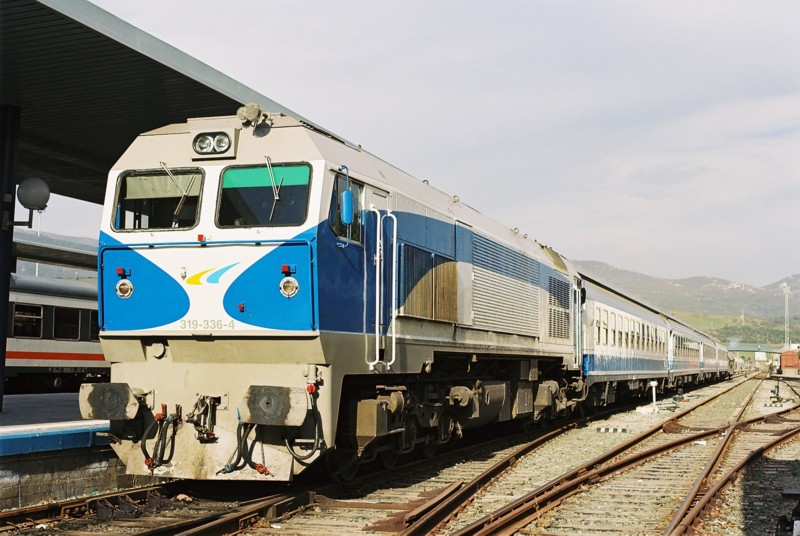
319.3 in blue-white passenger train livery

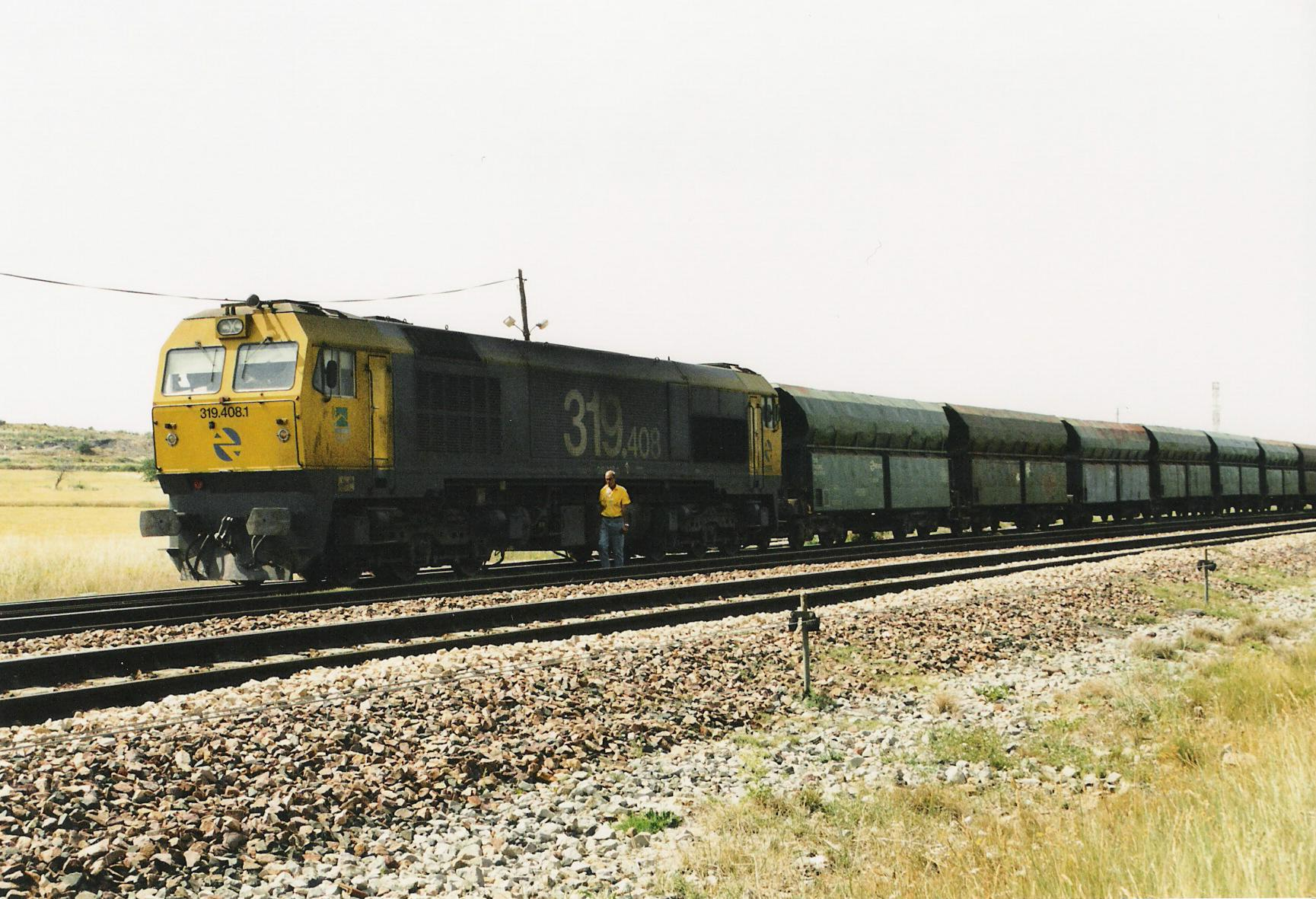
319.4 in standard yellow/grey 'Taxi' freight livery

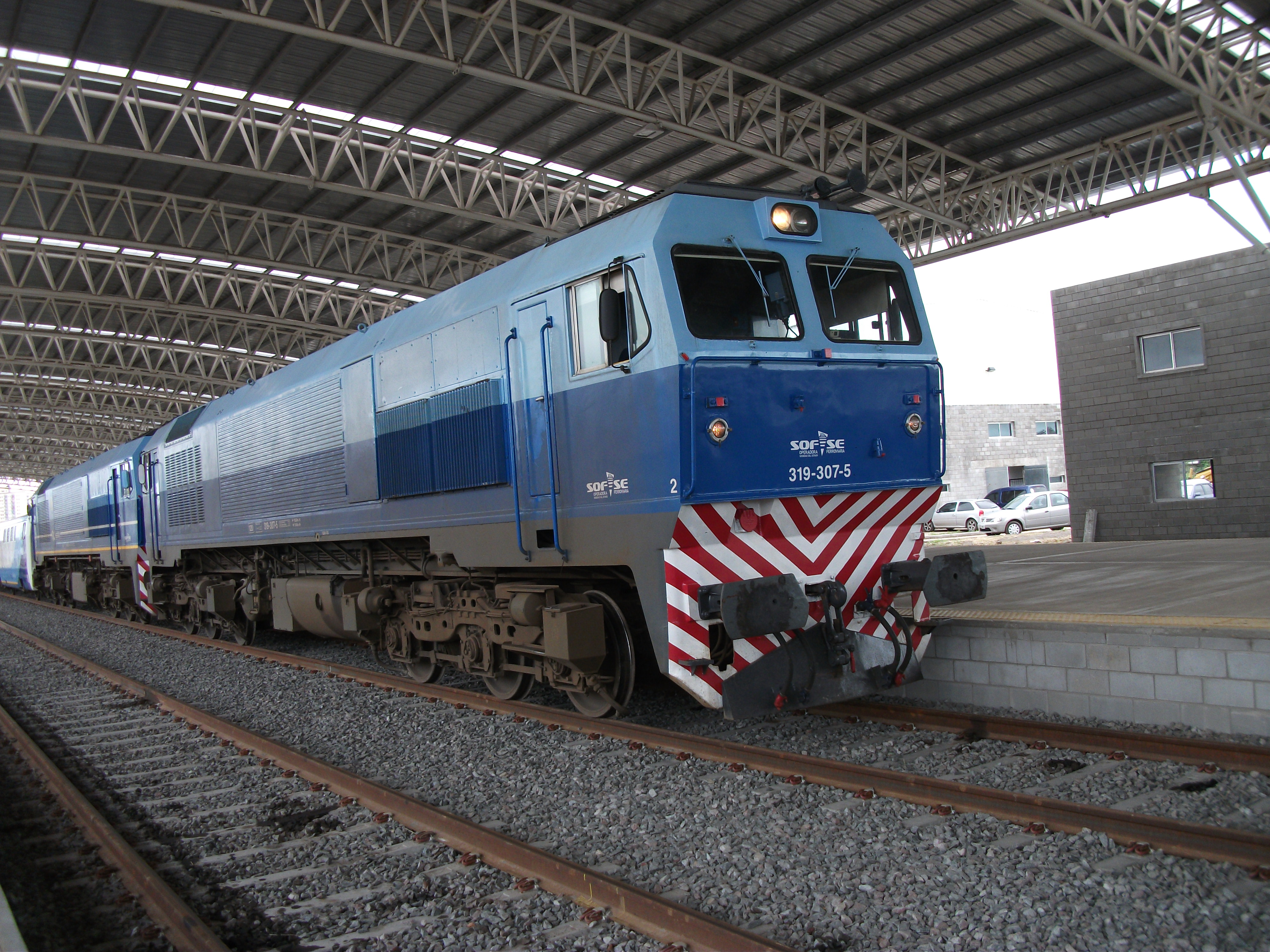
319.4 in Argentina

== Miniature models ==
In HO scale Roco has produced the different variants of the subclass 319.2, as well as the 319.3 and 319.4 subclasses. The original single cab "american" version has also been produced in HO scale.

In N scale Startrain has produced subclasses 319.2, 319.3 and 319.4.
