= Renfe Class 319 (early versions) =

Class of Spanish diesel-electric locomotive

Renfe 319 Renfe 1900
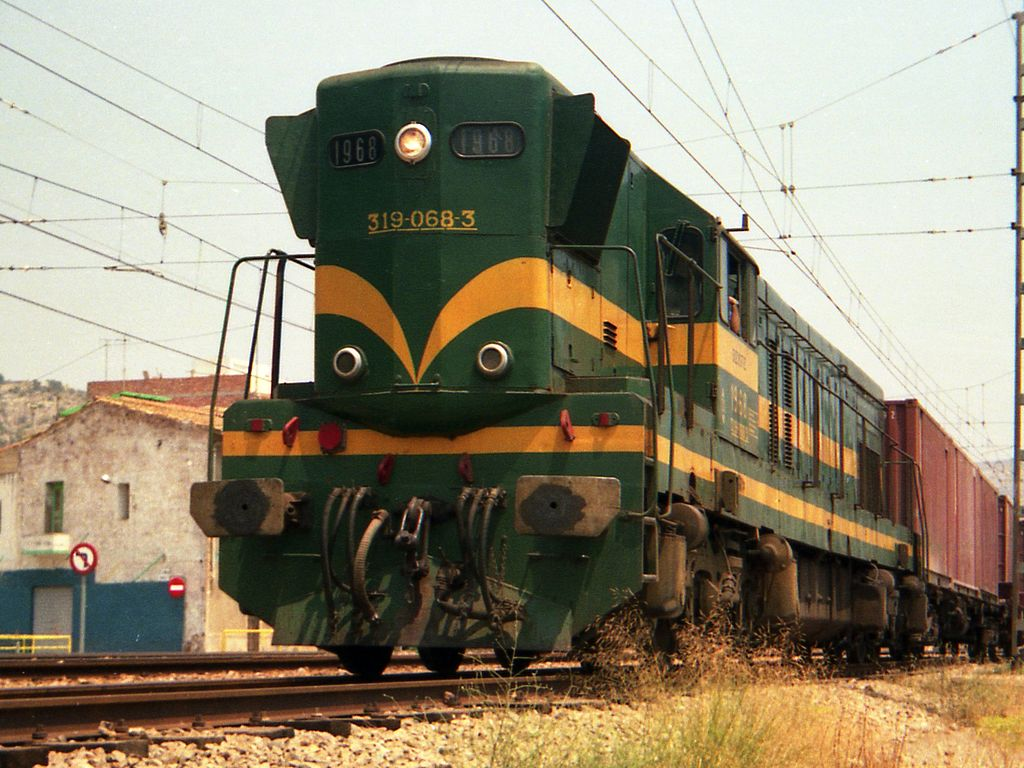
- American built Renfe 319.068 (single cab version)
Type and origin
- Power type: Diesel-electric
- Builder: Electro-Motive Division, Macosa
- Model: EMD G16
- Build date: 1965-1973
- Total produced: 103
Specifications
- Configuration
  - UIC: Co'Co'
- Gauge: 1,668 mm (5 ft 5 21/32 in)
- Wheelbase: bogie centre distance 11.552 m (37 ft 10.8 in)
- Length: 19.550 m (64 ft 1.7 in)
- Width: 2.800 m (9 ft 2.2 in)
- Height: 4.233 m (13 ft 10.7 in)
- Loco weight: 319.061 to 319.070; 111 t (109 long tons; 122 short tons) others 105 t (103 long tons; 116 short tons)
- Prime mover: GM 16-567-C
- Generator: GM D-32-L
- Traction motors: GM D-29 (6 of)
- Transmission: Electric
- MU working: yes
- Loco brake: Pneumatic, rheostatic
Performance figures
- Maximum speed: 120 km/h (75 mph)
- Power output: 1,570 hp (1,170 kW)
Career
- Operators: Renfe
- Locale: Spain

The Renfe Class 319 (originally Renfe 1900 (Note: The prefix 3 is added to indicate a diesel-electric locomotive)) was a class of mainline medium-high powered diesel electric locomotives built by General Motors Electro-Motive Division and by Macosa (under license) for the state railways of Spain.

== Background, history and design ==
In the mid-1960s General Motors won a contract to supply diesel-electric locomotives to Renfe, which was seeking replacements for steam engines. The contract was for the locomotives to be built under license in Spain, but as the diesel locomotive building infrastructure in Spain was not yet developed the first ten locomotives were constructed at GM's locomotive factory in La Grange, Illinois, USA; these were of an American single cabin design. The American locomotives were Iberian gauge versions of the General Motors Electromotive type G16.

The remaining ninety three of the class were built by Macosa under license; though the locomotives contained the same components the arrangement of the components in the Spanish built versions was different, since the Spanish models were built to a two cab design of more European appearance.

The class worked on both freight and passenger trains, until the late 1980s when Renfe decided to replace the class. Some parts of the old locomotives were reused for the new class, named Renfe 319.2 which also used the same GM engine as well as other common parts such as the bogies.

=== Numbering ===
The Spanish built units were numbered 1901 to 1960, 1971 to 1999 and because all the digits of the 1900 class had been expended, 19901 to 19904, the American units were originally numbered 1961 to 1970. Later the class became 319 and the numbers ran from 319.001 to 319.103.

== See also ==
- Renfe Class 319 (later versions)
- Renfe Class 321, contemporary locomotives, built to an Alco design
