= EMD G16 =

American diesel locomotive

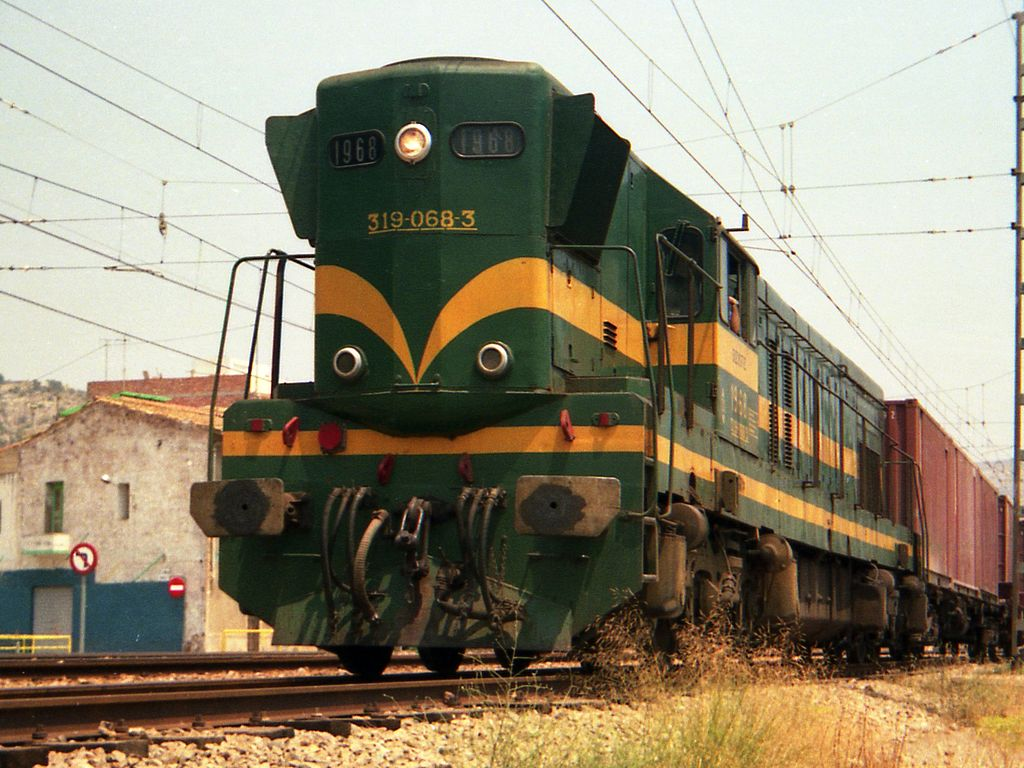
- Renfe 319.068
Type and origin
- Power type: Diesel–electric
- Builder: Electro-Motive Diesel – General Motors Diesel, Clyde Engineering, MACOSA
- Model: G16
- Build date: 1958–1972
- Total produced: 430
Specifications
- Configuration
  - AAR: C-C
  - UIC: Co'Co'
- Gauge: 1,000 mm (3 ft 3 3/8 in) metre gauge 4 ft 8 1/2 in (1,435 mm) standard gauge 5 ft 3 in (1,600 mm); 1,668 mm (5 ft 5 21/32 in)
- Length: 18.471 m (60 ft 7 1/4 in)
- Loco weight: 108 tonnes (106 long tons; 119 short tons) (Yugoslav subseries 000); 112 tonnes (110 long tons; 123 short tons) (Yugoslav subseries 100)
- Fuel capacity: 3,028 litres (800 US gal; 666 imp gal)
- Prime mover: EMD 16-567C (Some changed to 16-645E)
- Engine type: V16 diesel
- Cylinders: 16
- Cylinder size: 8.5 in × 10 in (216 mm × 254 mm)
Performance figures
- Maximum speed: 124 km/h (77 mph)
- Power output: 1,800 bhp (1,300 kW), 1,826 or 1,925 bhp (1,362 or 1,435 kW)
- Tractive effort: 26,000 kg_{f} (255.0 kN); 26,000 kg_{f} (57,000 lb_{f}) (Egypt & Israel)
Career
- Numbers: HŽ-2061
- Nicknames: "Kenedi" (former Yugoslavia), "Tlaconete" (Mexico)
- Locale: Australia, Brazil, Bosnia and Herzegovina, Croatia, Egypt, Hong Kong, Israel, Kosovo, Mexico, North Macedonia, Serbia, Slovenia and Spain

The EMD G16 is a diesel locomotive built by General Motors in the US and under licence by Clyde Engineering in Australia and MACOSA in Spain. It has been used in Australia, Brazil, Egyptian Railways, Hong Kong, Israel Railways, Mexico, Spain, Yugoslav Railways and on the successor Croatian Railways, Slovenian Railways, Serbian Railways, Macedonian Railways, Republika Srpska Railways, Kosovo Railways and Railways of the Federation of Bosnia and Herzegovina.

== Australia ==
The Victorian Railways bought six G16C locomotives locally built by Clyde Engineering, known as the X class.

== Brazil ==
In Brazil 41 locomotives were imported. The first eleven were introduced in 1962 and numbered 601–641, and the remaining thirty locomotives were imported in 1964–66. Thirty-seven locomotives still operate trains on the Vitória a Minas Railroad.

== Egypt ==
EMD supplied Egyptian Railways with 111 G16s in 1960–61 (ER numbers 3301–61) and seventeen G16Ws in 1964–65 (ER numbers 3362–411).

== Iran ==
20 60.301–60.320

== Israel ==
During the Six-Day War, Israel captured Egyptian Railways 3304, 3329 and 3361 which were appropriated into Israel Railways stock as numbers 301–303, later 161–163. All have now been withdrawn from service but 163 (formerly ER 3361) is preserved at the Israel Railway Museum.

== Hong Kong ==
In Hong Kong there are four locomotives imported for the Kowloon-Canton Railway. They would later be used by the MTR Corporation upon the merger. The first three were built by EMD in the US, introduced in 1961 and numbered 56–58. The fourth was built by Clyde Engineering in Australia, introduced in 1966 and numbered 59. They were named I.B. Trevor, Bobby Howes, Gordon Graham, and Gerry Forsgate respectively. All were equipped with 16-567C engines and Co-Co wheel arrangements. 59 suffered a collision and was rebuilt with a 16-645E engine. 57 retired in 2009 and was scrapped in late 2014, while 59 retired in 2018 after suffering serious damage from a collision with a EMD G26 locomotive, being scrapped in 2021. As of 2022, both remaining G16s have retired in Hong Kong; locomotive No. 56 I. B. Trevor is now on display in Hung Hom station since 2024 as part of the “Station Rail Voyage” exhibition.

== Mexico ==
In order to replace steam on the numerous light rail branches operated by the Nacionales de Mexico (N de M), EMD export models G12 and G16 were obtained. A total of 24 G16 units were built by EMD for the N de M, all equipped with dynamic brakes and introduced between August 1958 and July 1960, their running numbers being 7300 to 7323. The first thirteen units (Nr. 7300 to 7312) had close clearance cabs, and the last eleven units (Nr. 7313 to 7323) were delivered in 1960 and received a standard cab. No.7323 was pictured in 1963 with a standard cab, but appeared in 1974 with a close clearance cab, indicating that this unit was either rebuilt or more probably renumbered. Mexican railroaders nicknamed this locomotive as "Tlaconete", referring to the imperial salamander; it was the first engine that was painted in the olive green, red and white scheme that was kept until 1987.

== Spain ==
The Renfe Class 1961-70, later known as Renfe Class 319 were to the G16 design. Ten of the units were built at General Motors factory in the US and were single cabin machines, identical to a standard G16 with the exception of having Iberian gauge 1,668 mm (5 ft 5 21/32 in) wheelsets. A further 93 locomotives were built under license using the same components but as twin-cab machines with a different external appearance and internal arrangement of components.

== Yugoslav Railways ==
The EMD G16 (JŽ series 661) was one of the most used diesel locomotives in Yugoslavia. The type is colloquially nicknamed "Kenedi" after the US President John F. Kennedy. After the breakup in 1991, the locomotives were passed on to successor states:

=== Croatia ===
In Croatia the locomotive is classified HŽ series 2061. As of 2007, the series has been withdrawn from service. Six units of the series were modified by removing two of the traction engines into series 2043 locomotives during the early 1990s. None remain in active service.

=== Serbia, Bosnia and Herzegovina, North Macedonia and Slovenia ===
In Serbia, Bosnia and Herzegovina, North Macedonia and Slovenia have all kept the JŽ-era designation series 661.

Today there are around fifteen operational series 661s on Serbian Railways. Those locomotives are used mostly on non-electrified railways, primarily to haul freight trains, but also international passenger trains.

In Slovenia, the last 661 series locomotive ran on 17 May 2013, and it is now preserved as a historical unit.

=== Kosovo ===
Kosovo Railways operates three former JŽ series 661. A fourth locomotive (001) was renumbered but is out of service. They no longer carry a type designation, instead they were just numbered 001 to 004. They are used to haul coal and clay trains.

Locomotive 661-203 began a rebuilding program in 2008, undertaken by TŽV Gredelj (Croatia) in association with Electro-Motive Diesel; the bogies and traction motors were retained, but with a new frame and engine (EMD 8-710G3A). The locomotives were also converted to twin cab designs. The resulting new loco has EMD model code JT38CW-DC.

== Preservation ==
About six EMD G16s have been preserved. These include the following:

- Victorian Railways X Class no. X31 (Model EMD G16C) Preserved at Seymour Railway Heritage Centre in Seymour Victoria in South Australia.

- Kowloon-Canton Railway / MTR Corporation EMD G16 no. 56 'I.B. Trevor' Preserved at Hung Hom Station in Hung Hom Bay Kowloon in Hong Kong, China.

- Egyptian Railways no. 3361 / Israel Railways no. 163. Preserved at Israel Railway Museum in Haifa.

- Yugoslavian Railways JŽ Series 661 661-032 Preserved at the Railway Museum in Ljublijana, Slovenia.

- Yugoslavian Railways JŽ Series 661 no. 661-002 (2061.032) Preserved at the Croatian Railway Museum in Zagreb Croatia.

- Yugoslavian Railways JŽ Series 661 no. 661-216 (2061.025) Also Preserved at the Croatian Railways Museum in Zagreb in Croatia.

== Gallery ==
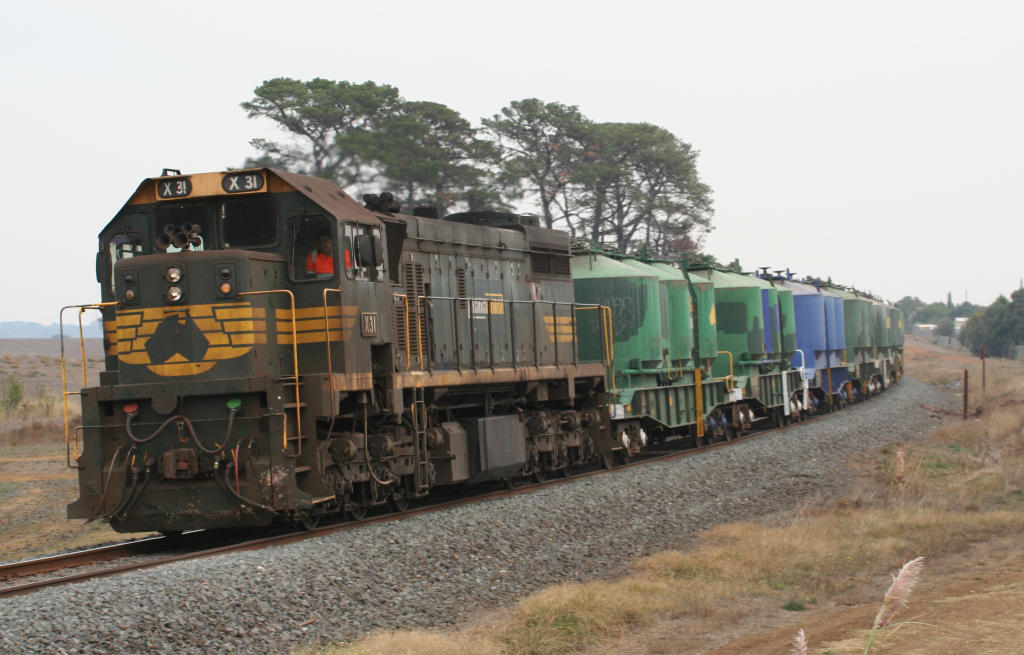
Pacific National X class G16C

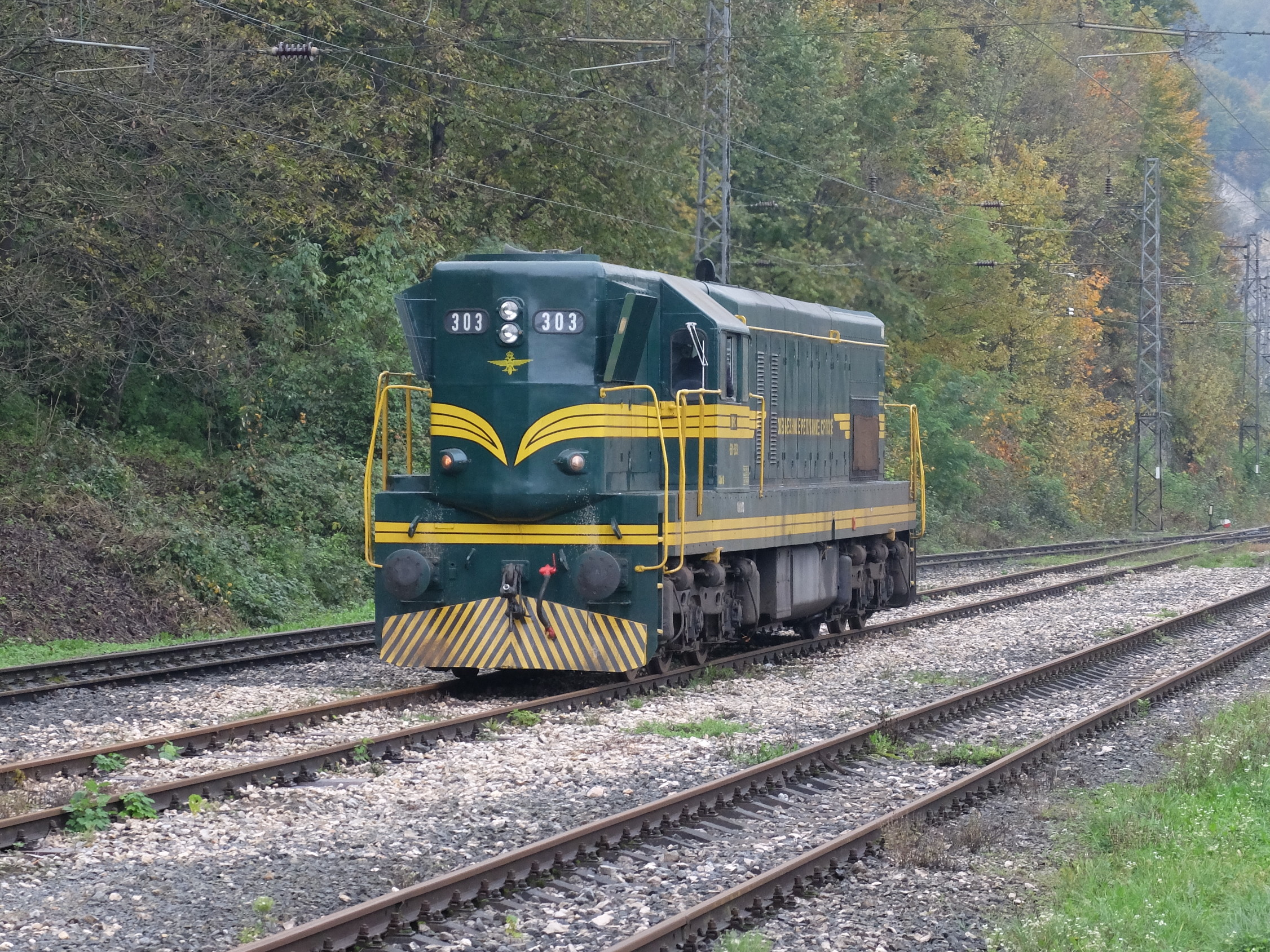
Bosnia & Herzegovina
ŽRS 661-303

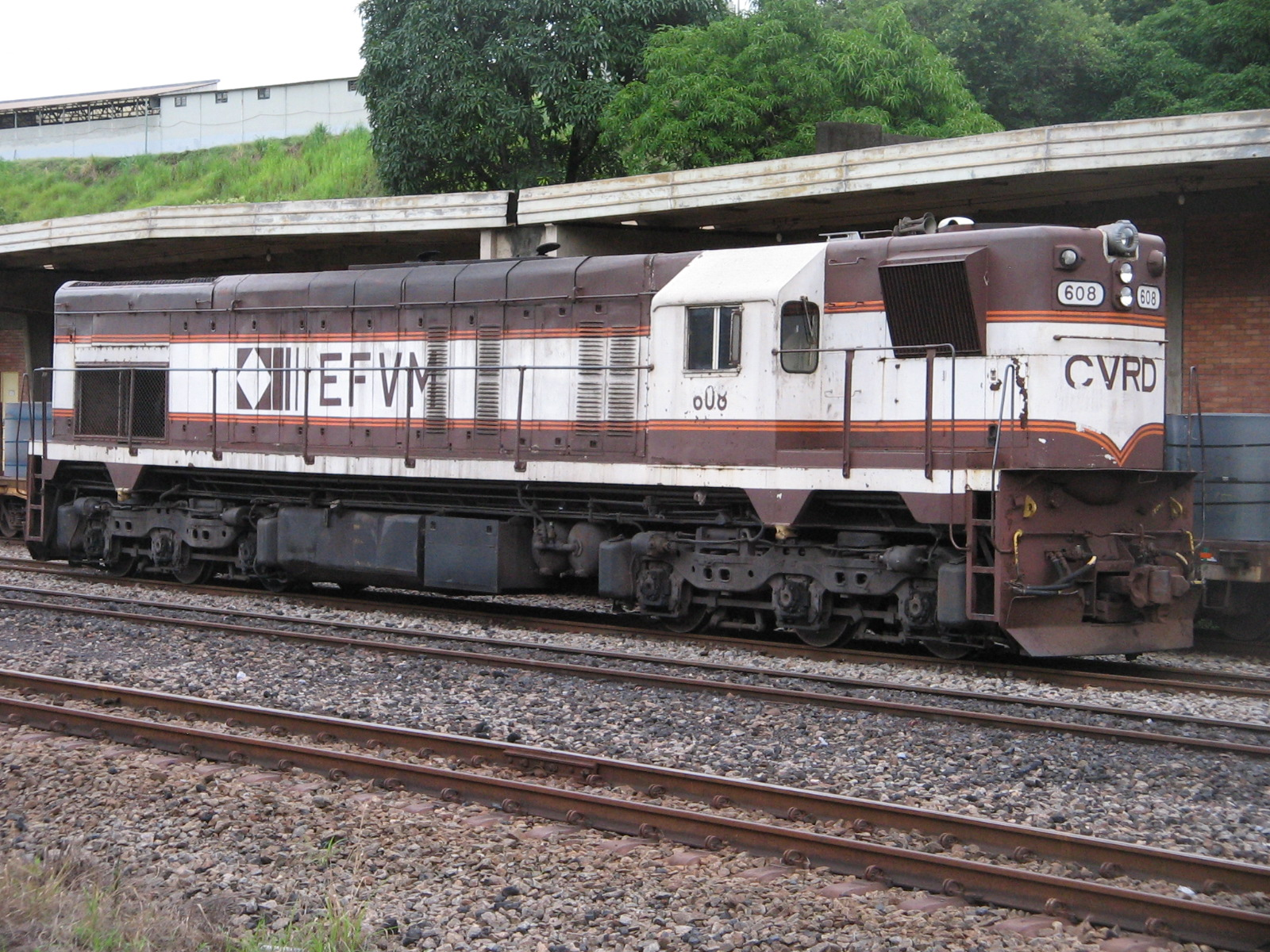
Brazilian EMD G16U #608 on the Vitória a Minas Railroad

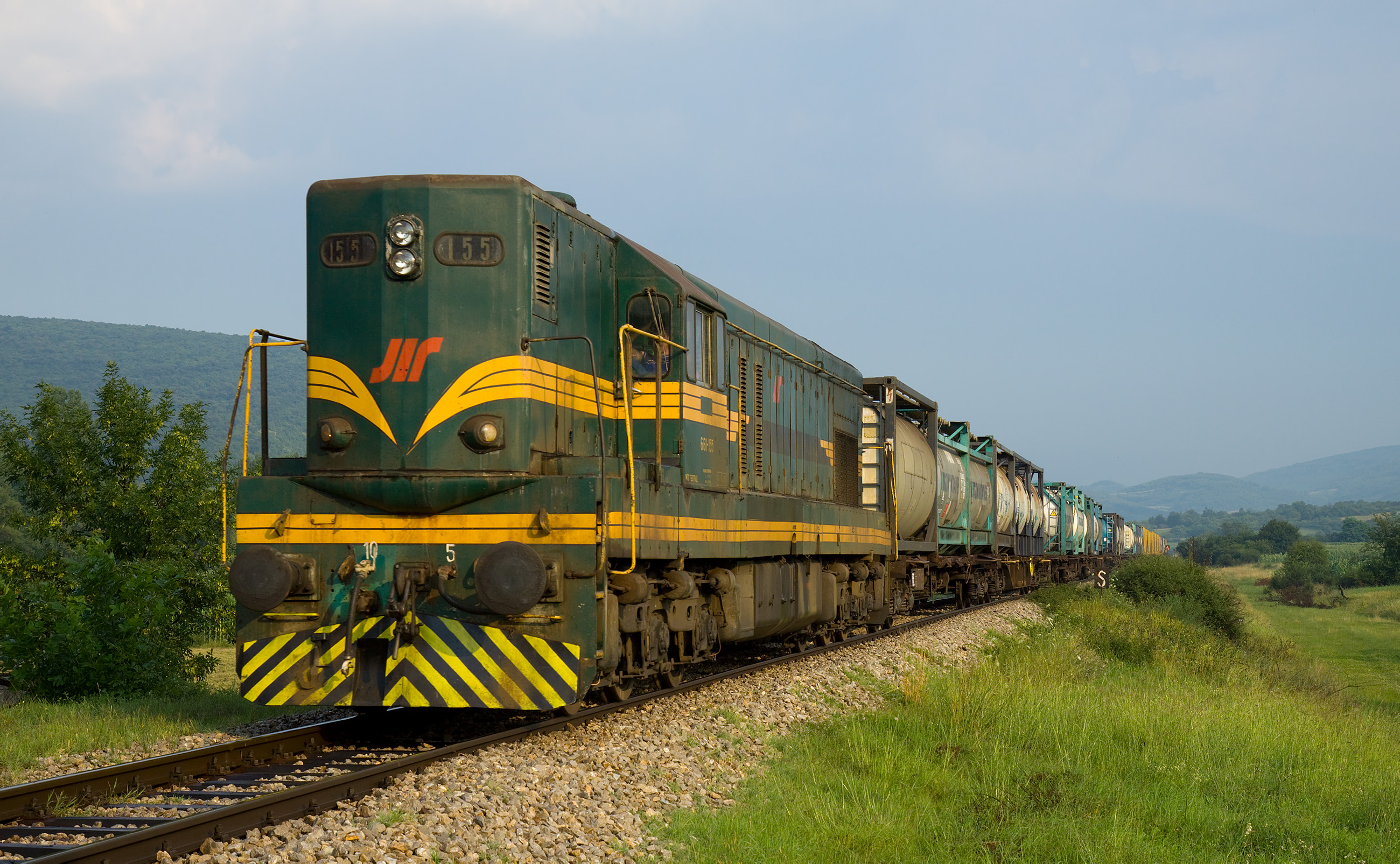
Železnice Srbije class 661 diesel locomotive, with an intermodal freight train from the Bulgarian border at Dimitrovgrad, on its way towards Niš.

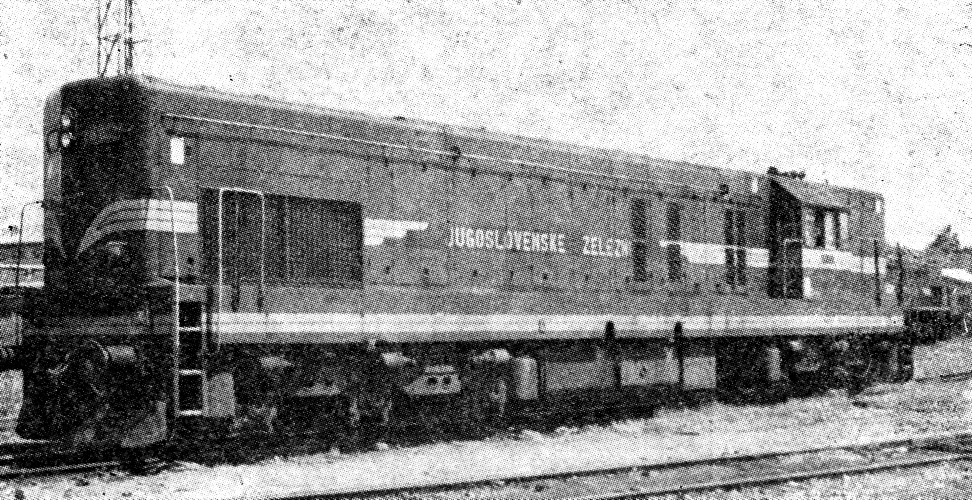
Yugoslav Railways 661 series at old station in Skopje

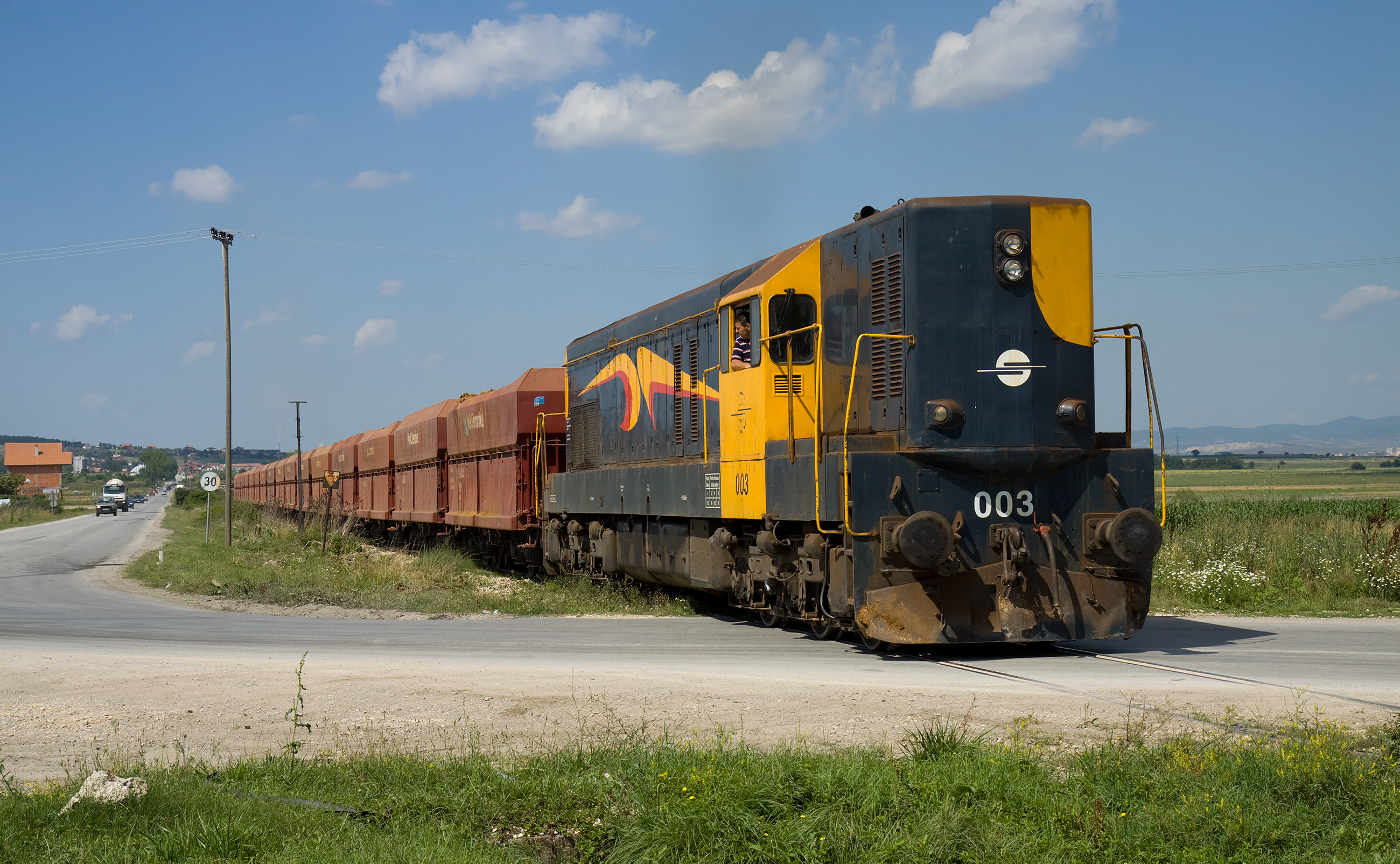
Kosovo Railways 003 with an empty clay train

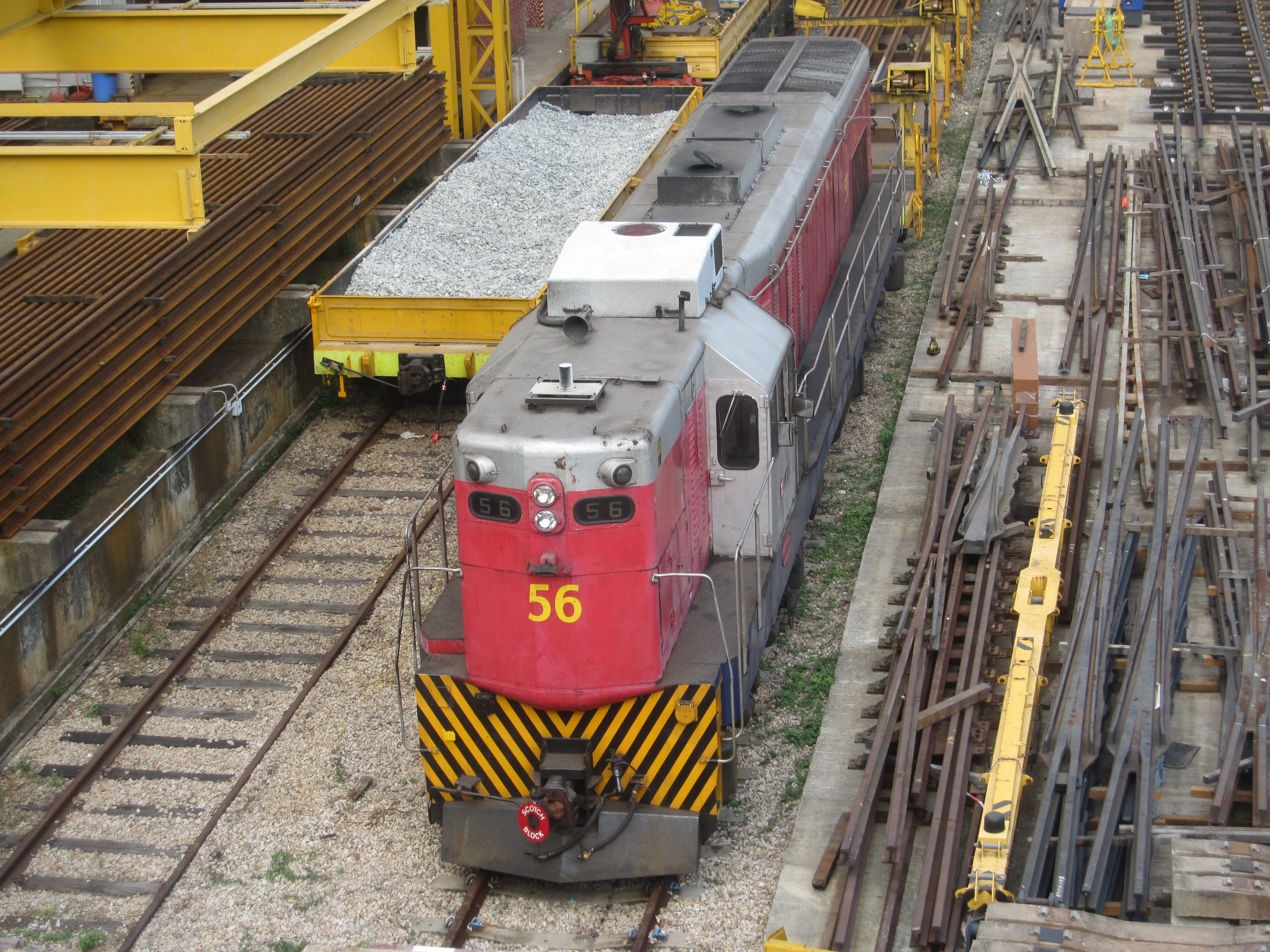
MTR #56

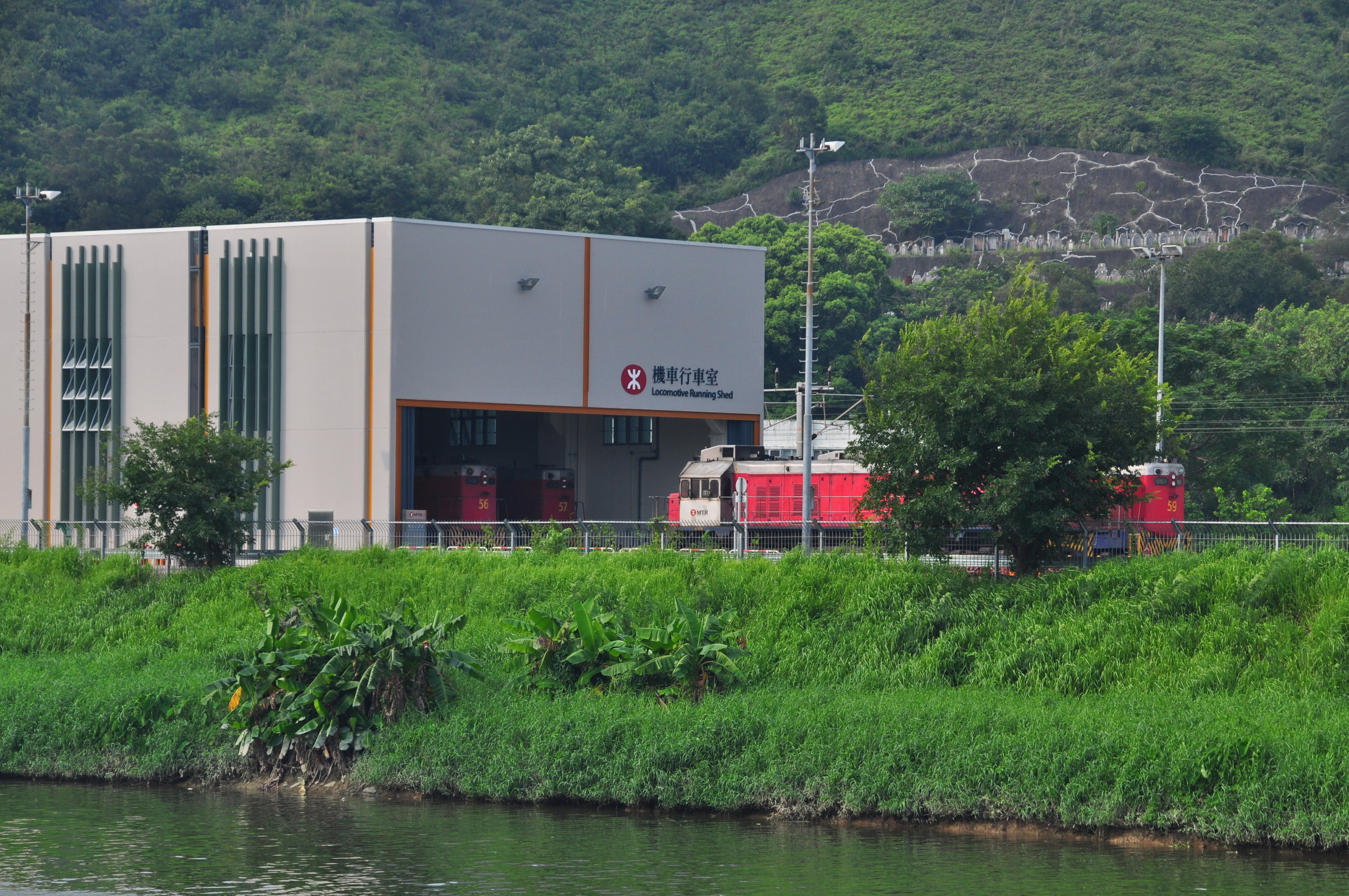
MTR #56,57,58,59

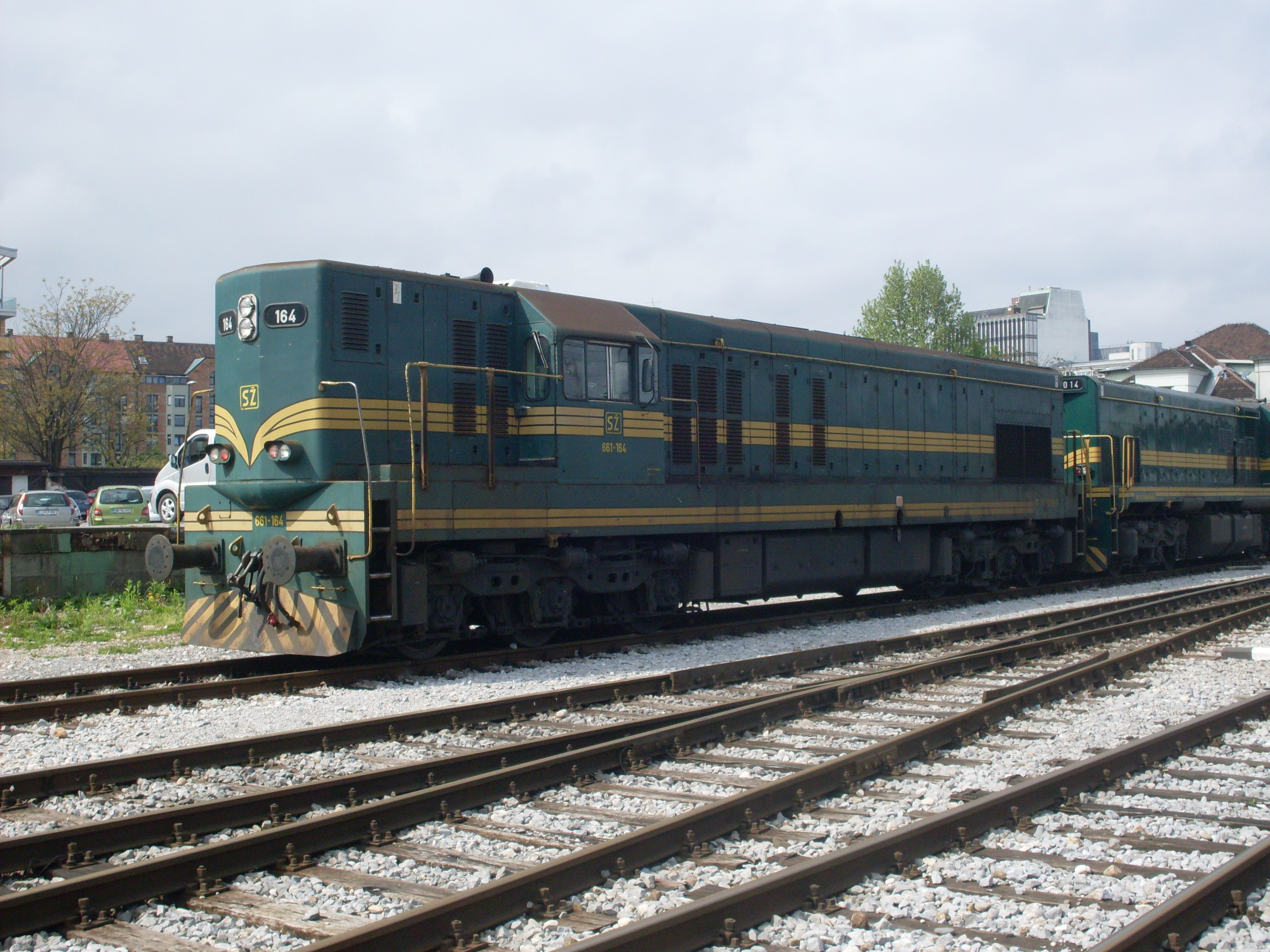
SŽ (Slovenske Železnice) class 661 in Ljubljana, Slovenia April 2011

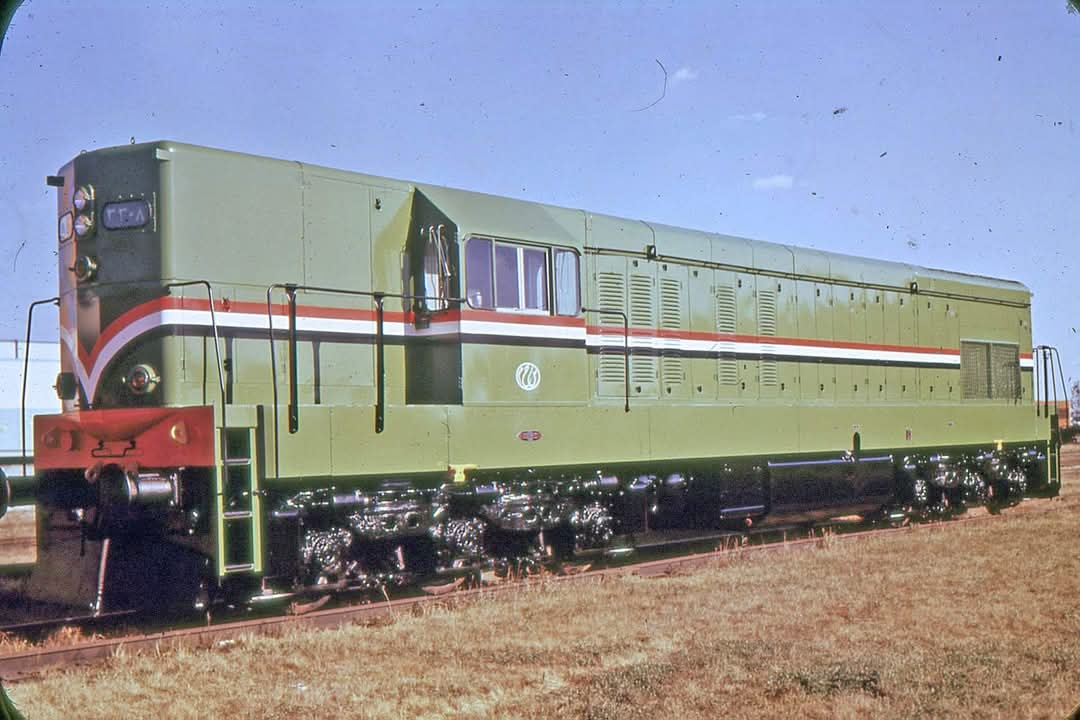
An EMD G16 used by the Egyptian National Railways

== See also ==
- Rolling stock of the Croatian Railways
