= HŽ series 2131 =

Series 2131
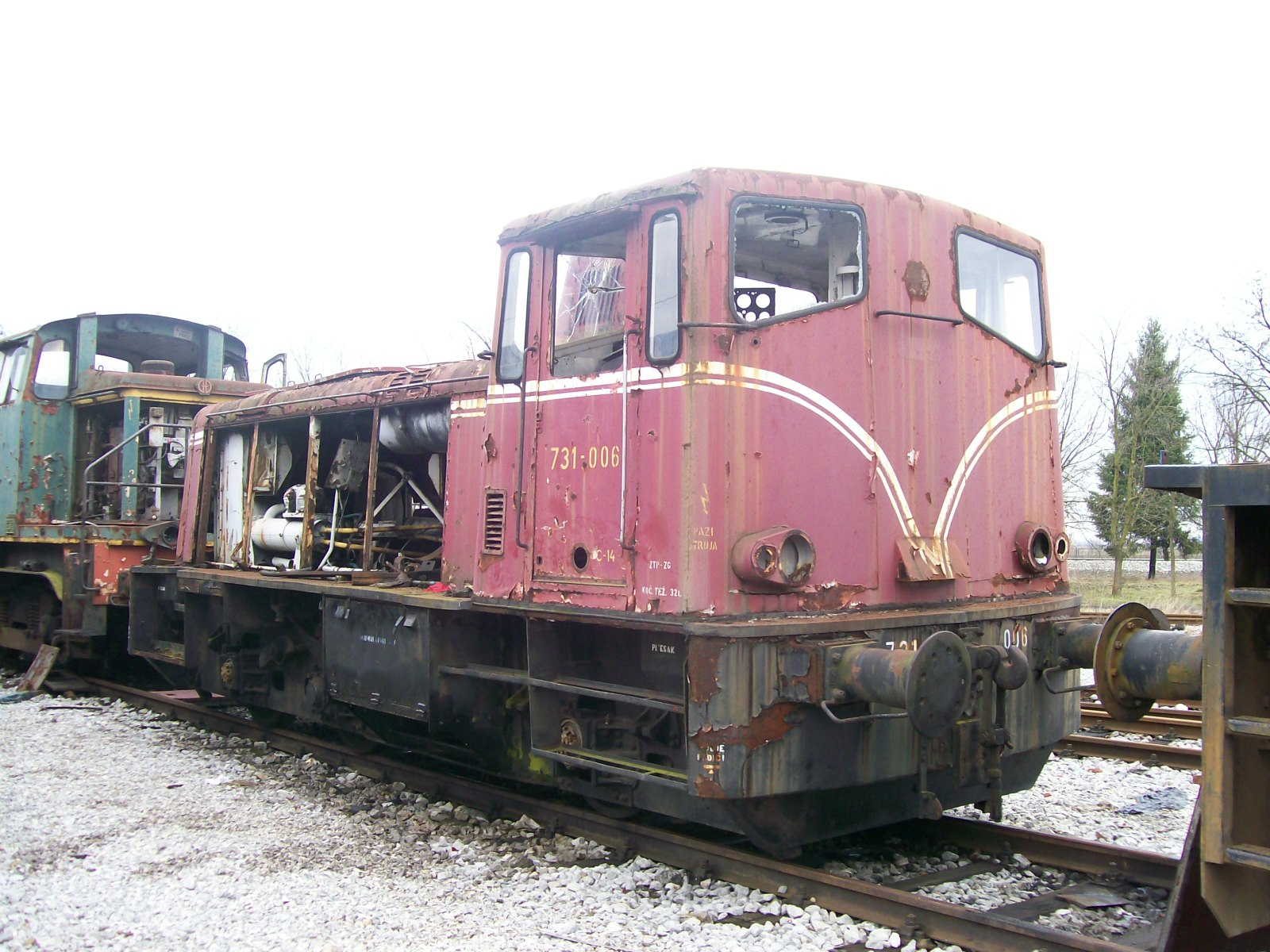
- Series 2131
Type and origin
- Power type: Diesel-hydraulic
- Builder: Đuro Đaković (license from Jenbach)
Specifications
- Configuration
  - UIC: C
- Gauge: 1,435 mm (4 ft 8 1/2 in)
- Length: 9.500 m (31 ft 2 in)
- Loco weight: 42.5 tonnes
Performance figures
- Maximum speed: 30/60 km/h
- Power output: 340 hp
Career
- Class: HŽ 2131
- Nicknames: "Jenbach"
- Locale: Croatia

Series 2131 (ex JŽ 731) is a diesel locomotive series on Croatian Railways (Croatian: hrvatske željeznice, HŽ).
