= HŽ series 7022 =

Croatian diesel locomotive

HŽ 7022
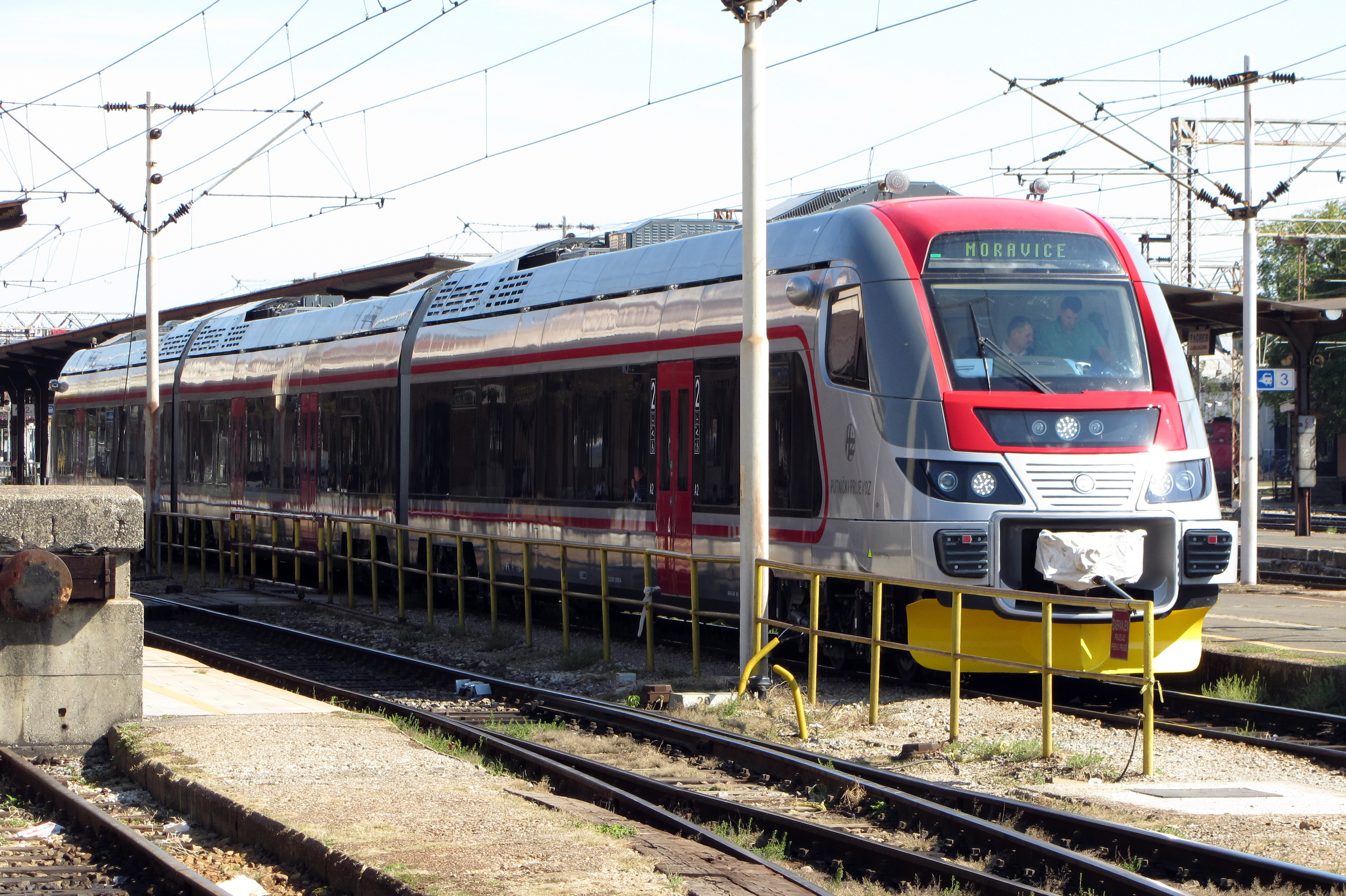
- Gredelj DMU HŽ 7022 series
- Manufacturer: TŽV Gredelj
- Constructed: 2011.-2012.
- Number in service: 1
- Formation: 3 parts
- Fleet numbers: 001
- Capacity: total: 410 seated: 209

Specifications
- Train length: 70.45 m (231 ft 2 in)
- Car length: 23.85 m (78 ft 3 in) (M); 23.00 m (75 ft 6 in) (T)
- Width: 2.86 m (9 ft 5 in)
- Height: 4.28 m (14 ft 1 in)
- Floor height: 570 mm (22.4 in)–875 mm (34.4 in)
- Doors: 8
- Maximum speed: 160 km/h (99 mph)
- Weight: 150 t (330,693 lb)
- Power output: 1,390 kW (1,864 hp)
- Acceleration: 0.7 m/s^{2} (2 ft/s^{2})
- Deceleration: 1 m/s^{2} (3 ft/s^{2})
- UIC classification: Bo’2’+2’Bo’+2’Bo’
- Track gauge: 1,435 mm (4 ft 8 1/2 in) standard gauge

HŽ series 7022 is a class of low-floor diesel multiple unit built for Croatian Railways (Croatian: Hrvatske željeznice, HŽ) by Croatia based company TŽV Gredelj. The prototype of diesel electric multiple unit for regional traffic is a 3-part train set composed of two end motor modules containing driver's cab and one middle motor module without driver's cab. All the modules are supported by two bogies, one of which is a drive bogie and the other one a running bogie. All drive equipment is situated on the roof of a module. On module roofs are mounted diesel generator groups with belonging converters, which supply and control the operation of electric drive motors situated in the bogie. In the door area of a module containing driver's cab there are installed toilet facilities, with one of them adapted for disabled persons in wheelchairs. Passenger and driver compartments of the train are fully air conditioned. Passenger compartment is equipped with a system for audio and video information for the passengers and free wireless internet (WiFi) is also provided.

== Main technical specifications ==
- Gauge: 1435 mm
- Axle arrangement: Bo’2’+2’Bo’+2’Bo’'
- Seating capacity: 209
- Standing capacity: 201
- Doors: 8
- Door width: 1300 mm
- Floor height: 570/600/875 mm
- Overall length: 70.45 m
- Vehicle width: 2885 mm
- Vehicle height: 4280 mm
- Maximum weight: 170 t
- Continuous power (on wheel): 1390 kW
- Starting traction force: 125 kN
- Maximum speed: 160 km/h

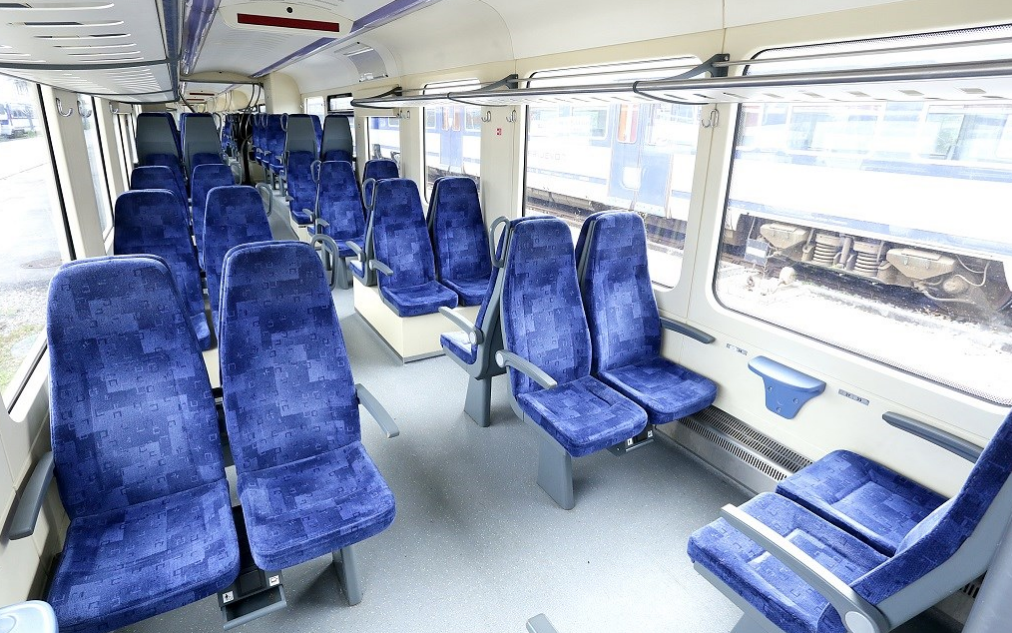
Interior
