= HŽ series 2141 =

HŽ 2141
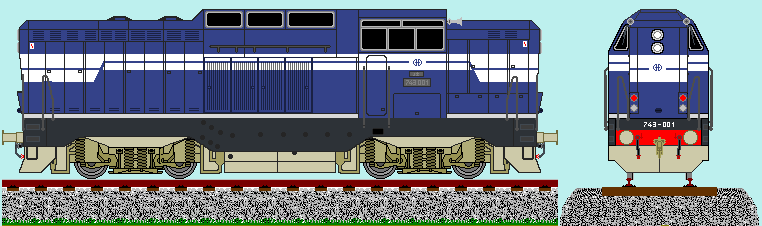
- Series 2141 drawing
Type and origin
- Power type: Diesel-hydraulic
- Builder: Đuro Đaković
- Build date: 1977
- Total produced: 1
Specifications
- Configuration
  - AAR: B-B
  - UIC: B'B'
- Gauge: 1,435 mm (4 ft 8 1/2 in) standard gauge
- Length: 15.34 m (50 ft 4 in)
- Width: 3.18 m (10 ft 5 in)
- Loco weight: 68 tonnes (67 long tons; 75 short tons)
Performance figures
- Maximum speed: Freight: 80 km/h (50 mph); Passenger: 120 km/h (75 mph)
- Power output: 1,600 hp (1,200 kW)
Career
- Locale: Croatia

HŽ series 2141 (formerly JŽ 743) was a prototype diesel shunter locomotive series of the Croatian Railways, built by Đuro Đaković. Only one was produced, but the project was later withdrawn.
