= HŽ series 2043 =

Series 2043
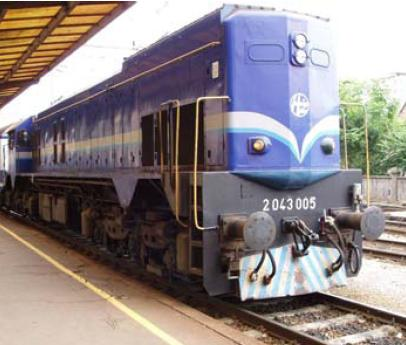
- Series 2043
Type and origin
- Power type: Diesel-electric
- Builder: Electro-Motive Division & TŽV Gredelj
Specifications
- Configuration
  - UIC: (A1A)(A1A)
- Gauge: 1,435 mm (4 ft 8 1/2 in) standard gauge
- Length: 16.994 m (55 ft 9 in)
- Loco weight: c. 100 t (98 long tons; 110 short tons)
- Prime mover: EMD 16-567E
- Engine type: V16 diesel
- Cylinders: 16
Performance figures
- Maximum speed: 124 km/h (77 mph)
- Power output: 1,433 kW (1,922 hp)
Career
- Class: HŽ 2043
- Nicknames: Kramp
- Locale: Croatia

Series 2043 is a diesel-electric locomotive series on Croatian Railways (Croatian: hrvatske željeznice, HŽ).

With the electrification of magistral railway lines the need has arisen that diesel locomotives are put into service on less frequently used lines. Usually lesser axle load is allowed on a branch line and less frequented lines.

A locomotive, which was light and powerful enough was needed.

Therefore, the series 2061 was stripped down and series 2043 was created.

All six locomotives were taken out of service, the last one in 2011. With this the most weight was lost. Now, the adhesion is distributed differently.
