= HŽ series 7021 =

HŽ 7021 (ex JŽ 610)
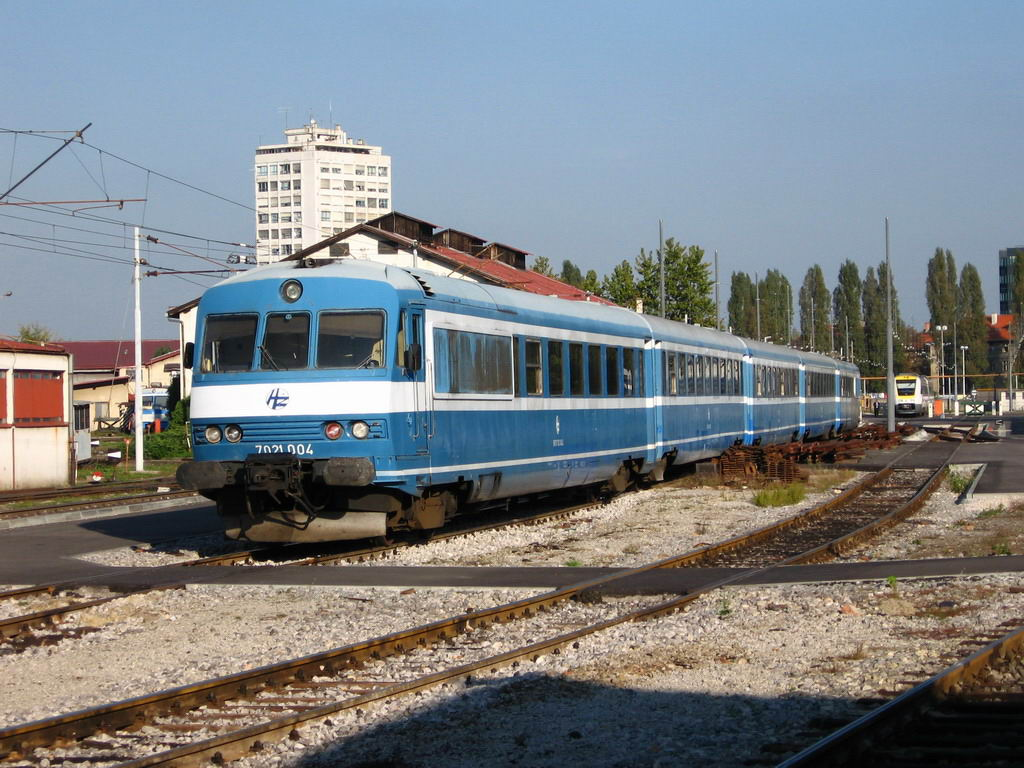
- Croatian 7021 series diesel motor unit
- Manufacturer: Brissonneau et Lotz
- Constructed: 1970–1972
- Entered service: 1972
- Number built: 6 sets
- Formation: 5-car sets (M+P+PB+P+M)

Specifications
- Maximum speed: 120 km/h (75 mph)
- Weight: 233 tonnes (229 long tons; 257 short tons)
- Prime mover(s): MGO - BSHR
- Engine type: V12 diesel
- Cylinder count: 12
- Power output: 2 × 680 kW (910 hp)
- UIC classification: Bo′Bo′+2′2′+2′2′+2′2′+Bo′Bo′
- Track gauge: 1,435 mm (4 ft 8 1/2 in) standard gauge

7021 series was a diesel-motor train on Yugoslav and later Croatian Railways built by French manufacturer Brissonneau and Lotz for Yugoslavia.

== Use ==
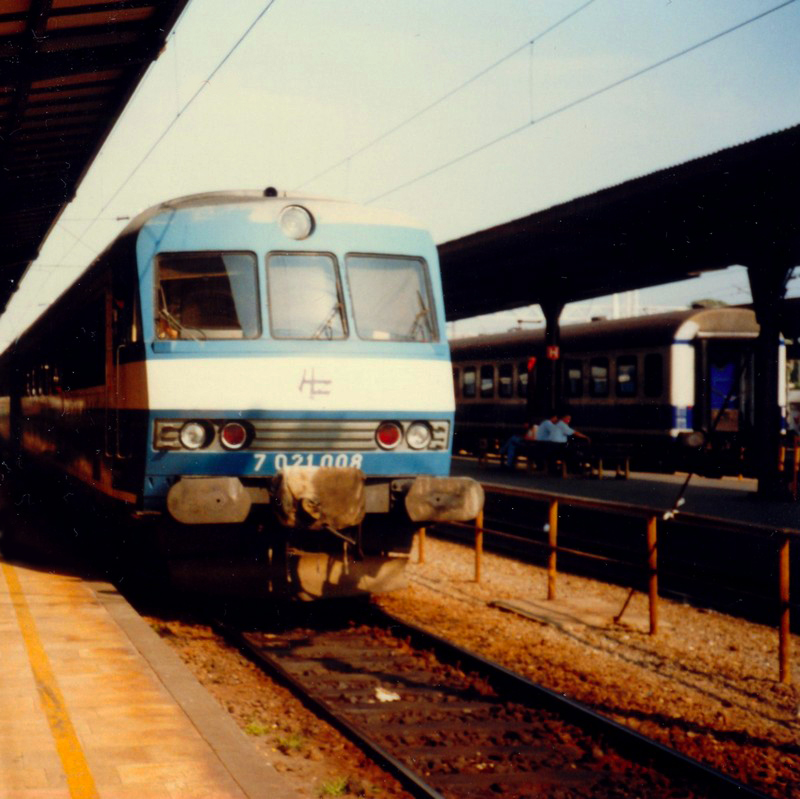
Older photo of a 7021 in Zagreb

This series was used for high quality service travel, covering some of express or fast train lines in Yugoslavia and later in Croatia. It was arguably the most beautiful and most comfortable train on Yugoslavian and later Croatian Railways. The passenger compartment of the train was fully air-conditioned, and each set also included a buffet car.

Their main use in Yugoslavia was on lines Zagreb - Split - Zagreb, Zagreb - Zadar - Zadar - Zagreb, Zagreb - Šibenik - Zagreb and Zagreb - Osijek - Zagreb. They are also well remembered covering inter-city and fast services on the route Zagreb - Zabok - Varaždin - Čakovec - Zagreb, where they have spent the last 10 years of their active career. HŽ series 7 021 was withdrawn from service on January 10, 2005.

== Technical details ==
This was a five-car DMU with two motorcars and three unpowered trailer cars. It used diesel-electric power system. It was also possible to couple and operate two connected DMUs driven from one cab.
