= Renfe Class 321 =

Spanish diesel locomotive class

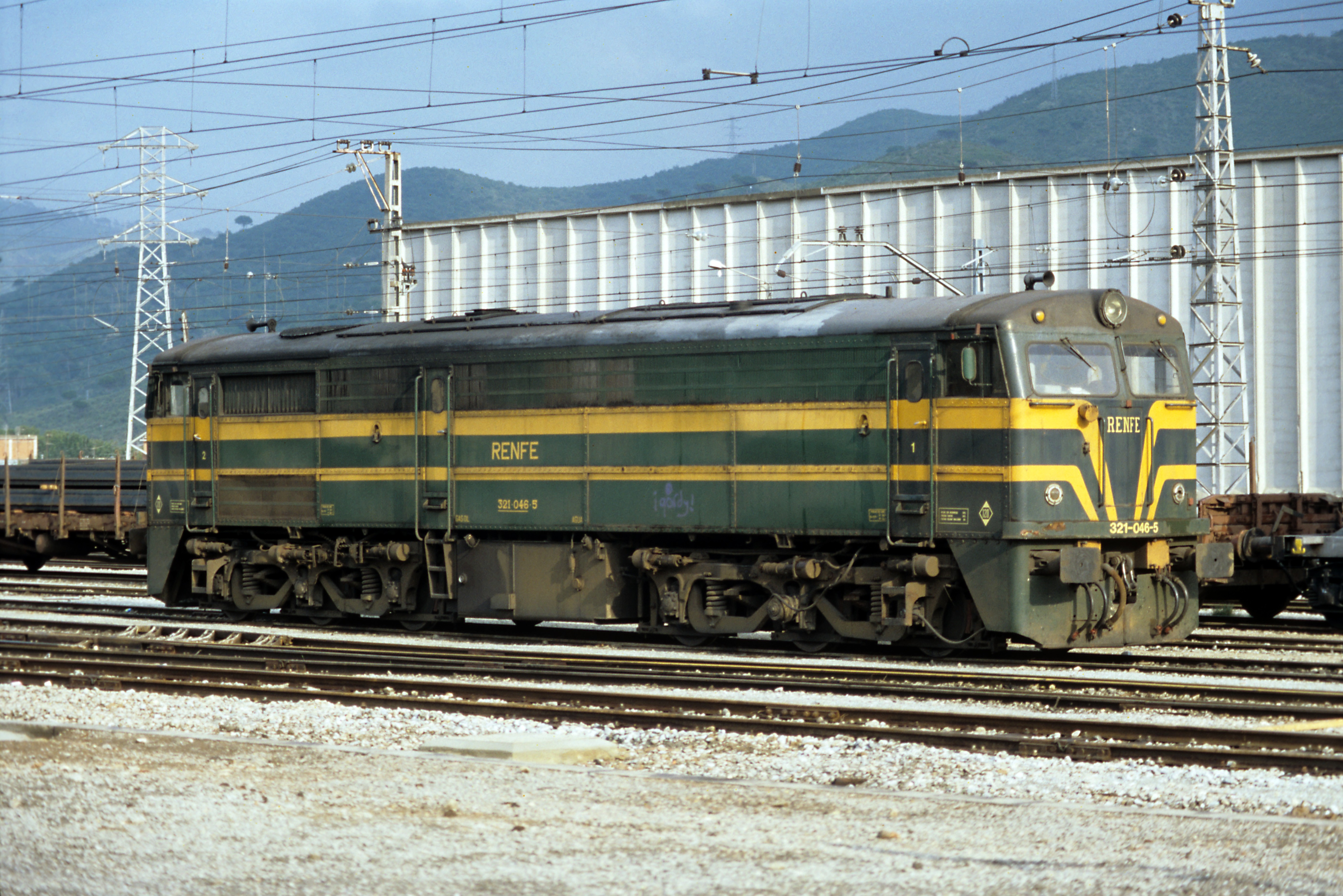
- Locomotive 321 046 in October 1995
Type and origin
- Power type: Diesel-electric
- Designer: American Locomotive Company
- Builder: Alco (8); Euskalduna (72)
- Order number: Alco: 3379
- Serial number: Alco S-3379-01 to S-3379-08
- Model: Alco FPD-9 or DL500S
- Build date: 1965–1971
- Total produced: 80
Specifications
- Configuration
  - AAR: C-C
- Gauge: 1,668 mm (5 ft 5 21/32 in)
- Wheel diameter: 1,016 mm (3 ft 4.0 in)
- Length: 18,567 mm (60 ft 11.0 in)
- Loco weight: 111 t
- Prime mover: Alco 12-251C
- Traction motors: GE 761 (6 off)
Performance figures
- Maximum speed: 120 km/h (75 mph)
- Power output: At flywheel: 2,160 CV (1,590 kW; 2,130 hp); At rail: 1,250 kW (1,676 hp) continuous
Career
- Operators: Renfe, Adif
- Class: Serie 321 de Renfe
- Numbers: 2101 – 2180, later 321-001 – 321-080
- Locale: Spain

The Renfe Class 321 (formerly 2100 series) is a class of diesel-electric locomotives operated by Renfe in Spain, designed by Alco and built by them and by Euskalduna under licence.

== Technical specifications ==
The locomotives have a Co-Co wheel arrangement, and are equipped with GEC 5G-761 engines.

== History ==
Production started in 1965. A total of 80 locomotives were built until 1971, with the first eight built by Alco, and the remaining 72 by Euskalduna. Four locomotives were rebuilt for Teco de Media Distancia freight service trials.

Regular services with Renfe have ended, and some locomotives are used by Adif to haul maintenance trains.

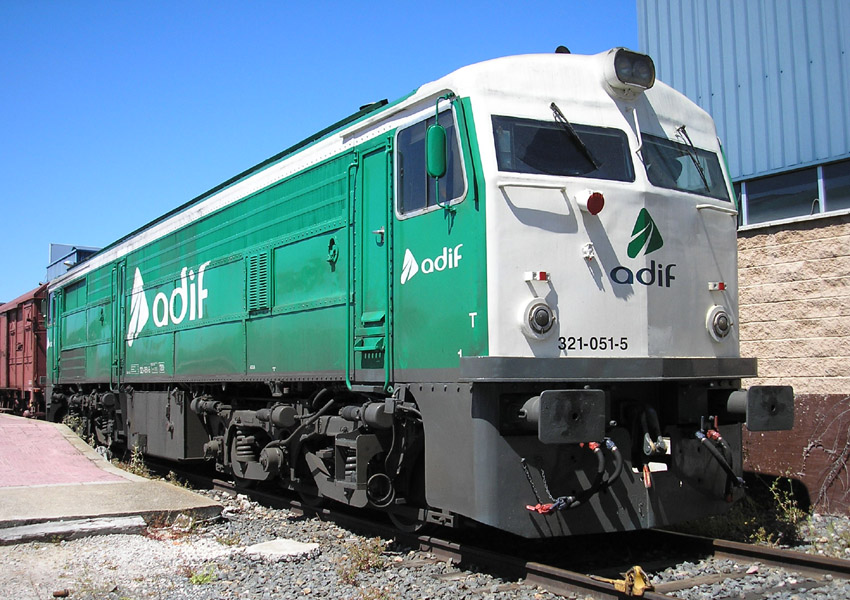
Adif 321 051 in May 2013

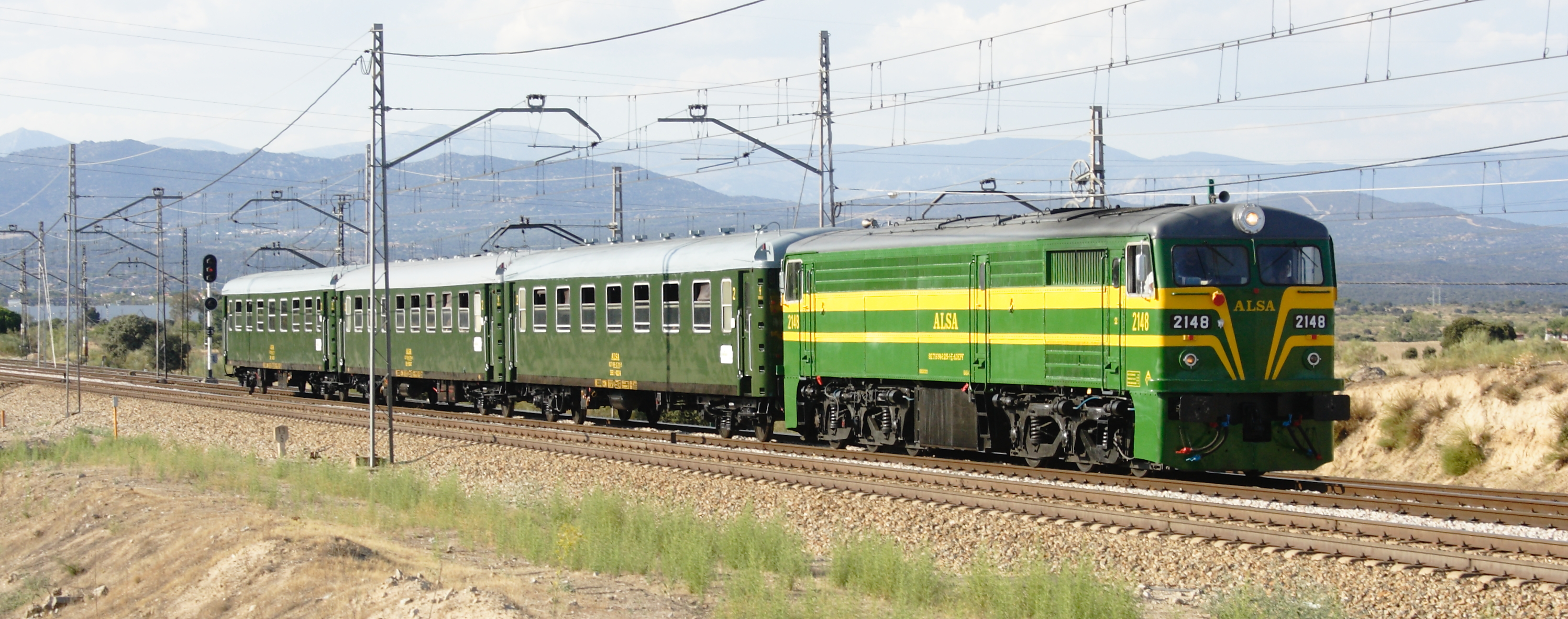
Alsa 321, numbered as 2148, in August 2017
