= Železnici na Republika Severna Makedonija =

Public enterprise for railways in North Macedonia

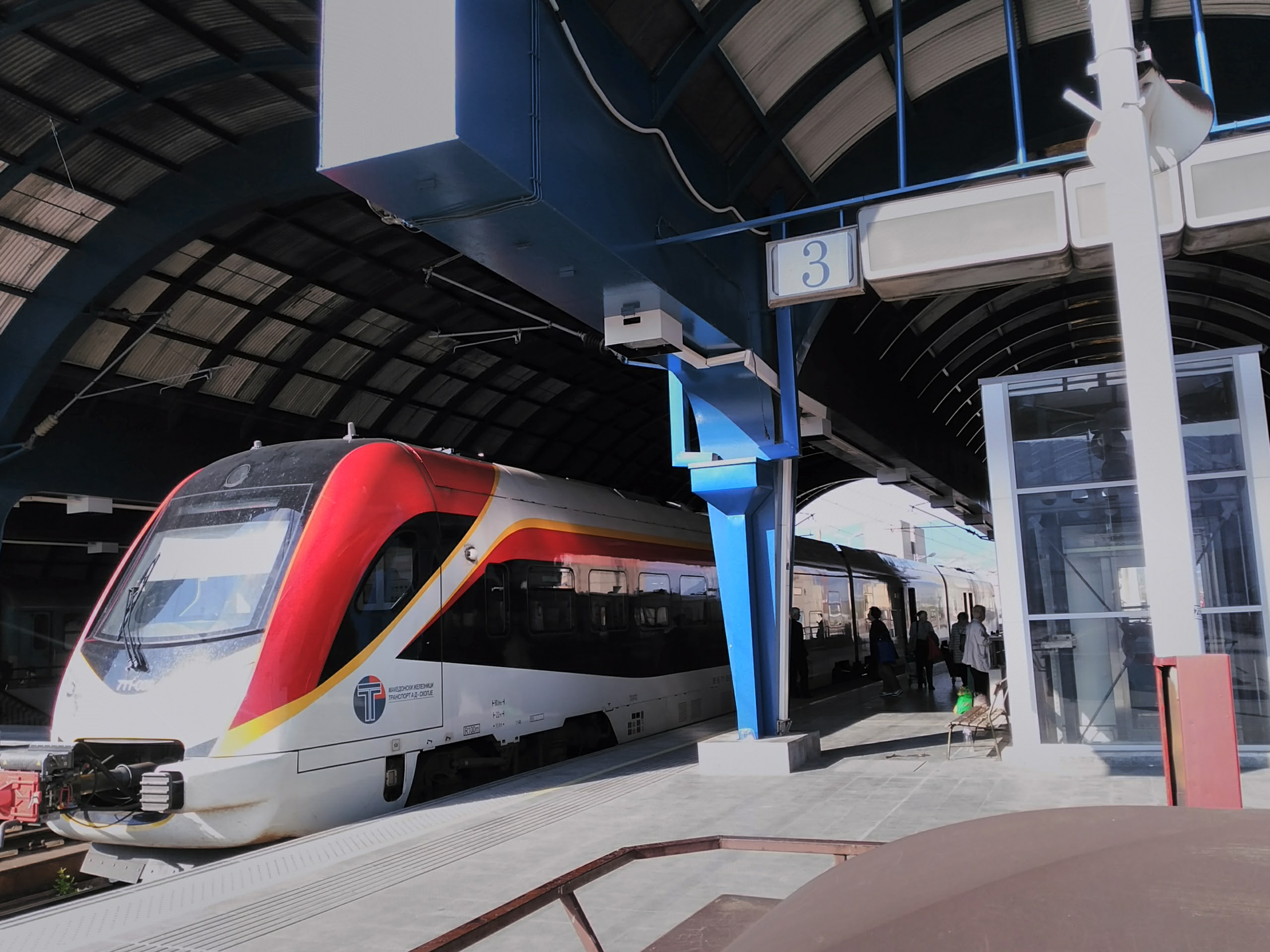
- ŽRSM trains

Operation
- National railway: Železnici na Republika Severna Makedonija
- Infrastructure company: ŽRSM Infrastruktura

Statistics
- Passenger-distance: 154.705.000

System length
- Total: 925 km (575 mi)
- Electrified: 315 km (196 mi)

Track gauge
- Main: 1,435 mm (4 ft 8 1/2 in) standard gauge

Electrification
- Main: 25 kV 50 Hz AC

Features
- No. of stations: 117
Map
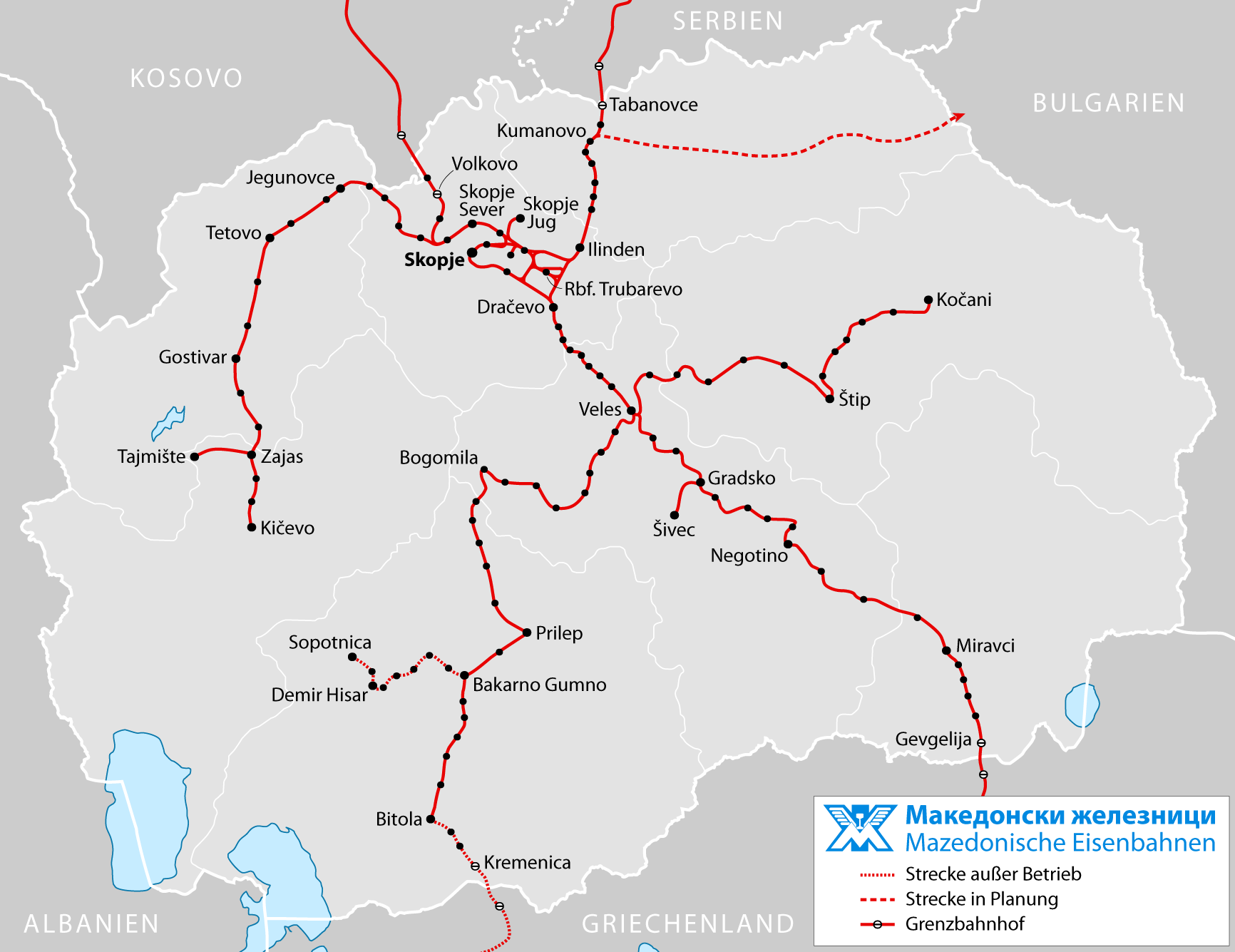

Železnici na Republika Severna Makedonija (ŽRSM; Macedonian: Железници на Република Северна Македонија (ЖРСМ), "Railways of the Republic of North Macedonia") was the public enterprise for railways in North Macedonia. In 2007 it was split into railway operation company ŽRSM Transport and the infrastructure company ŽRSM Infrastruktura.

North Macedonia is a member of the International Union of Railways (UIC). The UIC Country Code for North Macedonia is 65.

ŽRSM operates 1,435 mm (4 ft 8 1/2 in) standard gauge rail tracks in North Macedonia and maintains 925 km (575 mi) of lines, 315 km (196 mi) of which are electrified with the 25 kV 50 Hz AC system.

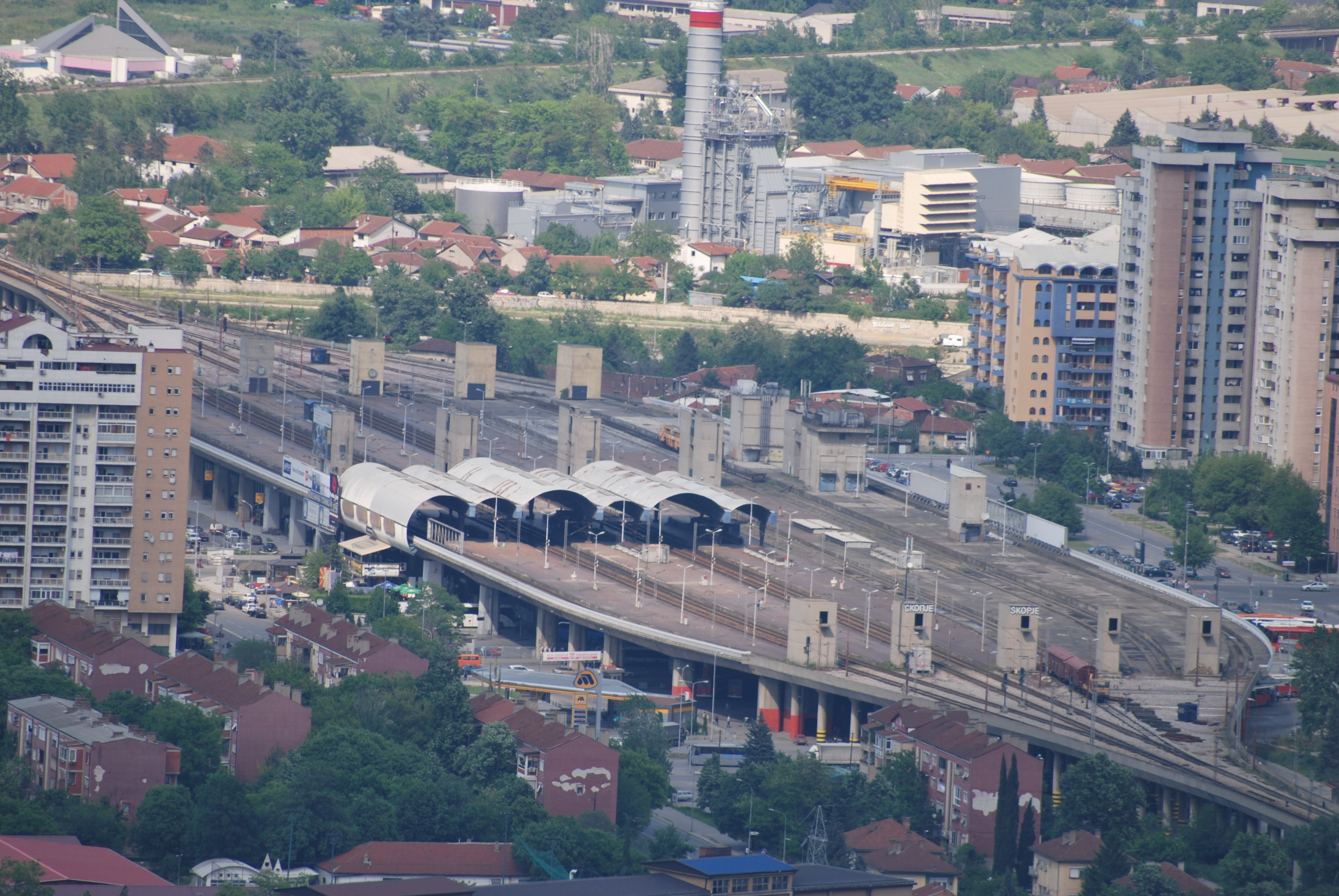

== Trains ==
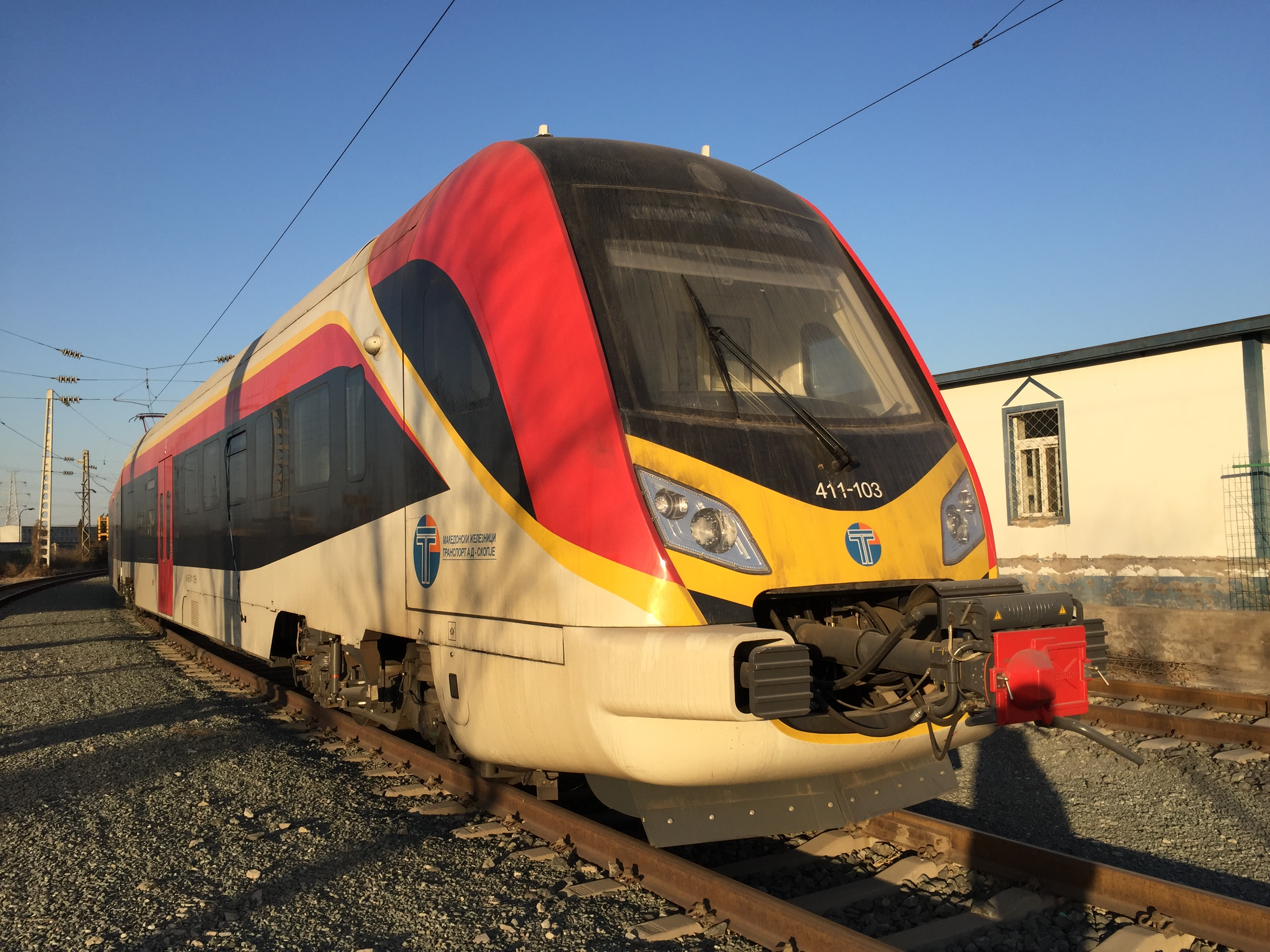

ŽRSM Transport operates a large number of train sets, which consist of passenger trains (diesel and electric trains) and freight trains.

A contract for the purchase of 6 new passenger train sets, manufactured by China's CRRC Corporation at the Zhuzhou Electric Locomotive Works, was signed in 2014. The first train-set arrived in August 2015. Each train consists of 3 rail cars, and is designed to carry 200 passengers. They will be used on routes from Skopje to Bitola, Gevgelija, Kičevo, Kumanovo, and Veles. This is the first time North Macedonia has bought new passenger trains since its independence, and the first time a Chinese EMU or DMU manufacturer has entered the European market.

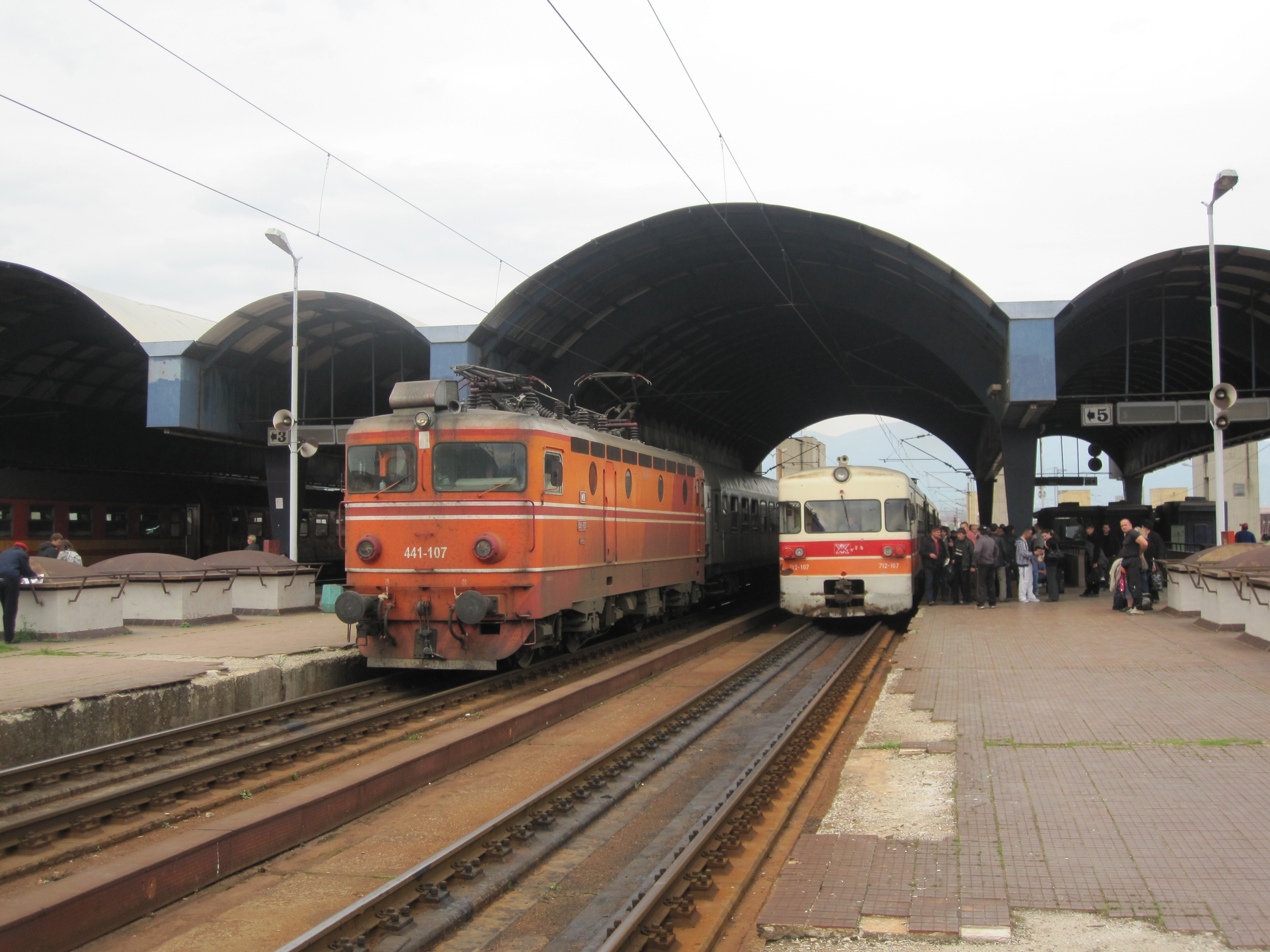

== Overview ==
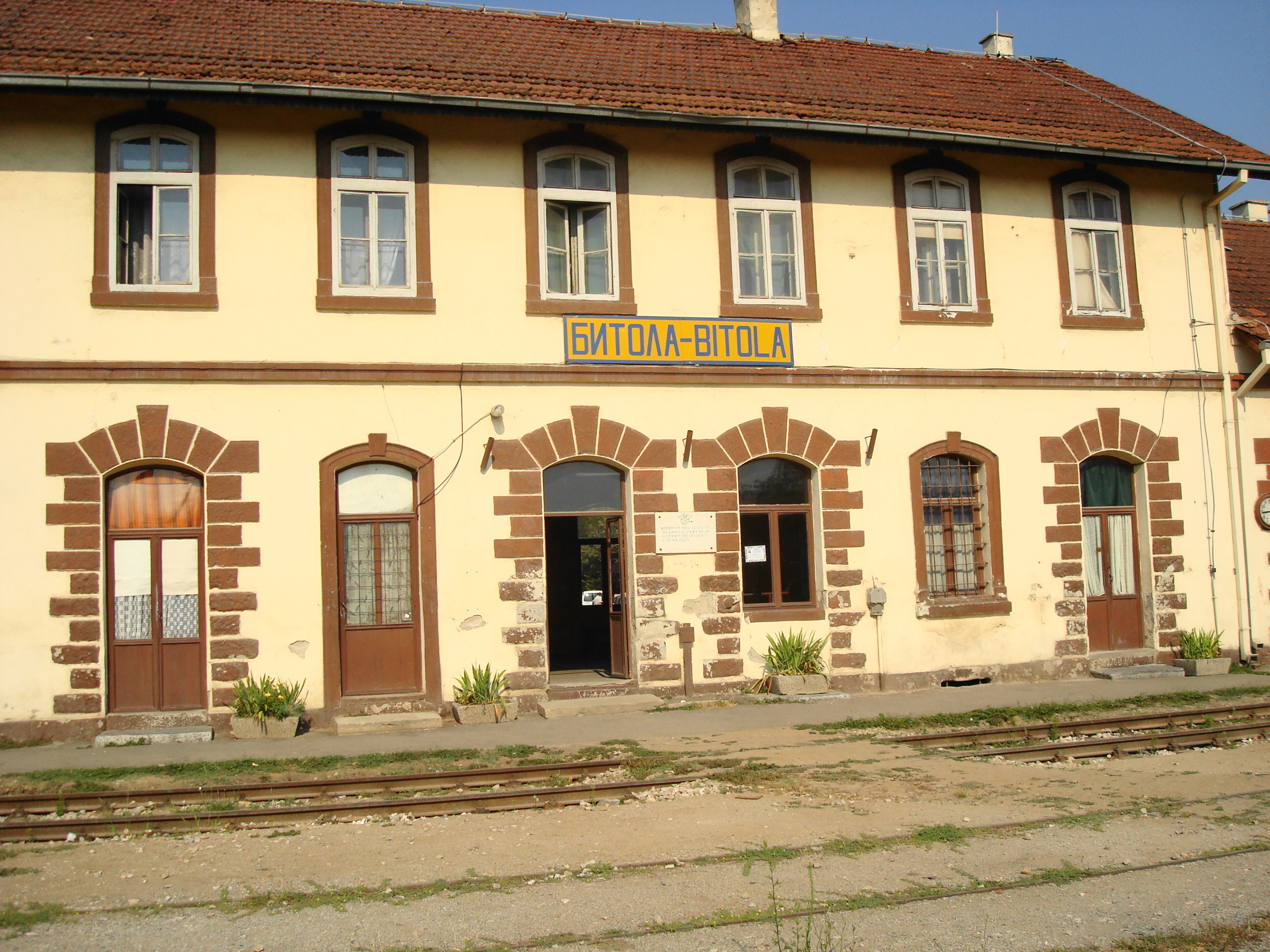
The train station in Bitola

The first standard gauge line in the area, from Skopje to Thessaloniki was built in 1873 during Ottoman rule.

North Macedonia has a well-developed railroad system. It is connected to Kosovo via Volkovo in the northwest, to Serbia via Tabanovci in the north and to Greece via Gevgelija in the southeast and via Kremenica in the southwest. North Macedonia's main rail line between the Serbian and Greek borders, from Tabanovci to Gevgelija, is entirely electrified.

The railway company has its headquarters in the capital Skopje. The original city railway station was partially destroyed in the 1963 earthquake and now houses the Museum of the City of Skopje. The new principal railway station forms the upper level of the integrated Transportation Center Skopje.

All domestic lines are operated by ŽRSM, with links from Skopje to Tetovo, Gostivar and Kicevo in the west, to Volkovo in the northwest, to Kumanovo and Tabanovci in the north, to Sveti Nikole, Štip, and Kocani in the east, to Veles, Negotino and Gevgelija in the south - southeast and to Bogomila, Prilep and Bitola in the southwest.

According to a local journalists' report dated 2011, passenger service within the country is quite slow, and trains and stations are often poorly maintained. Nonetheless, the inexpensive rail service is well patronized, and on occasions trains are standing-room only.

In April 2023, commemorating 150 year since the arrival of the first train in today's North Macedonia, the Museum of Macedonian Railways was opened in Skopje.

== Rolling stock ==
=== Electric Locomotives ===
Designation	Producer	Total units	Power output(kwh)	Wheel arrangement	Top speed	Building years	Notes	Image
MŽ 441	Rade Končar Zagreb	8	3800 kW	Bo'Bo'	120 km/h (140 km/h)	1969–1988		
MŽ 442	Rade Končar Zagreb	3	3800 kW	Bo'Bo'	120 km/h (140 km/h)	2001	Series 442 was obtained by restoring and thyristorizing of 3 former HŽ 1141 locomotives.	
MŽ 443	CRRC Zhuzhou Locomotive	4	4800 kW	Bo'Bo'	120 km/h	2019		
MŽ 461	Electroputere	3	5100 kW	Co'Co'	120 km/h	1972–1980		
MŽ 462	Rade Končar Zagreb	2	5100 kW	Co'Co'	120 km/h	2008	Series 462 was obtained by restoring and thyristorizing of 2 MŽ 461 locomotives.	

=== Diesel Locomotives ===
Designation	Producer	Total units	Type	Power output in kwh	Wheel arrangement	Top speed	Building years	Image
MŽ 642	Brissonneau et Lotz; Đuro Đaković Slavonski Brod	8	Diesel electric shunter	606 kW	Bo'Bo'	80 km/h	1960–1964	
MŽ 643	Brissonneau et Lotz; Đuro Đaković Slavonski Brod	3	Diesel electric shunter	680 kW	Bo'Bo'	80 km/h	1967	
MŽ 661	GM-EMD; Đuro Đaković Slavonski Brod	23	Diesel electric	1454 kW	Co'Co'	114 km/h (124 km/h)	1960–1971	

=== Electric Multiple Units ===
Designation	Producer	Total units	Power output in kwh	Wheel arrangement	Top speed	Building years	Image
MŽ 412	Rīgas Vagonbūves Rūpnīca	3	1360 kW	Bo'Bo'+2'2'+2'2'+Bo'Bo'	130 km/h	1985–1986's	
MŽ 411	Zhuzhou Electric Locomotive Co., Ltd.	2		Bo'2'+2'Bo'	160 km/h	2015–2016's	

=== Diesel Multiple Units ===
Designation	Producer	Total units	Power output in kwh	Wheel arrangement	Top speed	Building years	Image
MŽ 712	MACOSA	20	2x 210 kW	B'B'+2'2'+2'2'	120 km/h	1981–1986	
MŽ 711	Zhuzhou Electric Locomotive Co., Ltd.	4		Bo'2'+2'Bo'	160 km/h	2015–2016	

== International connections and services ==
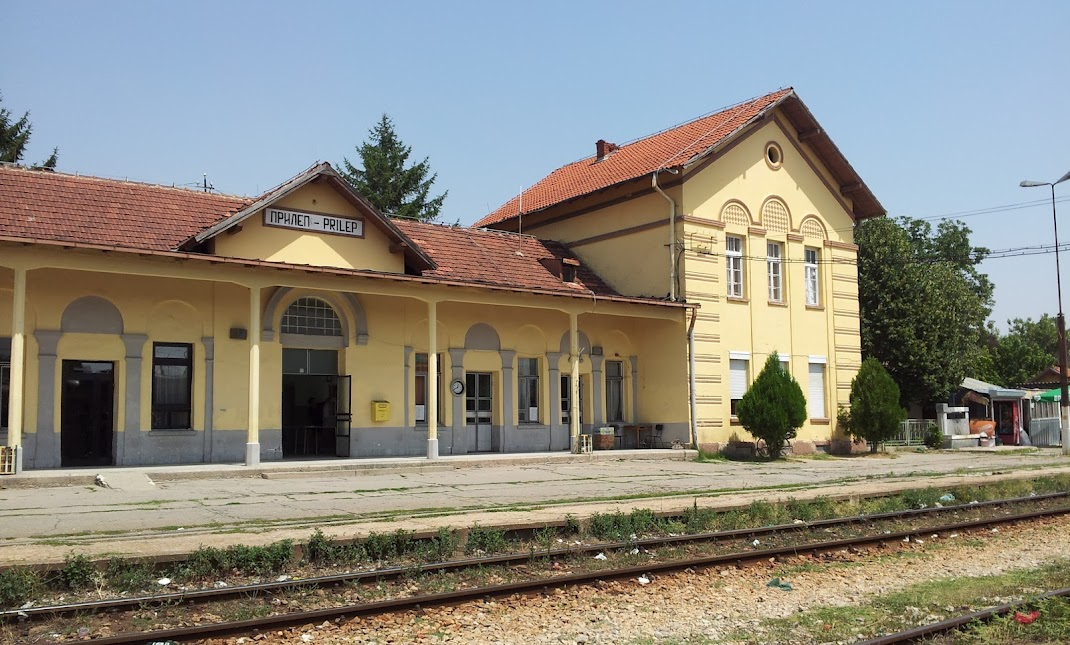
The train station in Prilep

The main north–south line from Niš in Serbia to the port of Thessaloniki in Greece on the Aegean Sea (Corridor X), passes through Kumanovo, Skopje, Zelenikovo, Veles, Negotino, Demir Kapija, Miravci and Gevgelija.

Intercity trains link Kumanovo, Skopje, Zelenikovo, Veles, Negotino (Kavadarci), Demir Kapija, Miravci (Valandovo) and Gevgelija (Bogdanci) with Serbian Railways and Greek railways.

Connections to Bulgarian State Railways are via Niš in Serbia and via Thessaloniki in Greece.

Intercity trains from Kosovo Railways link Skopje with Pristina.

In 2010, Makedonski Železnici joined Cargo 10, a joint venture with other railways in the region.

== Plans ==
=== Corridor VIII ===
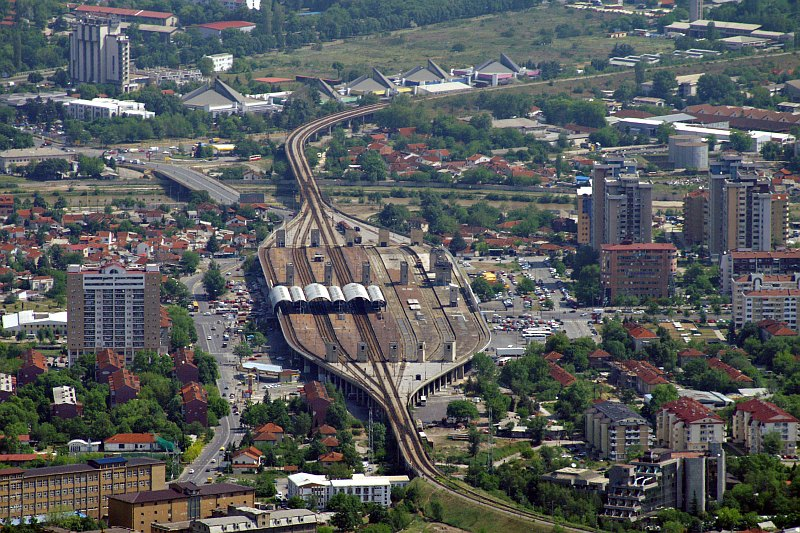
The railway station forms part of the Transportation Center Skopje

In July 2022 a contract was signed involving modernisation and construction works on the:

- Kumanovo – Beljakovce and the Beljakovce – Kriva Palanka lines which would connect North Macedonia to Varna (Bulgaria) and to the Black Sea. A tender for a new 23.4 km of track to include 22 tunnels and 52 bridges was offered in January 2024.

A proposal from 2020 for:

- A 66 km (41 mi) link in the West, from Kičevo to the Albanian border, which would connect North Macedonia to Durrës (Albania) and to the Adriatic Sea.

=== Corridor X ===
The Ministry of Transport and Communication has begun studies for the renewal and reconstruction of several section of the corridor X:

- Renewal and reconstruction of railway track on the 16 km (9.9 mi) section between Bitola and Kremenica as a part of the Xd branch of Corridor X
- Reconstruction of the 14 km (8.7 mi) railway section between Kumanovo and Deljadrovci
- Reconstruction of the 35 km (22 mi) railway section between Dračevo and Veles

High speed railway:

- A 50km section of the corridor X, Skopje-Niš, Serbia-Belgrade to be upgraded to operate high speed trains.
