= SNCF Class BB 63000 =

BB 63000
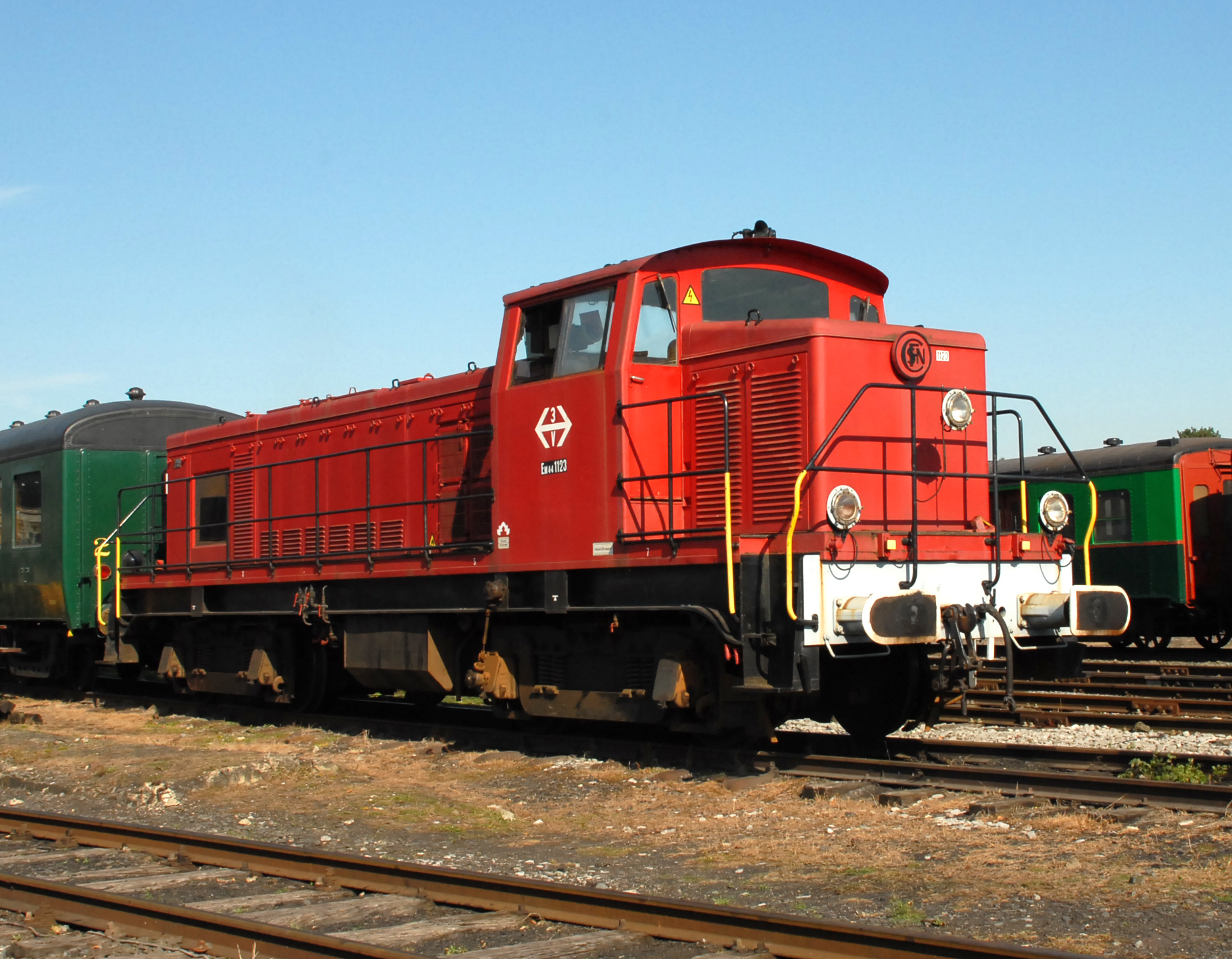
- SBB (ex-SNCF) BB 63123
Type and origin
- Power type: Diesel-electric
- Builder: Brissonneau et Lotz
- Build date: 1953–1964
- Total produced: 349
Specifications
- Configuration
  - AAR: B-B
  - UIC: Bo′Bo′
- Gauge: 1,435 mm (4 ft 8 1/2 in)
- Wheel diameter: 1,050 mm (41 in)
- Length: 14.68 m (48.2 ft)
- Loco weight: 64–69 t (63–68 long tons; 71–76 short tons)
- Prime mover: Sulzer 6LDA22
- Transmission: Electric
Performance figures
- Maximum speed: 80 km/h (50 mph)
- Power output: 440–550 kW (590–740 hp)
- Tractive effort: 167 kN (38,000 lb_{f})
Career
- Operators: SNCF; Renfe; CP; CFL; JŽ
- Number in class: 250; 10; 25; 21; 43
- Numbers: BB 63001–BB 63250

The BB 63000 is a diesel-powered centre cab freight shunting locomotive used by French rail operator SNCF. First introduced in 1953, various batches, with increasingly more powerful engines, were built up till 1964. Along with its successors, classes BB 63400 and BB 63500, together totalling over 800 locomotives, it could be found all over France.

== Construction ==
The first batch of 72 locomotives, numbered BB 63001–BB 63072, were powered by Sulzer 6LDA22B engines developing 440 kW (590 hp). The second batch of 36 locomotives, BB 63073–BB 63108, received the 6LDA22C also rated at 440 kW (590 hp). The third batch was introduced in 1959 and consisted of 20 locomotives, BB 63109–BB 63128, had the same engine but uprated to 535 kW (717 hp). The next 87 locomotives, BB 63129–BB 63195, had the 6LDA22D, rated at 535 kW (717 hp). The final batch of 55 locomotives, BB 63196–BB 63250, was introduced in 1962 fitted with the 6LDA22E of 550 kW (740 hp). The locomotives were 14.68 m (48.2 ft) long and weighed 64–69 t (63–68 long tons; 71–76 short tons).

== Exports ==
Further examples were built for Spain as Renfe Class 307, in Portugal as Class 1200, in Luxembourg as Classes 850/900 and licence built in the former Yugoslavia by Đuro Đaković as Yugoslav Railways Class 642/643. The latter are now operated by Croatian Railways as Classes 2041 and 2042.

== Preservation ==
Two examples of the class have been preserved at the Chemin de Fer à vapeur des Trois Vallées at Mariembourg, BB 63123 and BB 63149.
