= Rolling stock of the Slovenian Railways =

Slovenian Railways (Slovene: Slovenske železnice) is the state railway company of Slovenia.

== Electric multiple units ==
| Class | Image | Build year | Quantity | Producer | Power output in kW | Notes |
|---|---|---|---|---|---|---|
| 310/316 | | 2000 | 3 | Fiat Ferroviaria | 1960 | Driving cars numbered 310. Centre cars numbered 316. |
| 312/317 | | 2000–2002 | 30 (10x two car 20x three car) | Siemens | 1650 (two car) 2000 (three car) | Driving cars numbered 312. Centre cars numbered 317. |
| 510/515 | | 2020–2022 | 21 | Stadler | 1600 | Also capable of running cross-border services to Austria, as well as Croatia and Villa Opicina (Italy). |
| 313/318 | | 2021 | 10 | Stadler | 2000 | New double-deck electric trains for domestic routes. |

== Diesel multiple units ==
| Class | Image | Build year | Quantity | Producer | Power output in kW | Notes |
|---|---|---|---|---|---|---|
| 813/814 | | 1973-1976 | 20 | Fiat Ferroviaria | 147 | Motor cars numbered 813. Trailer cars numbered 814. Largely replaced by series 610/615. |
| 713/715 | | 1983-1986 | 10 | MBB/TVT Boris Kidrič | 357 | Motor cars numbered 713. Trailer cars numbered 715. Largely replaced by series 610/615. |
| 711 | | 1970 | 2 | MBB | 640 | Retired from regular service in 2026, replaced by series 610/615. |
| 610/615 | | 2020-2022 | 21 | Stadler | 1000 | An additional 20 units to replace other older diesel units will be delivered in 2025. |

== Diesel locomotives ==
| Class | Image | Build year | Quantity | Producer | Power output in kW | Notes |
|---|---|---|---|---|---|---|
| 642 | | 1961-1972 | 12 | Đuro Đaković, Brissonneau et Lotz | 606 | Built under license. |
| 643 | | 1967-1978 | 21 | Đuro Đaković, Brissonneau et Lotz | 680 | Built under license. |
| 646 | | 2020 | 4 | CZ Loko | 895 | In use in Koper freight train station. |
| 644 | | 1973-1973 | 2 | MACOSA | 1230 | Built under license. |
| 661 | | 1973 | 1 | General Motors | 1435 | Built under license. |
| 664 | | 1974-1986 | 6 | Đuro Đaković | 1640 | Built under license. |

== Electric locomotives ==
| Class | Image | Build year | Quantity | Producer | Power output in kW | Notes |
|---|---|---|---|---|---|---|
| 342 | | 1968-1970 | 8 | Ansaldo | 1760 | |
| 363 | | 1975-1977 | 38 | Alstom | 2750 | |
| 541 | | 2005-2007 2009 | 32 | Siemens | 6400 | |
| 542 | | | 30 | Alstom | 6400 | |
