= Eurofima coach =

Class of European railway coach

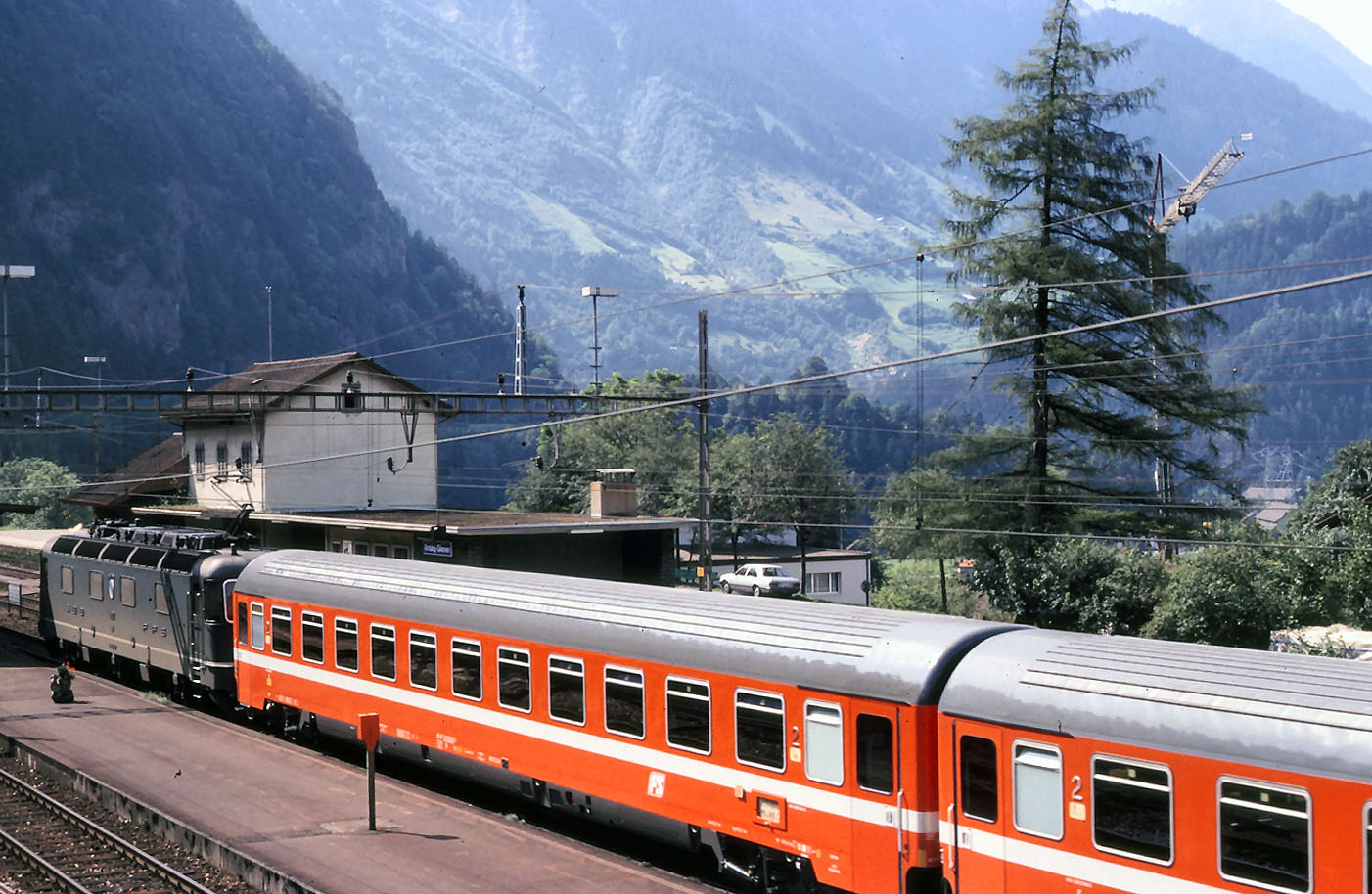
FS Eurofima coaches

The Eurofima coach (French: Voiture Standard Européenne, VSE) is a standard passenger coach developed for international railway services in Europe. It was commissioned by the European Company for the Financing of Railroad Rolling Stock (French: Société européenne pour le financement de matériel ferroviaire).

Overall production was 10 prototypes, followed by 500 coaches ordered in 1973 and delivered in 1977 to the following railway companies:

- Austrian Federal Railways (ÖBB): 25 Amoz and 75 Bmoz;
- Deutsche Bundesbahn (DB): 100 Avmz 207 first class;
- Ferrovie dello Stato (FS): 30 Az and 70 Bz;
- French National Railway Corporation (SNCF): 100 A9u;
- National Railway Company of Belgium (NMBS-SNCB): 20 A9 and 60 B11;
- Swiss Federal Railways (SBB-CFF-FFS): 20 Am 61 85 19–90.
