= 1200 class =

1200 class or Class 1200 may refer to:

- CP Class 1200, diesel-electric locomotives
- LRTA 1200 class, Manila light-rail vehicles
- New South Wales 1200 class railcar
- NS Class 1200, electric locomotives
- Queensland Railways 1200 class, diesel-electric locomotives
