= Željeznički prevoz Crne Gore =

Montenegro railway company

Railway transport of Montenegro Жељезнички превоз Црне Горе
- Type: Government-owned
- Industry: Rail Transport
- Founded: 2008
- Headquarters: Podgorica, Montenegro
- Services: Rail Transport, Services
- Operating income: 9 457 317 € (2021)
- Net income: 866 987 € (2021)
- Total assets: 33 394 172 € (2021)
- Number of employees: 366 (2021)
- Website: Official website

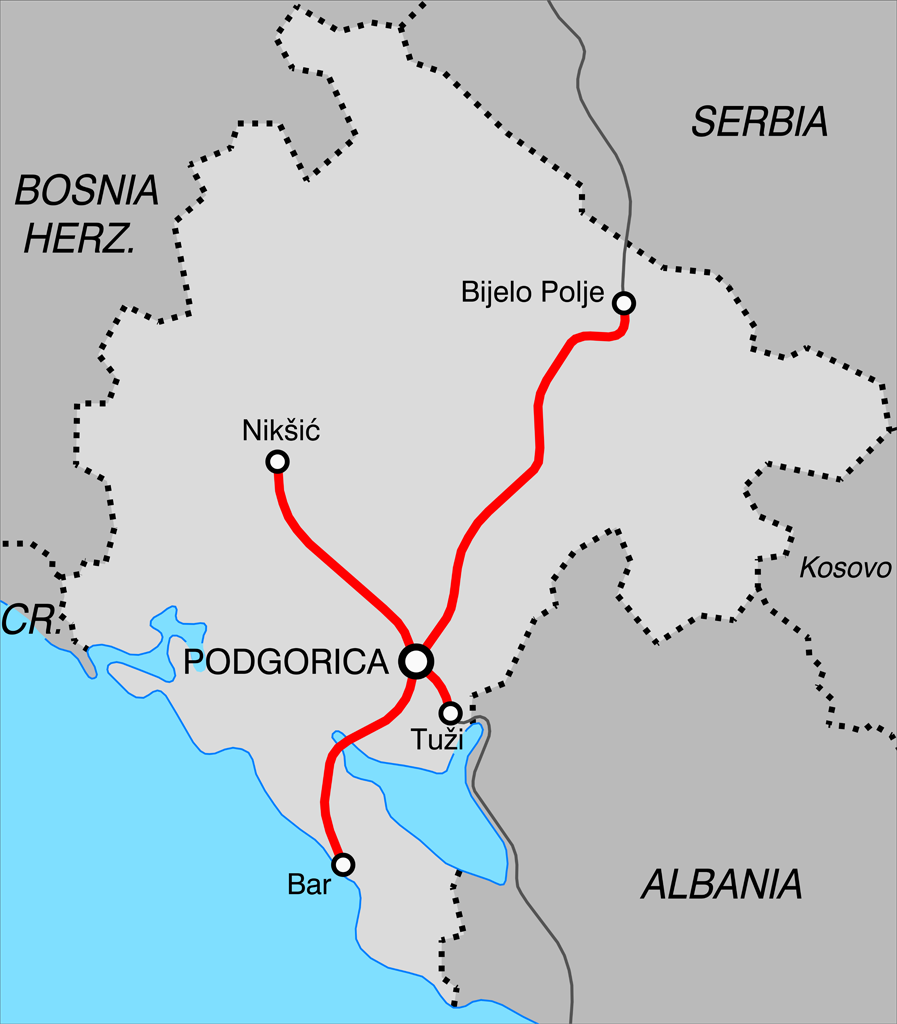
Railroads of Montenegro

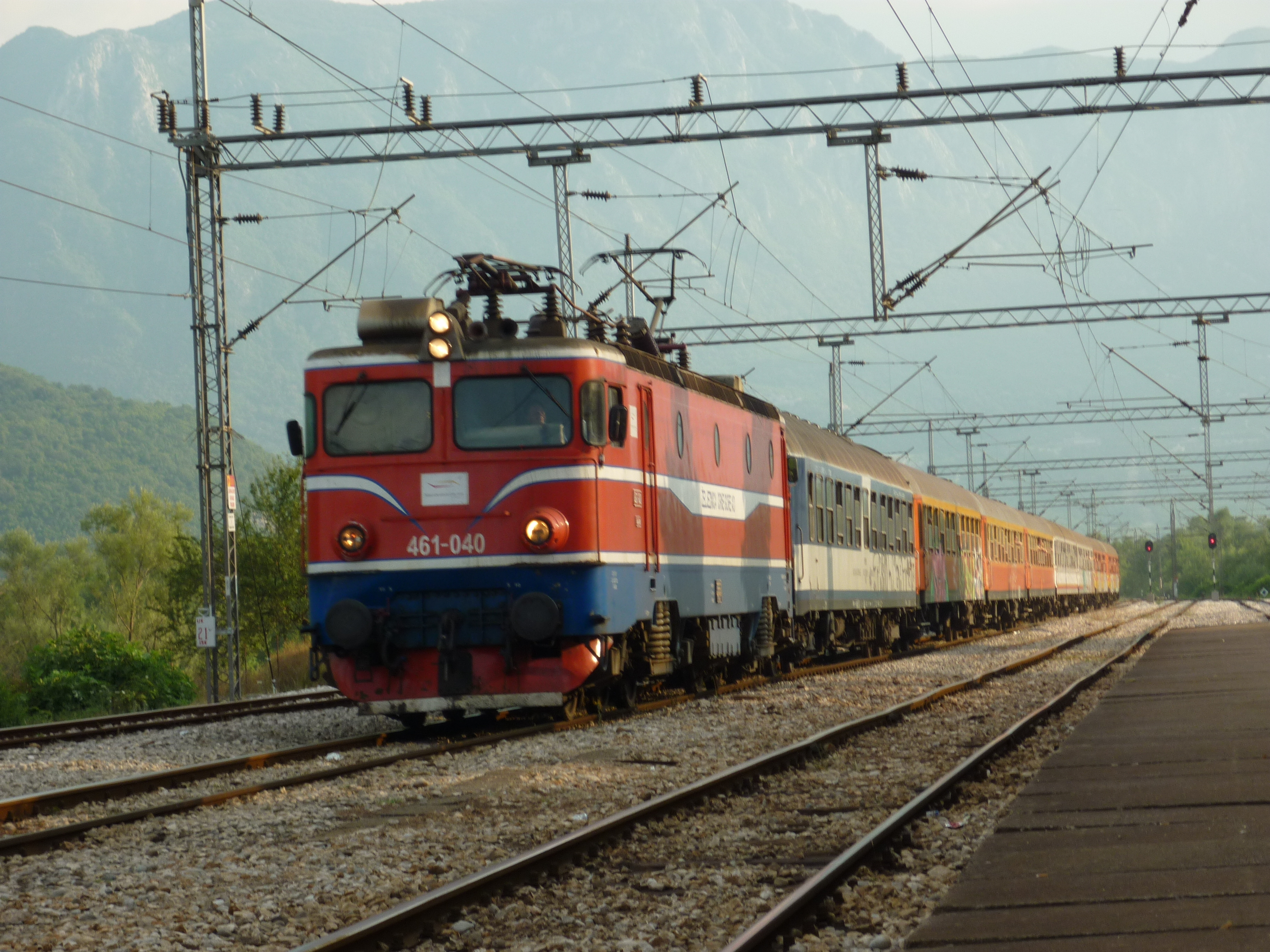
Former JŽ class 461 passing through Virpazar on the Belgrade-Bar line.

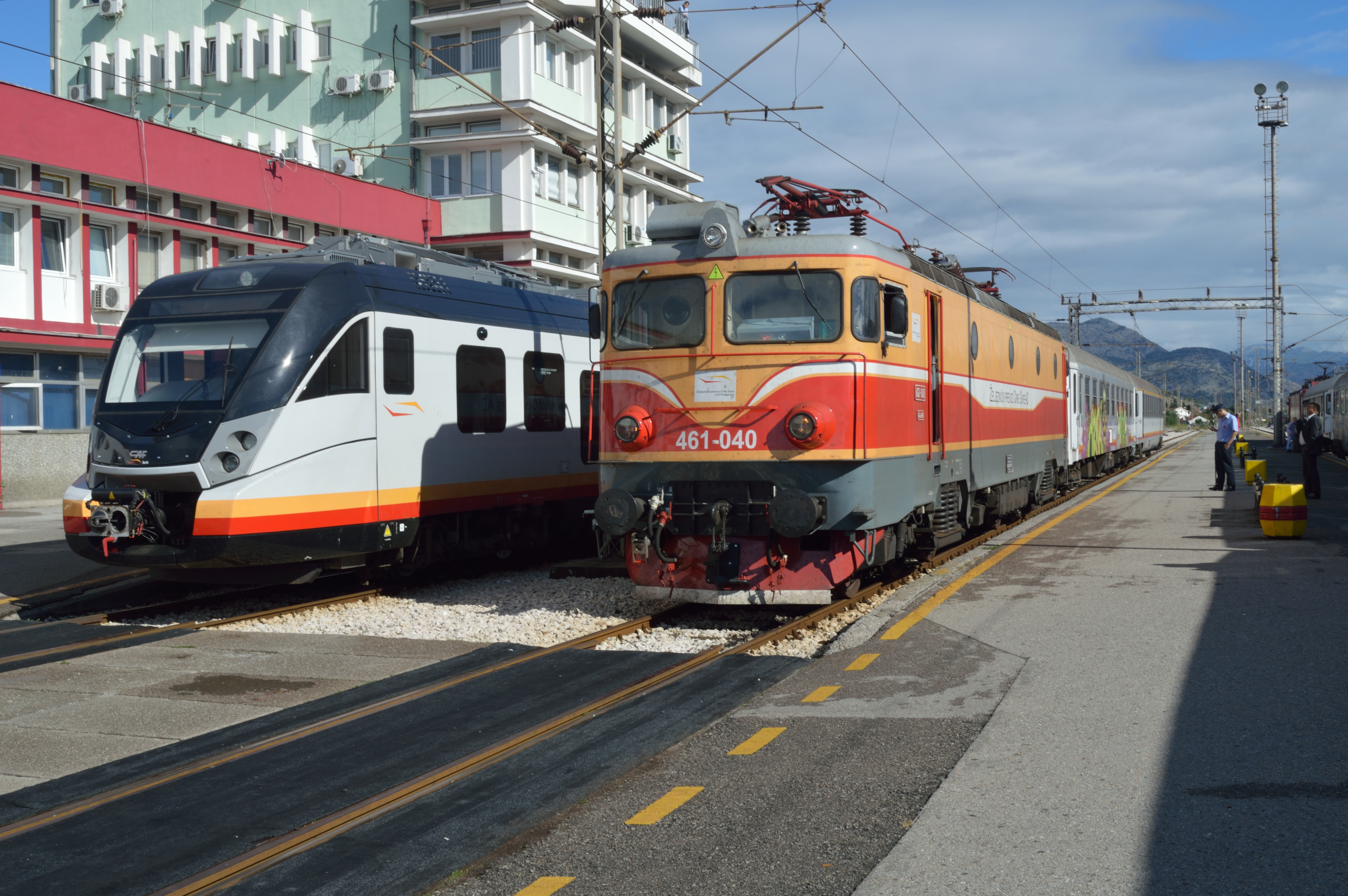
New CAF Civity next to passenger train hauled by older former JŽ class 461.

Željeznički prevoz Crne Gore (ŽPCG) (Cyrillic: Жељезнички превоз Црне Горе; English: Railway transport of Montenegro) is a joint-stock company that handles passenger transport within Montenegro, as well as operation of the Montenegrin rolling stock.

== Rolling stock ==
Rolling stock of Railway transport of Montenegro consists of 39 locomotives and 5 EMUs:

=== Locomotives ===
Class	Image	Type	Top speed		Number	Built	Builder	Notes
Class	Image	Type	mph	km/h	Number	Built	Builder	Notes
JŽ 461		Electric	75	120	10	1971-1980	Electroputere	Built for JŽ originally.
JŽ 661		Diesel	77	124	7	1958 - 1972	EMD	Built for JŽ originally. 2 active, 2 are awaiting overhaul.

Diesel locomotives

- 4 locomotives of JŽ series 644
- 4 locomotives of JŽ series 642 (2 active)
- 2 locomotives of JŽ series 643
- 6 locomotives of JŽ series 744 (none of them is active)

=== Multiple units ===
Class	Image	Type	Top speed		Number	Built	Builder	Notes
Class	Image	Type	mph	km/h	Number	Built	Builder	Notes
JŽ 412/416		EMU	75	120	6	1980-1990	RVR	4 carriages. Built for JŽ originally.
Civity 6111		EMU	75	120	3	2013	CAF	3 carriages. Built for Podgorica-Nikšić-railway to cut travel times to 50 minutes. Train length 59,2 meters. Capacity 354 passengers.
FLIRT		EMU	100	160	3	2028	Stadler	4 carriages. On order. Contract signed in 2026.

On 27th May 2026, ŽPCG and Stadler Rail signed a contract to deliver 3 four-car FLIRT EMUs. The trains will be largely similar to Stadler FLIRT units currently operating in Serbia and are intended to enable cross-border transport between the two countries.

=== Passenger cars ===
Railway transport of Montenegro also has following inventory of passenger cars:

- 31 passenger coaches (classes A, AB and B)
- 1 buffet car (class WR)
- 32 sleeping and couchette cars (classes AcBc, Ac, Bc and WLAB)
- 10 car-carrier wagons (class DDam)

=== Freight cars ===
Freight cars in inventory are as follows:

- 226 wagons (class G)
- 15 wagons (class K)
- 62 wagons (class R)
- 7 wagons (class S)
- 415 wagons (class E)
- 29 wagons (class F)
- 34 wagons (class Z)
- 33 wagons (class U)
- 3 wagons (class H)

== See also ==
- Transport in Montenegro
- Rail transport in Montenegro
