= Joseph of Kumanovo and Osogovo =

Macedonian bishop

Joseph M.D.
- Metropolitan of Kumanovo and Osogovo
- Church: Macedonian
- Province: Kumanovo, Kriva Palanka, Kratovo
- Metropolis: Kumanovo
- Diocese: Kumanovo and Osogovo
- See: Skopje
- Elected: September 17, 2013
- Installed: October 10, 2013
- Predecessor: none (Kiril as Metropolitan of Diocese of Polog and Kumanovo)
- Successor: incumbent

Personal details
- Born: 1977 (age 48–49) Prilep (Socialist Federal Republic of Yugoslavia) Yugoslavia
- Denomination: Eastern Orthodoxy
- Residence: Kumanovo
- Occupation: Metropolitan of MOC-OA
- Education: Skopje University

Dr. Joseph Pејоvsky (Macedonian: Јосиф Пејовски) is the first and current Metropolitan bishop of the Diocese of Kumanovo and Osogovo of the Macedonian Orthodox Church.

== Schooling ==
Metropolitan Josif in 1995 enrolled at the Faculty of Theology “St Clement of Ohrid” in Skopje, where in 2000 earned a bachelor's degree with thesis topic “The Icons in the History of the Church”. In 2009, he completed his doctoral studies dissertation with the topic “Dogmatic-theological doctrine of hesychasm in the works of St John Climacus, St Symeon the New Theologian, and Gregory Palamas”.

== See also ==
- Diocese of Kumanovo and Osogovo
- List of Metropolitans of Diocese of Kumanovo and Osogovo
- Diocese of Polog and Kumanovo
- Kiril of Polog and Kumanovo
- Macedonian Orthodox Church – Ohrid Archbishopric
- Kumanovo

Eastern Orthodox Church titles
Preceded by Kiril as Metropolitan of Polog and Kumanovo	Metropolitan of Kumanovo and Osogovo; 2013–present	Incumbent
