= Kiril of Polog and Kumanovo =

Kiril
- Metropolitan of Polog and Kumanovo
- Church: Macedonian Orthodox Church
- Diocese: Polog and Kumanovo
- See: Skopje
- Installed: 1971
- Quashed: 2013
- Predecessor: unknown
- Successor: Joseph of Kumanovo and Osogovo; Joseph of Tetovo and Gostivar

Personal details
- Born: 1934 Carev Dvor, Resen (Kingdom of Yugoslavia) Yugoslavia (present-day North Macedonia)
- Died: 2013 Skopje; Macedonia (present-day North Macedonia)
- Buried: Monastery in Deljadrovci, Skopje, North Macedonia
- Denomination: Eastern Orthodoxy
- Residence: Skopje
- Occupation: Metropolitan of MPC-OA

The Macedonian Cross.

Kiril (birth name Nikola Popovski, Macedonian Cyrillic: Никола Поповски), was Metropolitan bishop of the no longer existing Diocese of Polog and Kumanovo of Macedonian Orthodox Church – Ohrid Archbishopric.

== Education ==
Kiril completed primary education in his native village and Theological Seminary in Prizren, in present Kosovo. In 1965 he enrolled in the Moscow Spiritual Academy, but after two years of study he came back to Macedonia and completed his studies at the Theological faculty "St. Clement of Ohrid" in Skopje.

== See also ==
- Diocese of Polog and Kumanovo
- Joseph of Kumanovo and Osogovo
- Diocese of Kumanovo and Osogovo
- List of Metropolitans of Diocese of Kumanovo and Osogovo
- Macedonian Orthodox Church – Ohrid Archbishopric
- Kumanovo

Eastern Orthodox Church titles
New title	Metropolitan of Polog and Kumanovo; 1971–2013	Succeeded by Joseph as Metropolitan of Kumanovo and Osogovo; Joseph as Metropolitan of Tetovo and Gostivar
