= EUROFIMA =

European supranational organisation for railways

EUROFIMA; (European Company for the Financing of Railroad Rolling Stock)
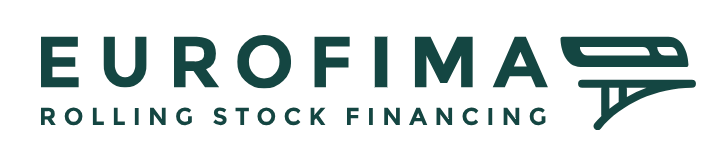

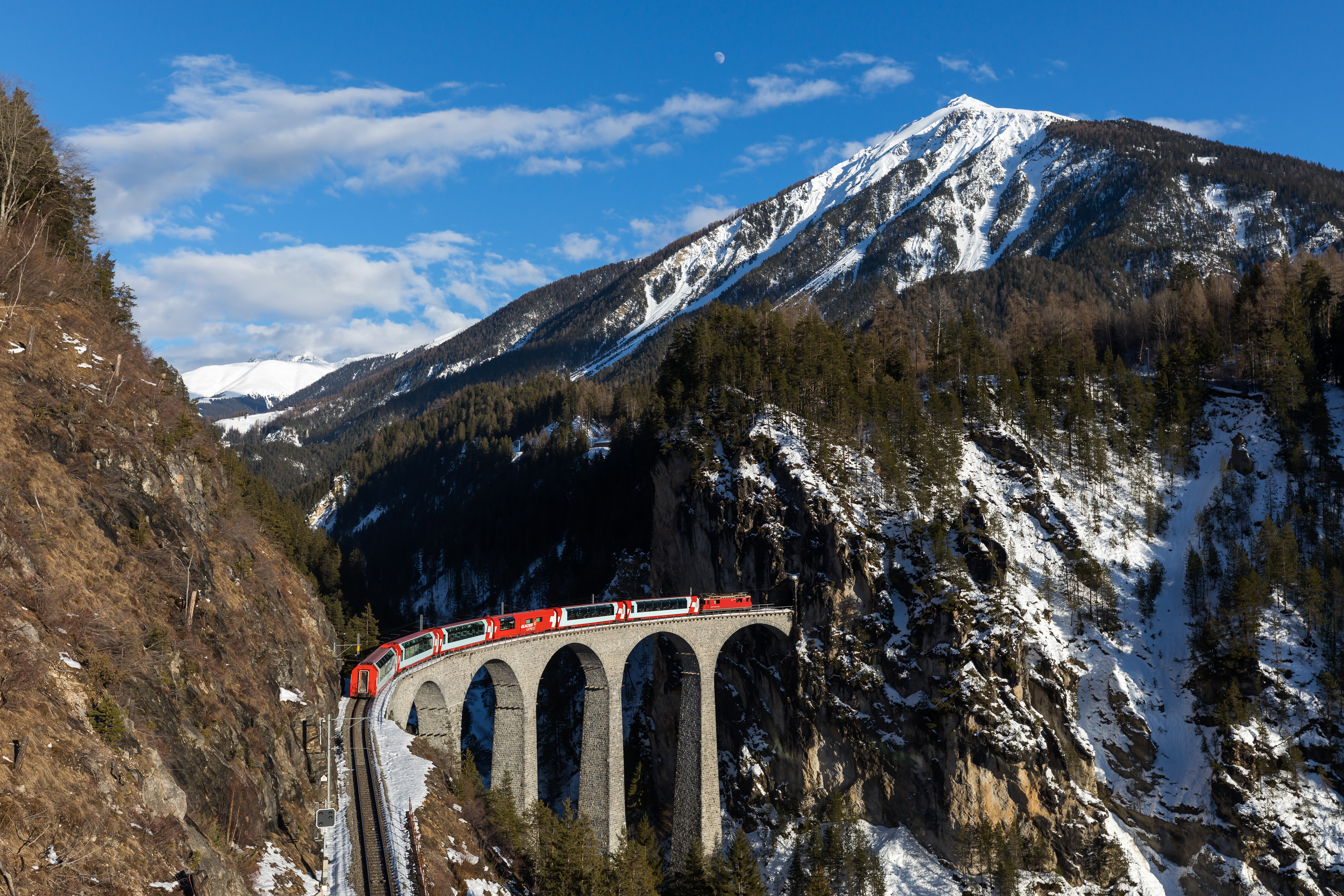
- Company type: International financial institution
- Founded: 1956; 70 years ago
- Headquarters: Basel, Switzerland
- Area served: Europe
- Key people: Christoph Pasternak (CEO); Haldun Kuru (CFO); Ronald Klein Wassink (Chairman)
- Owners: 26 European railway companies
- Number of employees: 28 (2023)
- Capital ratio: 41.3%
- Rating: S&P Global Ratings: AA (stable); Moody’s: Aa2 (stable); Fitch: AA (stable)
- Website: www.eurofima.org

EUROFIMA (European Company for the Financing of Railroad Rolling Stock), is a supranational organization based in Basel, Switzerland. Established in 1956, it operates with a non-profit maximizing mission to support the development of public service passenger rail transportation in its Contracting States. The organization assists railways and public transport authorities (PTA) in financing the renewal and modernization of railway equipment used for Public Service Obligation (PSO) contracts.

Despite its name, the non-profit has no affiliation to the European Union, unlike peer entities such as the European Investment Bank.

Through a membership model, EUROFIMA finances railway equipment through borrowings. The level of support is dependent on the equity provided by the shareholders.

== History ==
=== Foundation ===
EUROFIMA was established on November 20, 1956, by an international treaty between sovereign States (“Contracting States”). Initially founded for a period of 50 years.

In 1984 its mandate was extended until 2056 following a decision by the General Assembly to add another 50 years to the term.

=== Impact of market liberalization 2012-2018 ===
As a result of the 2012-2016 liberalization of European rail markets under successive legislative packages, the European rail market structure changed. This change gave rise to more complex operating and contracting models, with subnational entities emerging as major rolling stock owners in countries such as the United Kingdom, Germany, and France.

In 2018, EUROFIMA's statutes were amended to clarify conditions for public transport authorities and private transport operators to become shareholders or access loans. These changes allow local or regional government guarantees in lieu of state guarantees.

=== Projects 2020-present ===
Publication	Country	Project
2020-07-07	Spain	EUR 303 million financed. EUROFIMA has entered into two financing agreements with Spanish operator Renfe Operadora, providing loans of EUR 200 million (maturing in 2034) and EUR 103 million (maturing in 2030). These funds will be used to modernize Spain's regional rail fleet, including financing Civia EMUs for the Madrid and Barcelona commuter rail networks.
2020-11-26	Sweden	Swedbank invests SEK 500 million as an anchor investor in EUROFIMA's inaugural green bond in Sweden to modernize Europe's railways. The bond totals SEK 1.5 billion and matures over an 8-year period.
2021-07-23	Croatia	EUROFIMA helped finance 12 out of 33 new trains for Croatia's HŽ Putnički Prijevoz, with a total project cost of HRK 1.3 billion (€173 million). The trains, produced by Končar – Electric Vehicles, aim to improve commuter and regional rail services in Croatia.
2024-01-08	Austria	EUR 15 million financed to facilitate the delivery of Faccns four-axle hoppers for ÖBB.
2024-05-31	Belgium	EUR 60.9 million provided for the refinancing of 30 SNCB M6 double-deck coaches originally financed in 2007-2008.
2024-06-13	Croatia	EUR 31 million financed to HŽ Putnički Prijevoz for 7 diesel multiple units. The Croatian government originally gave preliminary consent to the state-owned railway company to borrow 24 million; 10m to finance renovation of locomotives and trains, 14m for the repair of facilities for rolling stock maintenance.

== Shareholders ==
EUROFIMA’s shareholders include railway operators and infrastructure managers from its Contracting States or the states themselves. The current shareholders comprise 26 organizations from 25 European countries.

The following table provides a breakdown of shareholders and their respective contributions to the registered share capital.

Breakdown of EUROFIMA’s shareholders
Shareholder	Contracting State	% of share capital
DB Deutsche Bahn AG	Germany	22.60%
SNCF	France	22.60%
FS Ferrovie dello Stato Italiane S.p.A.	Italy	13.50%
SNCB	Belgium	9.80%
NS Nederlandse Spoorwegen	Netherlands	5.80%
RENFE Operadora	Spain	5.22%
SBB CFF FFS Swiss Federal Railways	Switzerland	5.00%
CFL Luxembourg National Railways	Luxembourg	2.00%
CP Comboios de Portugal, E.P.E. P	Portugal	2.00%
ÖBB Holding AG	Austria	2.00%
OSE CroatiHellenic Railways	(Greece) Grece	2.00%
SJ Näringsdepartementet, Sweden	Sweden	2.00%
ŽS Akcionarsko društvo Železnice Srbije	Serbia	1.08%
ČD České dráhy, a.s.	Czech Republic	1.00%
HŽ Putnički prijevoz d.o.o.	Croatia	0.82%
MÁV Hungarian State Railways Ltd.	Hungary	0.70%
ŽFBiH Javno preduzeće Željeznice Federacije Bosne i Hercegovine d.o.o.	Bosnia and Herzegovina	0.51%
ŽSSK Železničná spoločnosť’ Slovensko, a.s.	Slovakia	0.50%
SŽ Slovenske železnice d.o.o.	Slovenia	0.42%
BDŽ Holding Balgarski Darzhavni Zheleznitsi EAD	Bulgaria	0.20%
ŽRSM Javno pretprijatie Makedonski Železnici-Infrastruktura	North Macedonia	0.09%
ŽPCG Željeznički Prevoz Crne Gore AD	Montenegro	0.06%
TCDD Taşımacılık A.Ş.	Turkey	0.04%
MŽ Železnici na Republika Severna Makedonija Transport AD - Skopje	North Macedonia	0.02%
DSB Danish State Railways	Denmark	0.02%
Vy Group	Norway	0.02%

== Ratings ==
=== Credit ratings ===
The credit ratings are:

- S&P Global Ratings (June 2024): AA (stable)
- Moody’s (November 2023): Aa2 (stable)
- Fitch (June 2023): AA (stable)

=== ESG ratings ===
The organizations environmental, social, and governance (ESG) ratings are:

- Sustainalytics (October 2024): 4.6 (negligible risk)
- ISS ESG (November 2022): B− (prime)
