= SNCF Class BB 63400 =

Class of centre cab diesel locomotives

SNCF BB 63400
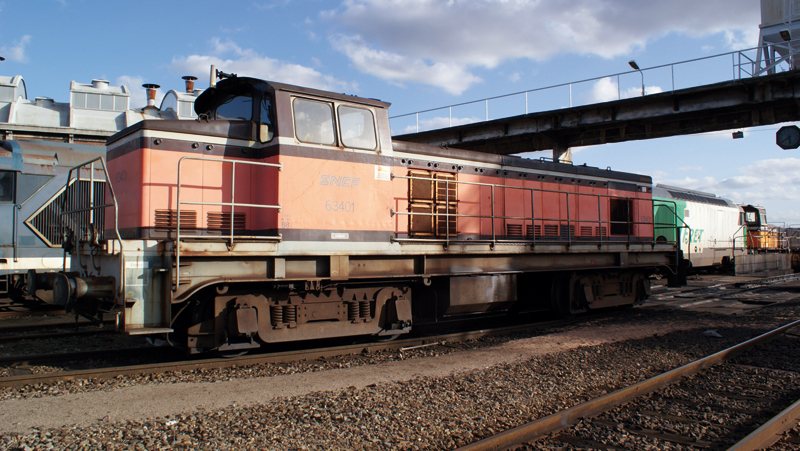
- BB 63401 at Longeau
Type and origin
- Power type: Diesel-electric
- Builder: Brissonneau et Lotz
- Build date: 1959–1960
- Total produced: 23
Specifications
- Configuration
  - UIC: Bo’Bo’
  - Commonwealth: Bo-Bo
- Gauge: 1,435 mm (4 ft 8 1/2 in) standard gauge
- Bogies: 2
- Wheel diameter: 1,050 mm (41 in)
- Length: 14.68 m (48.2 ft)
- Loco weight: 68 t (67 long tons; 75 short tons)
- Fuel type: Diesel
- Prime mover: MGO V12SH
Performance figures
- Maximum speed: 80 km/h (50 mph)
- Power output: 605 kW (811 hp)
- Tractive effort: 167 kN (38,000 lb_{f})
Career
- Operators: SNCF
- Number in class: 23
- Numbers: 63401–63423
- Withdrawn: 2015

The SNCF Class BB 63400 was a class of centre cab diesel locomotives built for SNCF between 1959 and 1960 by Brissonneau et Lotz. The class consisted of 23 locomotives numbered 63401– 63423. Similar to the more powerful Class BB 63500, the construction was financed under the Eurofima arrangements. Initially they were based at Nantes for use as yard pilots. In later years they were transferred elsewhere as electrification took over. The class was withdrawn from service by 2015.

A BB 63400 locomotive, BB 63413 Plathee, was used as a hybrid locomotive testing platform from 2009 to 2011.

== Fleet list ==
Pre 1962 Number	Number	Entered service	Withdrawn	Notes
040 DE 401	BB 63401	11 November 1959	22 December 2011	
040 DE 402	BB 63402	6 November 1959	28 March 2012	Rebuilt as BB 64631
040 DE 403	BB 63403	10 December 1959	10 December 2006	
040 DE 404	BB 63404	12 December 1959	22 February 2011	
040 DE 405	BB 63405	15 December 1959	/	
040 DE 406	BB 63406	5 December 1959	/	
040 DE 407	BB 63407	15 December 1959	16 August 2011	
040 DE 408	BB 63408	10 December 1959	24 September 2011	
040 DE 409	BB 63409	15 December 1959	5 January 2015	
040 DE 410	BB 63410	18 December 1959	28 March 2012	Rebuilt as BB 64620
040 DE 411	BB 63411	28 December 1959	28 February 2012	
040 DE 412	BB 63412	28 December 1959	28 September 2004	
040 DE 413	BB 63413	31 December 1959	15 September 2011	Rebuilt as hybrid demonstrator
040 DE 414	BB 63414	31 December 1959	25 June 2007	
040 DE 415	BB 63415	31 December 1959	25 January 2012	
040 DE 416	BB 63416	11 January 1960	1 December 2011	
040 DE 417	BB 63417	11 January 1960	30 December 2003	
040 DE 418	BB 63418	11 January 1960	15 July 2010	
040 DE 419	BB 63419	11 January 1960	30 December 2003	
040 DE 420	BB 63420	15 January 1960	28 December 2005	
040 DE 421	BB 63421	22 January 1960	31 December 2004	
040 DE 422	BB 63422	23 January 1960	30 December 2003	
040 DE 423	BB 63423	29 January 1960	21 March 2011	
