= BB 63413 Plathee =

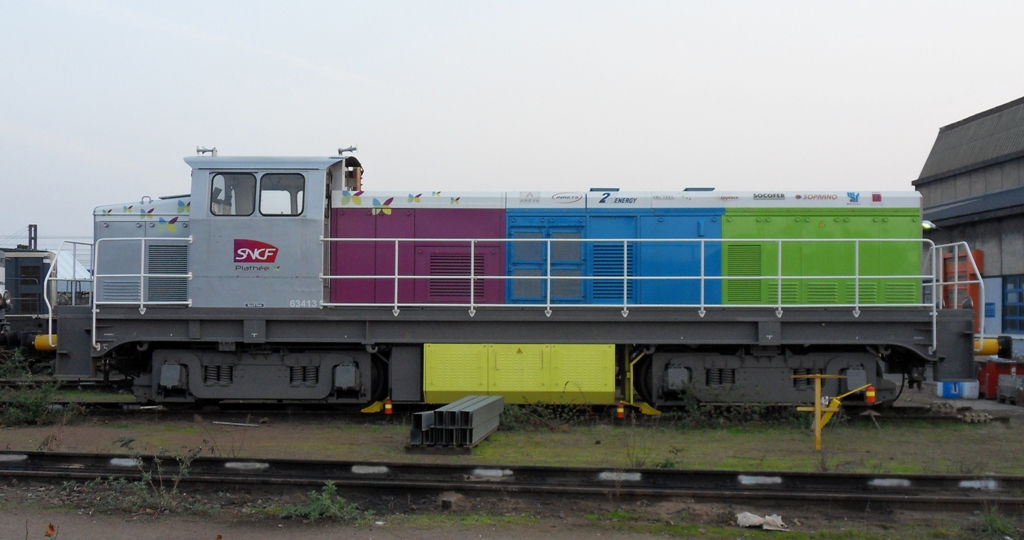
Type and origin
- Power type: Diesel hybrid
Specifications
- Configuration
  - AAR: B-B
- Gauge: 1,435 mm (4 ft 8 1/2 in)
Career
- Operators: SNCF
- Retired: 2011
- Disposition: preserved at Cité du Train

BB 63413 PLATHEE (or Plathée in French) is a hybrid locomotive that was used for testing on the French rail operator SNCF. PLATHEE is an acronym for "Platform for Energy- Efficient and Environmentally Friendly Hybrid Trains".

== Overview ==
BB 63413 is a demonstration platform built from a BB 63400 shunting locomotive and introduced in April 2009. The 63413 is designed to perform two functions common to the 63400 platform: switching (hump yard) service and urban service (operation within 20–40 km of a freight station).

== Prime movers ==
The locomotive uses a downsized diesel engine and a 50 kW HELION fuel cell to provide power. Running tests were done with the fuel cell in September 2009 but it was removed in October 2009 and later running tests were made without it. The project was financed by the French Government through the Environment and Energy Management Agency and several industrial partners.

== Traction motors ==
From the base BB63413 locomotive, only the frame, the bogies and the 4 DC electric motors were retained for the demonstrator model. The maximum speed attained during testing was 79.6 km/h.

== Energy storage ==
The program was to use the Nickel Zinc technology, but due to difficulty in obtaining the necessary batteries, Nickel Cadmium batteries were used instead. The batteries are of 138 Ah, providing 50 kWh of stored energy. There are also 4 ultracapacitor modules, of 25F per module, providing 4 x 3 kWh of stored energy. The locomotive is designed to operate at various operating speeds and can also use biodiesel as a fuel.

== Retirement ==
The Plathee was retired in 2011 at the end of the trials and is now on display at the Cité du Train.
