= Prilep railway station =

Railway station in North Macedonia

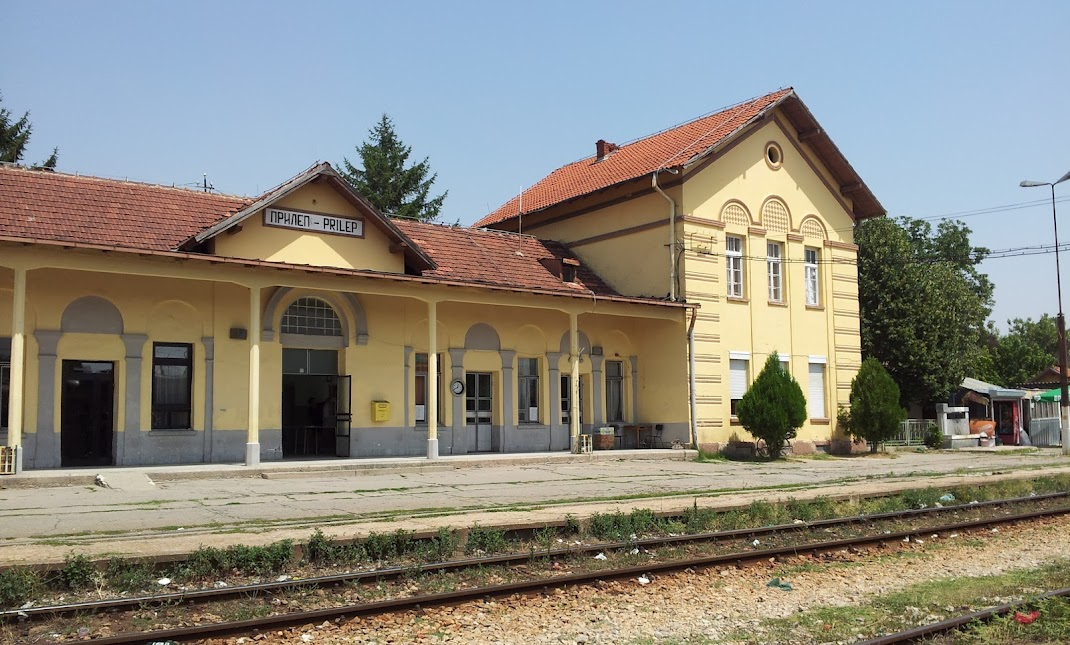
- Prilep railway station, August 2012

General information
- Location: 8GVQ+J6 Prilep, Prilep; North Macedonia
- Coordinates: 41.344223°N 21.537863°E
- Owner: Makedonski Železnici
- Operator: Makedonski Železnici
- Platforms: 2
- Tracks: 3

Construction
- Structure type: at-grade
- Parking: Yes
- Accessible: Yes

History
- Opened: 1891

Services
Preceding station	Hellenic Train	Following station
Makedonski Železnici
Brailovo towards Belgrade	Hellas	Bakarno Gumno towards Thessaloniki
Former service
Makedonski Železnici
Dame Gruev towards Thessaloniki	Thessaloniki–Bitola railway	Kremenica towards Kremenica
Location
- Location within North Macedonia

Prilep railway station (Железничка Станица Прилеп) is the railway station of Prilep in Pelagonia, North Macedonia.

== History ==
The station opened in 1891, in what was then the Ottoman Empire at the completion of the first section of the Société du Chemin de Fer ottoman Salonique-Monastir, a branchline of the Chemins de fer Orientaux from Thessaloniki to Bitola. During this period North Macedonia and the southern Balkans were still under Ottoman rule and Bitola was known as Monastir. Later, the line to Prilep and Veles was built. Bitola was annexed by Serbia on 18 October 1912 during the First Balkan War. On 17 October 1925 The Yugoslavian government purchased the Yugoslav sections of the former Salonica Monastir railway and the railway became part of the Yugoslav Railways, with the remaining section south of Bitola seeded to the Hellenic State Railways. The line to Thessaloniki was closed to traffic in 1984. In 2017 the station was upgraded, the roof was replaced, and new thermal insulation installed, as well as with ramps and a newly refurbished booking hall.

== Services ==
The station is currently located on Branch D section of the Pan-European corridor X.

The station is served by trains to/from Skopje. There are no services to Thessaloniki.

== Future ==
In 2015 plans were announced to reconnected the neglected Macedonian section of the line. By 2019 plans are in place to reconnect the disused sections of the line and recommence through services to Greece. However, no trains are running on the upgraded track.

== Gallery ==
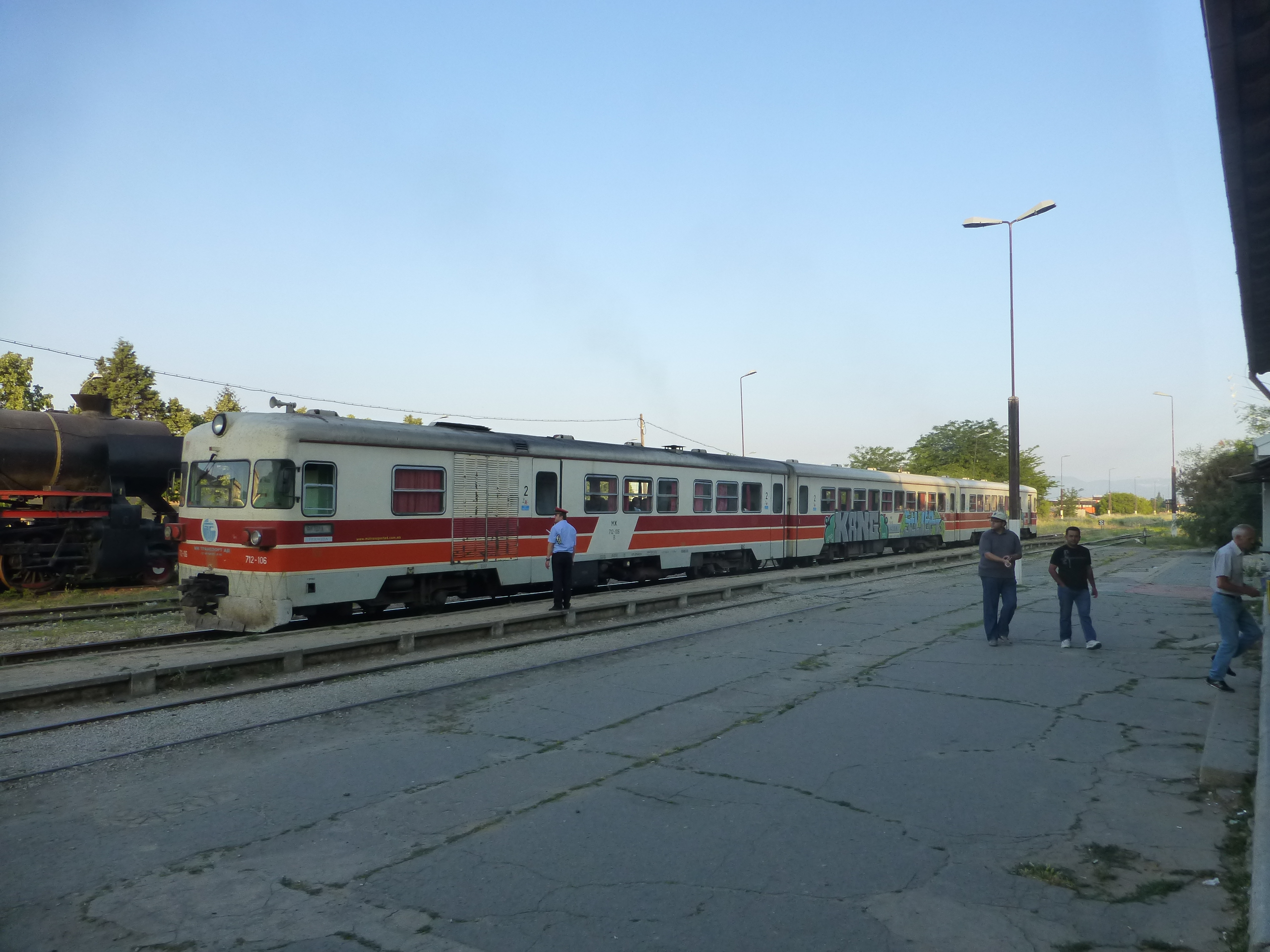
Prilep train station. Passengers are boarding the morning train to Skopje, a historical steam loco parked in sidings.
