= List of metropolitans of the diocese of Kumanovo and Osogovo =

Macedonian cross - one of the symbols of MOC-OA.

This is a list of the metropolitans of the diocese of Kumanovo and Osogovo of the Macedonian Orthodox Church – Ohrid Archbishopric.

== Metropolitans of the former diocese of Polog and Kumanovo ==
Name	Start of reign	End of reign	Birth name	Title
unknown	1958	1967		Metropolitan of Polog and Kumanovo
unknown	1967	1971		Metropolitan of Polog and Kumanovo
Kiril; Кирил	1971	2013	Nikola Popovski	Metropolitan of Polog and Kumanovo

== Metropolitans of the diocese of Kumanovo and Osogovo ==
Name	Start of reign	End of reign	Birth name	Title
Joseph; Јосиф	2013	incumbent		Metropolitan of Kumanovo and Osogovo

== See also ==
- Macedonian Orthodox Church – Ohrid Archbishopric
- Diocese of Kumanovo and Osogovo
