= MŽ series 411 =

MŽ 411
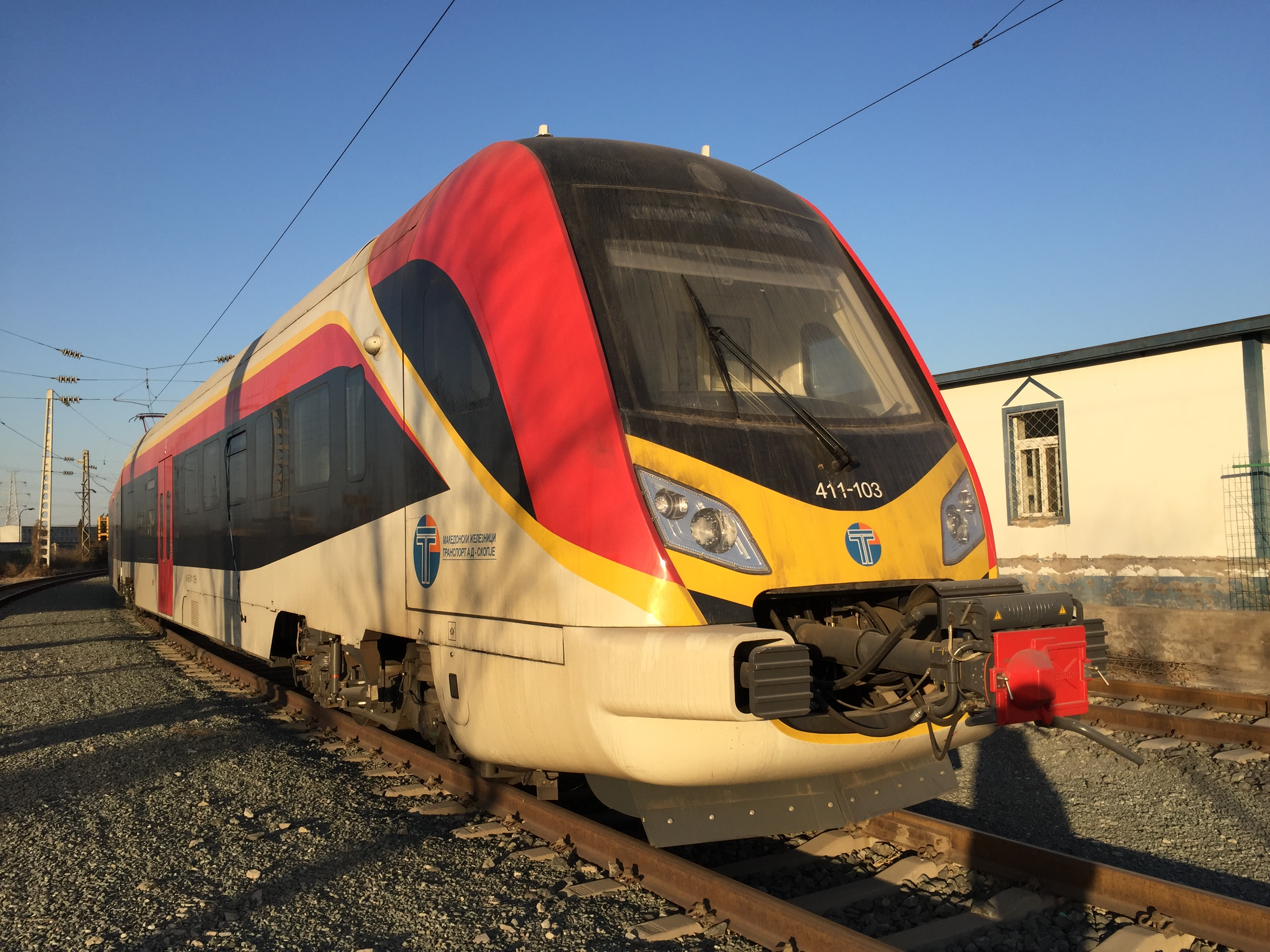
- EMU seen in January 2016
Type and origin
- Power type: Electric
- Builder: CRRC Zhuzhou Locomotive
- Build date: 2015-2016
- Total produced: 2
Specifications
- Gauge: 1,435 mm (4 ft 8 1/2 in) standard gauge
- Electric system/s: 25 kV/50 Hz AC catenary
- Current pickup(s): Pantograph
Performance figures
- Maximum speed: 160 km/h (99 mph)
Career
- Locale: North Macedonia

The MŽ class 411 is an electric multiple unit built for Makedonski Železnici by CRRC Zhuzhou Locomotive.

== History ==
Two three-car Class 411 EMUs have been built by CRRC under a contract signed in June 2014. The railway announced in June 2019 that the units have had electrical problems, which the manufacturer refuses to fix under warranty. There have also been issues with procuring spare parts, as the costs of shipping the items from China exceed the value of the parts themselves

The units were financed in part with a €25 million loan from the European Bank for Reconstruction & Development.

== Technical specifications ==
=== Voltage ===
This train set utilises 25 kV/50 Hz AC.
