= HŽ series 7121 =

Class of Croatian diesel multiple units

HŽ 7121
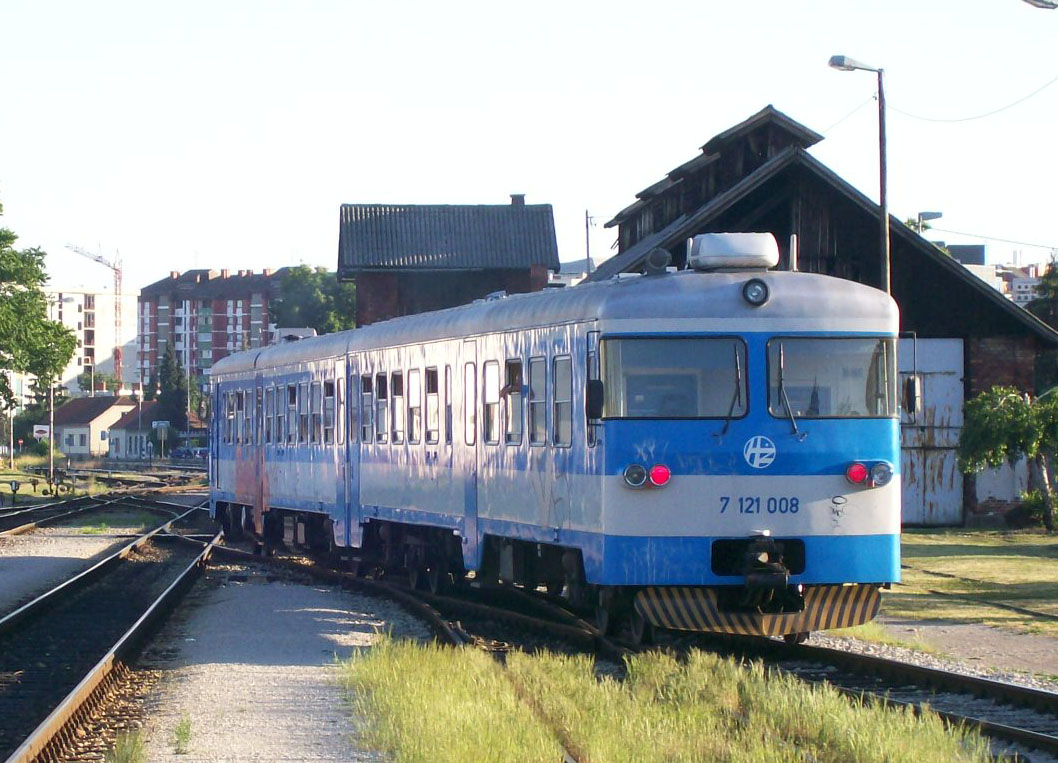
- Diesel-hydraulic motor unit 7121
- Manufacturer: Đuro Đaković
- Constructed: Series 000: 1981–1986
- Number in service: series 000:35,series 100:14(5 modified)
- Formation: 2-car sets Series 000: M+P; Series 100: M+M

Specifications
- Train length: 44.20 m (145 ft 0 in)
- Maximum speed: 120 km/h (75 mph)
- Transmission: Hydraulic
- UIC classification: Series 000: B′B′ + 2′2′ Series 100: 2′B′+B′2′
- Track gauge: 1,435 mm (4 ft 8 1/2 in) standard gauge

HŽ series 7121 (Macosa) is a diesel multiple unit series of the Croatian Railways, consisting of a motor wagon and a trailer. These units are originally built by the factory Đuro Đaković from Slavonski Brod for "ŽTP Zagreb" (a Croatian division of Yugoslav Railways; JŽ) in the period between 1981 and 1986. Under the licence of Macosa, Spain. In 1991, the series became a part of the rolling stock of Croatian Railways (HŽ).

== Exploitation and technical characteristics ==
Diesel multiple unit is particularly suitable for exploitation on railway lines with high passenger frequency, on shorter commuter traffic distances, as well as for greater distances on non-electrified lines. It consists of two motor cars, each being equipped with a driver's cab and the possibility of control depending on the running direction. From one driver's cab it is possible to control three coupled sets of two-part DMU's. A two-part set can carry a total number of 288 passengers, out of which number there are 144 passenger seats. Maximum speed of DMU is 120 km/h. The auto-stop device manufactured by RIZ (Zagreb Radio Industry) has now also been built in. From 1994 onwards, the original JŽ painting scheme of the units began to disappear, as the units started receiving new HŽ exterior colour scheme

== Reconstructions and modifications ==
There are two subseries of these trains - subseries 000 and subseries 100 - subseries 100 were created in 1997 when the modernization of part of the sets by TŽV Gredelj began - the main difference between these subseries is that subseries 000 has both engines located in one trailer, while subseries 100 has one engine in each trailer. Also, the reconstruction during the creation of subseries 100 resulted, among other things, in a complete change of interior (replacement of the seats, wall panels, toilet facilities, etc.), and in partial change of the frontal exterior design, as well as adding the side displays.

In 2010, TŽV Gredelj also began to modernize the sets of the 000 series, which primarily included changing of the interior and only some minor modifications to the exterior, such as adding side and/or front displays. Also, 000 sub-sets that were reconstructed during 2020's also received air-conditioned interiors (passenger compartment) and audio/video passenger information system.

== Gallery ==
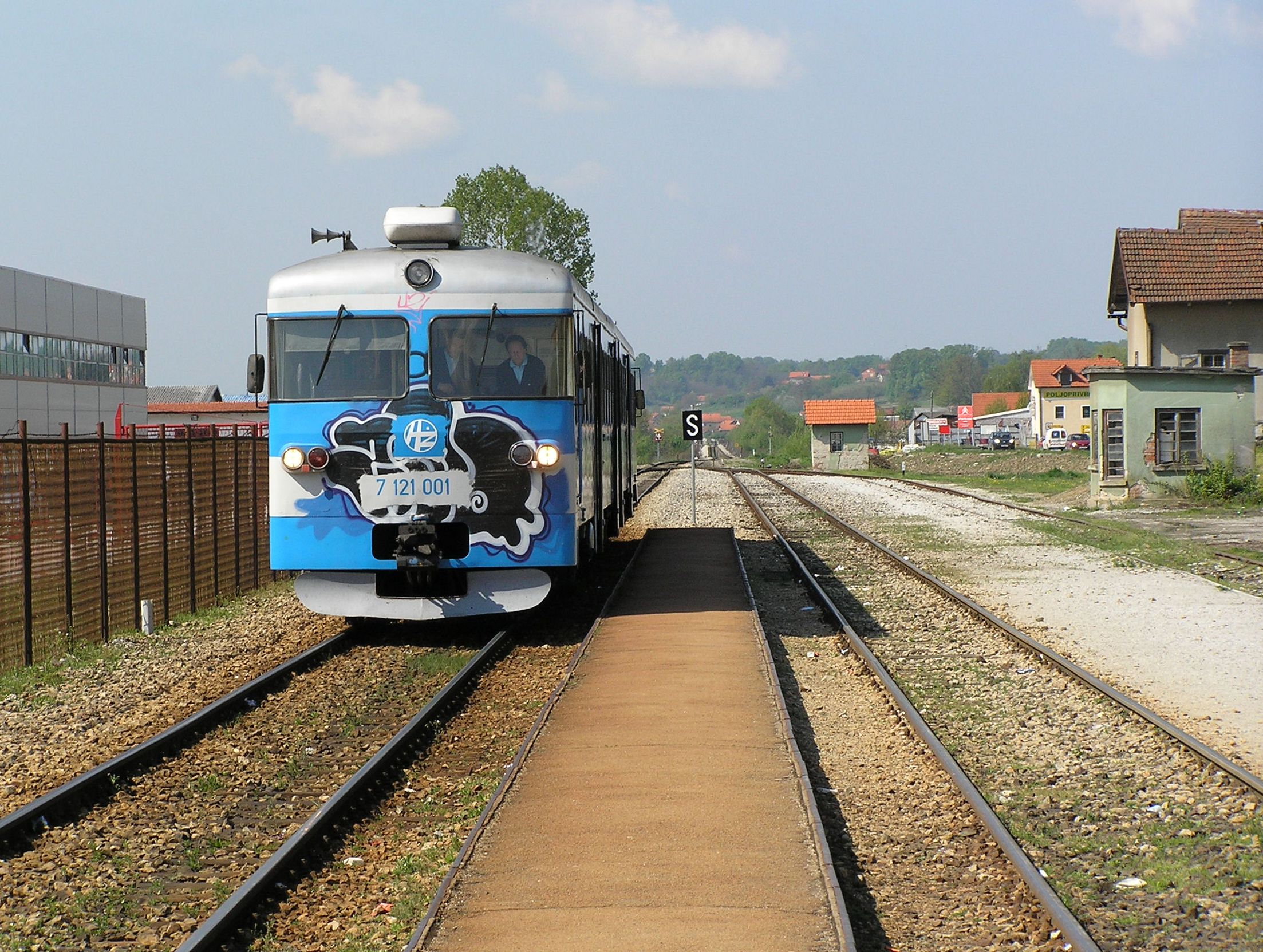
HŽ 7 121-001

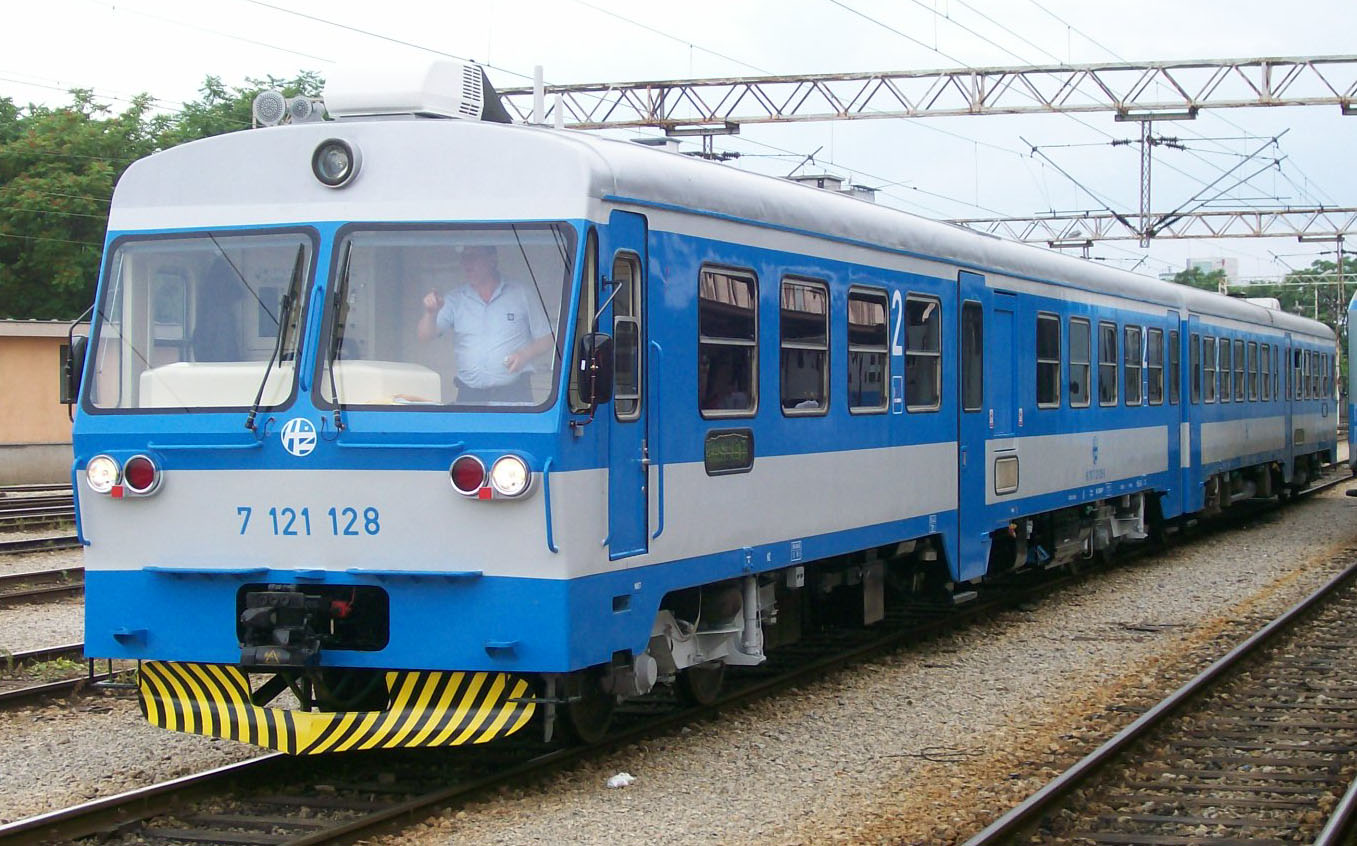
HŽ 7 121-128

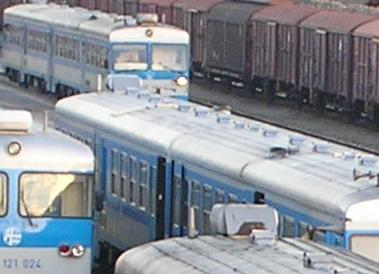
