= Volkovo, Prilep =

Volkovo Волково
- Village
- Location within North Macedonia
- Country: North Macedonia
- Region: Pelagonia
- Municipality: Prilep
- Elevation: 795 m (2,608 ft)

Population (2002)
  - Total: 42
- Time zone: UTC+1 (CET)
- Postal code: 7500
- Area code: +38948

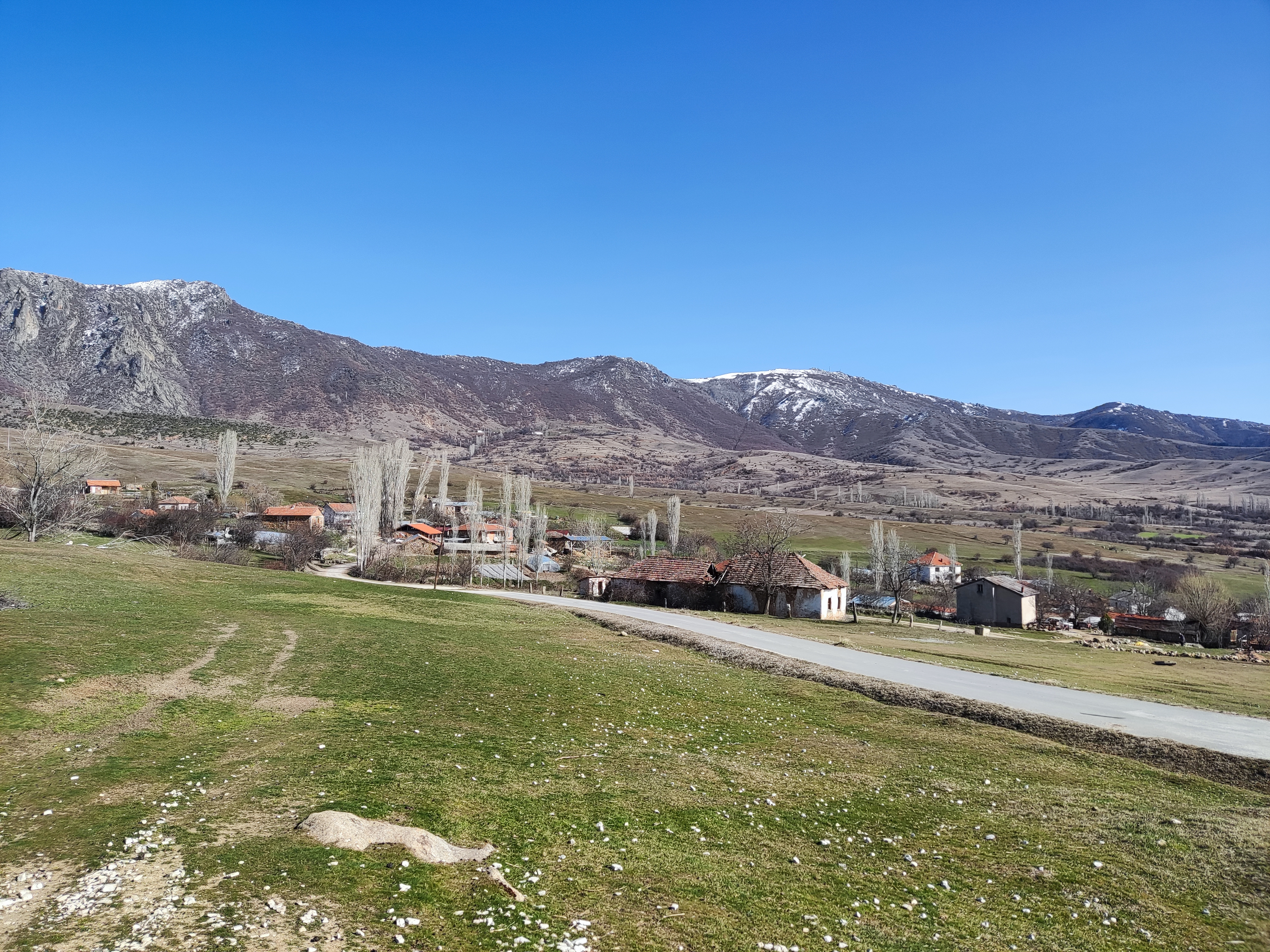
Volk'ovo village, Prilep region

Volkovo is a village in Municipality of Prilep.

== Demographics ==
According to the 2002 census, the village had a total of 42 inhabitants. Ethnic groups in the village include:

- Macedonians 42
