= Kremenica =

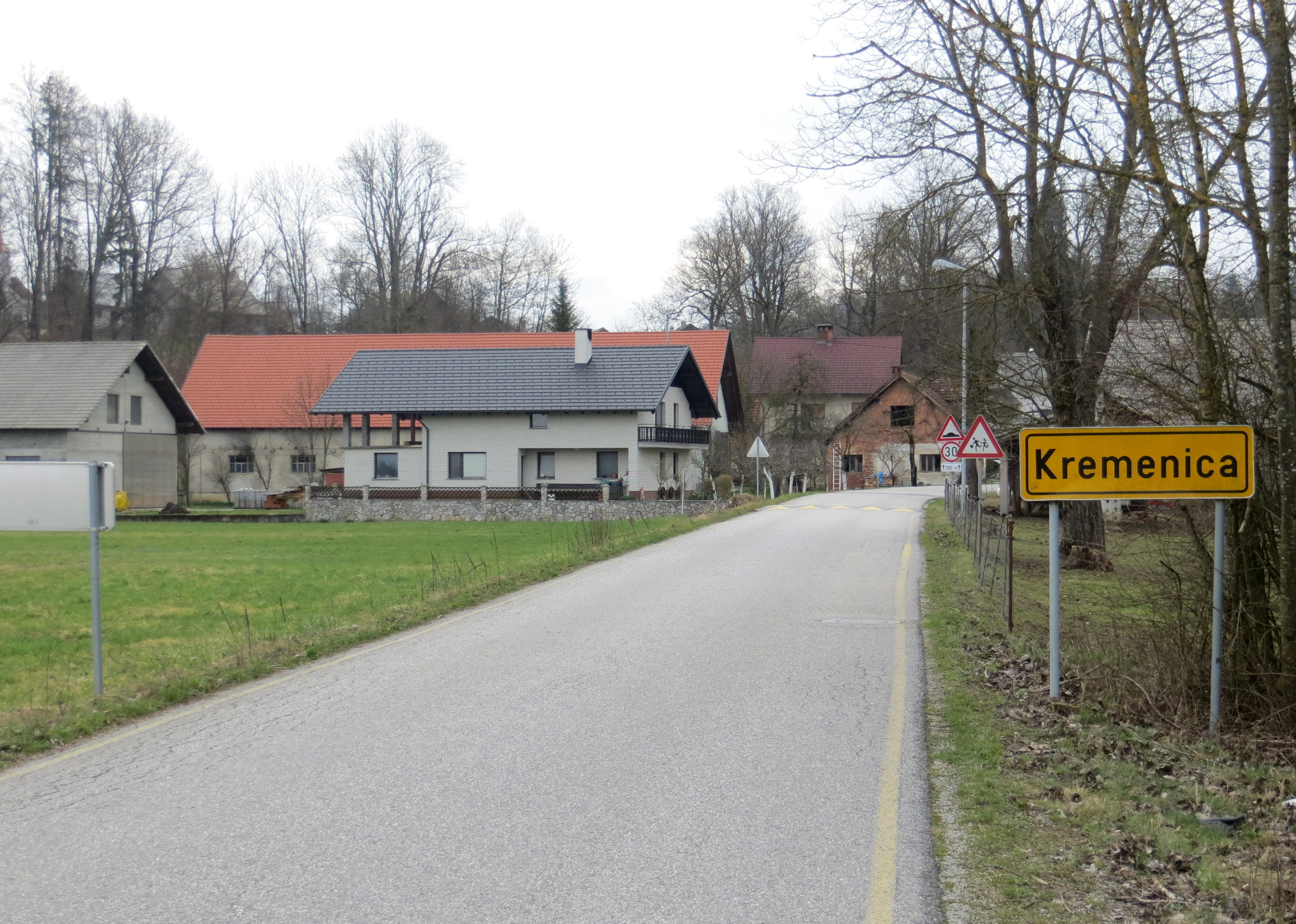

- Location in Slovenia
- Coordinates: 45°57′9.34″N 14°32′55.07″E
- Country: Slovenia
- Traditional region: Inner Carniola
- Statistical region: Central Slovenia
- Municipality: Ig

Area
  - Total: 2 km^{2} (0.77 sq mi)
- Elevation: 317.4 m (1,041 ft)

Population (2002)
  - Total: 60
- Postal code: 1292

Kremenica (pronounced [kɾɛˈmeːnitsa]) is a settlement immediately southeast of Ig in central Slovenia. The entire Municipality of Ig is part of the traditional region of Inner Carniola. It is included in the Central Slovenia Statistical Region.

== Church ==
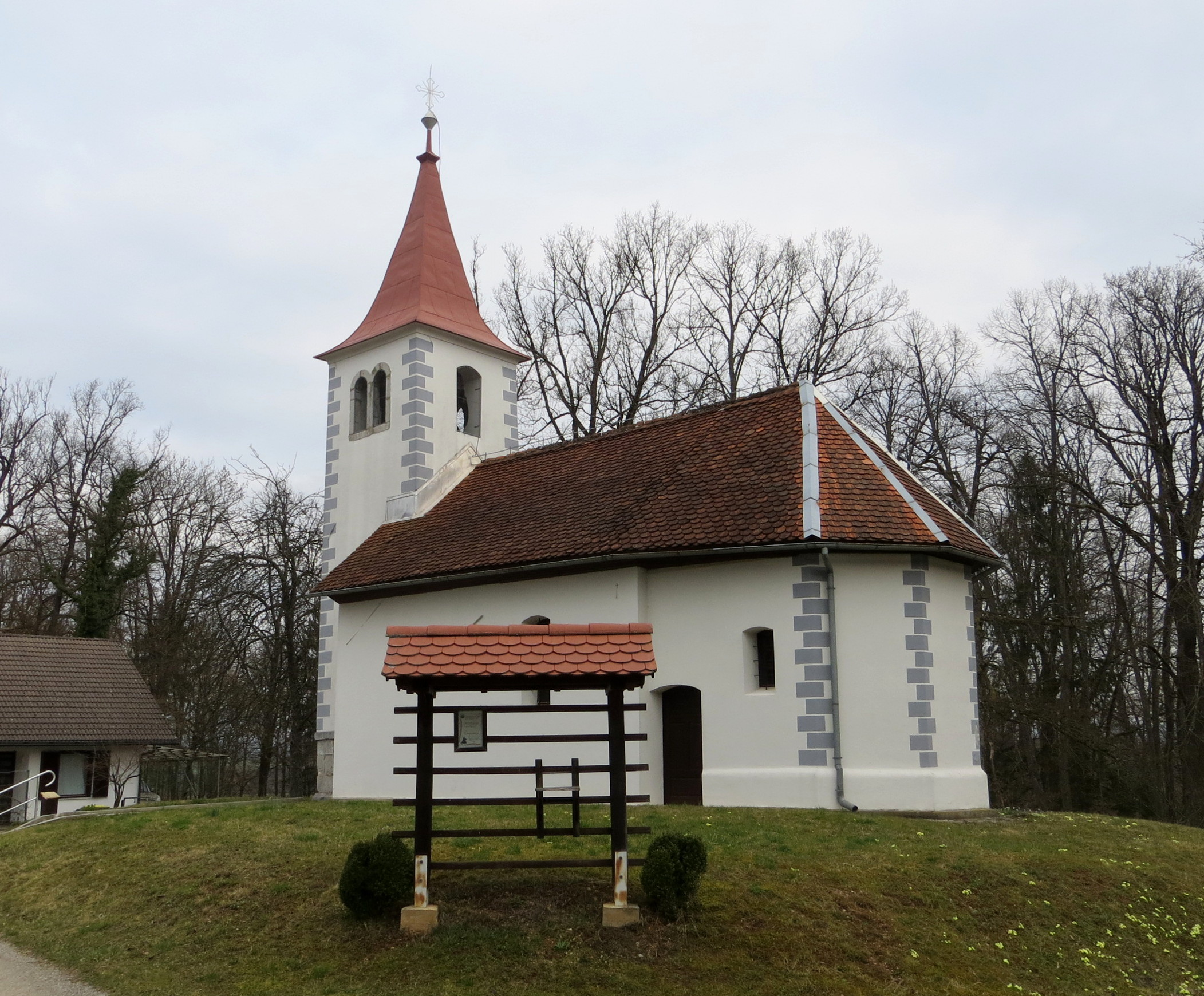
Saint Ulrich's Church

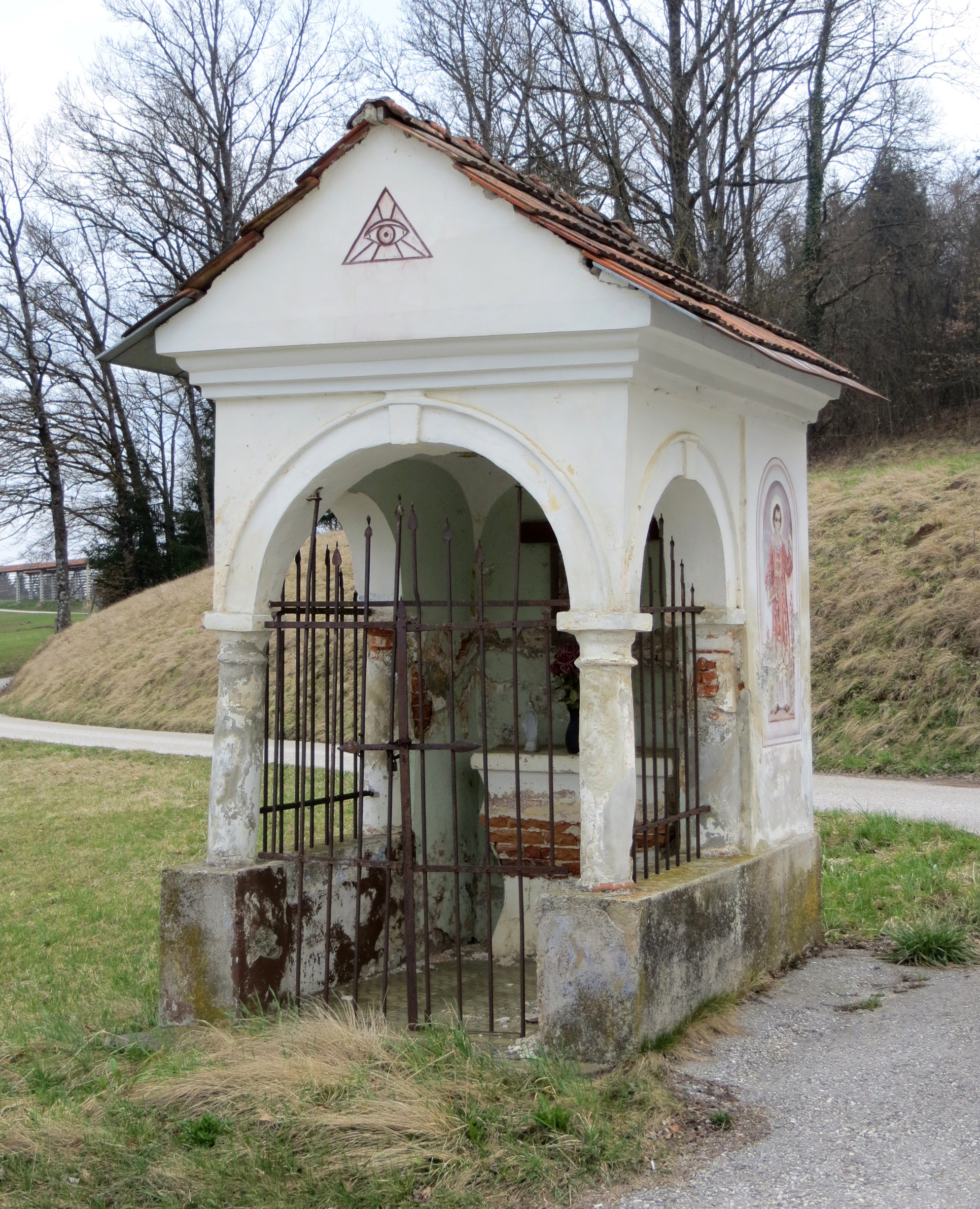
Chapel-shrine

Religious heritage in Kremenica

The local church, built on a small hill in the settlement, is dedicated to Saint Ulrich (Slovene: sveti Urh) and belongs to the Parish of Ig. It was built in the 17th century on the site of an earlier church. Even though the church is dedicated to Saint Ulrich, the villagers venerate Saint Valentine more. In the past, the church's painting of Saint Valentine was temporarily moved from the side altar to the main altar on his feast day, and now it is displayed there permanently. The annual village blessings are also conferred on Saint Valentine's Day.

At the base of the hill below the village, at the intersection with the main road to Ig, is an open chapel-shrine. It dates from the 19th century.
