= CP Class 1200 =

Class 1200
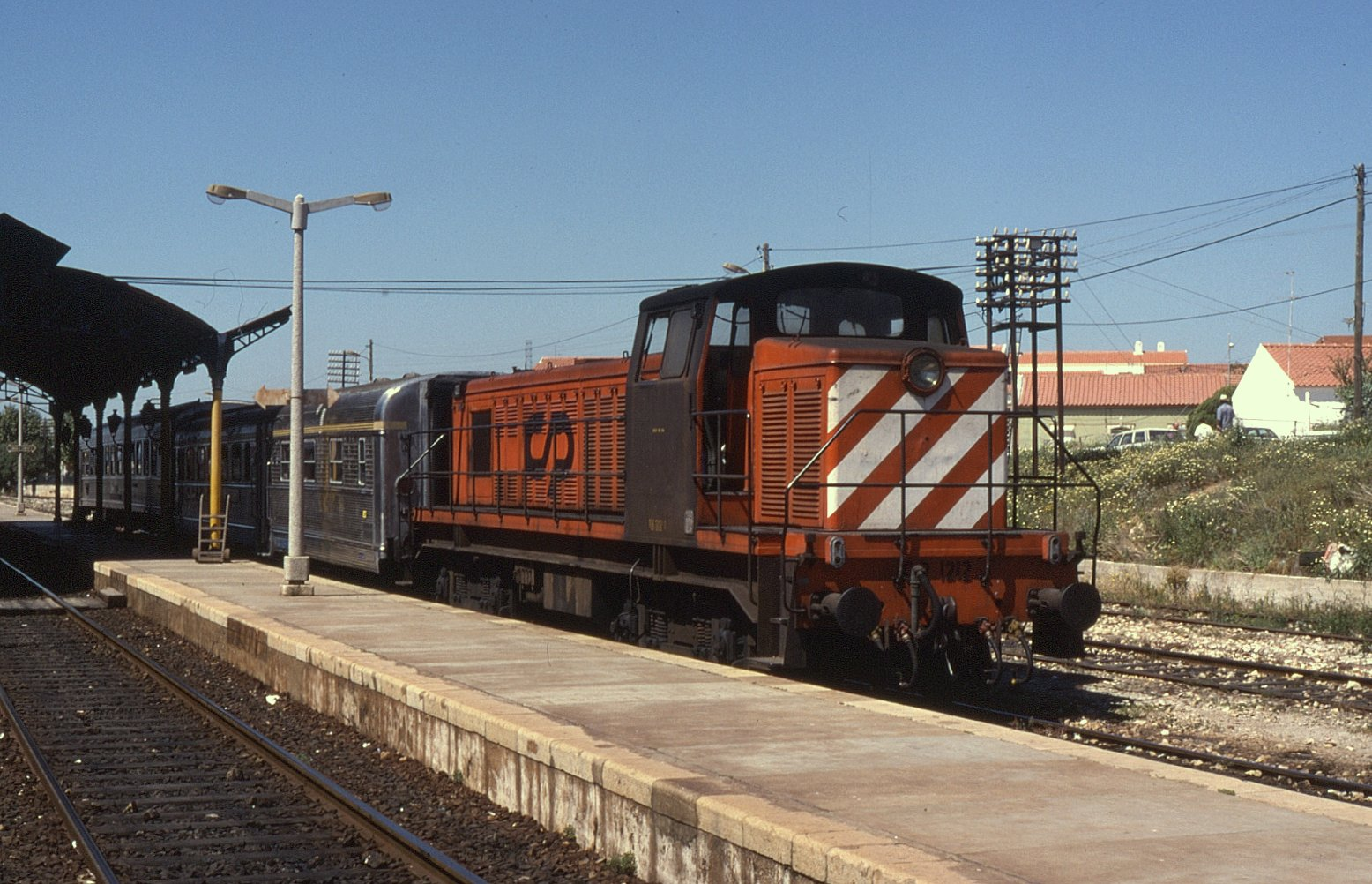
- CP Class 1200 locomotive 1212 at Tunes station in April 1999
Type and origin
- Power type: Diesel-electric
- Builder: Brissonneau & Lotz, Sorefame
- Build date: 1961–1964
- Total produced: 25
Specifications
- Configuration
  - UIC: Bo'Bo'
- Gauge: 1,668 mm (5 ft 5 21/32 in) Iberian gauge
- Length: 14,680 mm (48 ft 2 in)
- Loco weight: 61 t
- Prime mover: MGO-V-12AHSR
- Traction motors: x4
- Cylinders: V12
Performance figures
- Maximum speed: 80 km/h (50 mph)
- Power output: 615 kW (825 hp)
- Tractive effort: 157 kN
Career
- Operators: Comboios de Portugal
- Class: Série 1200

The Série 1200 is a class of diesel-electric multipurpose locomotives used by Portuguese Railways (CP). A total of 25 locomotives were built between 1961 and 1964.

== Technical equipment ==
The locomotives are powered by a MGO-V-12AHSR V12 engine with a power output of 615 kW (825 hp), which powers a direct-current generator providing electricity to the four traction motors. Their maximum speed is 80 km/h (50 mph).

== History ==
A total of 25 locomotives were built by Brissonneau & Lotz and Sorefame based on a standard design previously supplied to French national railway SNCF. Upon delivery, they carried a blue livery, and were later repainted into the standard Portuguese Railways orange livery.

=== Operations ===
The Class 1200 was used on passenger and commuter trains in the Algarve region, around Porto and north of Beja. With the introduction of more powerful diesel locomotives and diesel multiple units, the Class 1200 locomotives were used for shunting duties, as well as freight services.

Withdrawn Class 1200 locomotives were sold to Argentina in 2007 as part of a rolling stock sale worth 27 million euros.

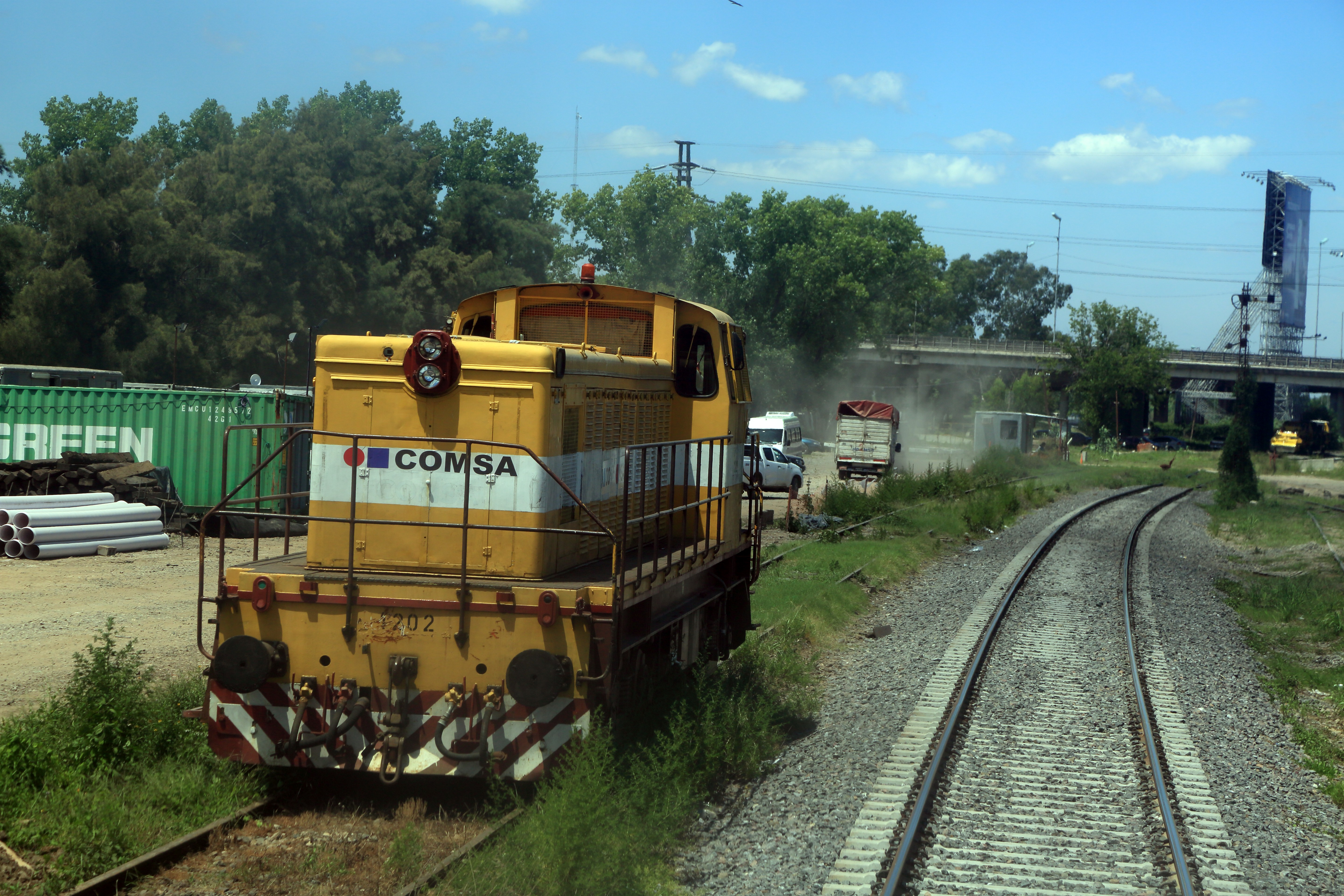
Class 1200 locomotive operated by Comsa in Argentina in February 2019
