= Diocese of Polog and Kumanovo =

Diocese of Polog and Kumanovo Епархија Полошко Кумановска

Location
- Territory: Bogovinje, Brvenica, Gostivar, Jegunovce, Mavrovo and Rostuša, Tearce, Tetovo, Vrapčište, Želino, Kumanovo, Kratovo, Kriva Palanka, Rankovce, Lipkovo, Staro Nagorichane
- Headquarters: Skopje; North Macedonia

Information
- Denomination: Eastern Orthodox
- Established: 1958
- Dissolved: 2013

Leadership
- Bishop: Kiril (1971–2013)

Website
- website

The diocese of Polog and Kumanovo was a diocese of the Macedonian Orthodox Church – Ohrid Archbishopric in North Macedonia. It ceased to exist on 19 June 2013 when it was divided into the diocese of Kumanovo and Osogovo and the Diocese of Tetovo and Gostivar. From 1971 until his death in 2013, the head of Diocese of Polog and Kumanovo was Kiril.

== See also ==
- Kiril of Polog and Kumanovo
- Diocese of Kumanovo and Osogovo
- List of Metropolitans of Diocese of Kumanovo and Osogovo
