= Deljadrovci =

Deljadrovci Дељадровци
- Village
- Location within North Macedonia
- Country: North Macedonia
- Region: Skopje
- Municipality: Ilinden

Population (2021)
  - Total: 535
- Time zone: UTC+1 (CET)
  - Summer (DST): UTC+2 (CEST)
- Car plates: SK
- Website: .

Deljadrovci (Macedonian: Дељадровци) is a village in the Ilinden Municipality of North Macedonia.

== Demographics ==
As of the 2021 census, Deljadrovci had 535 residents with the following ethnic composition:

- Macedonians 499
- Serbs 17
- Persons for whom data are taken from administrative sources 10
- Others 9

According to the 2002 census, the village had a total of 532 inhabitants. Ethnic groups in the village include:

- Macedonians 517
- Serbs 12
- Others 3
