= HŽ series 2042 =

Series 2042
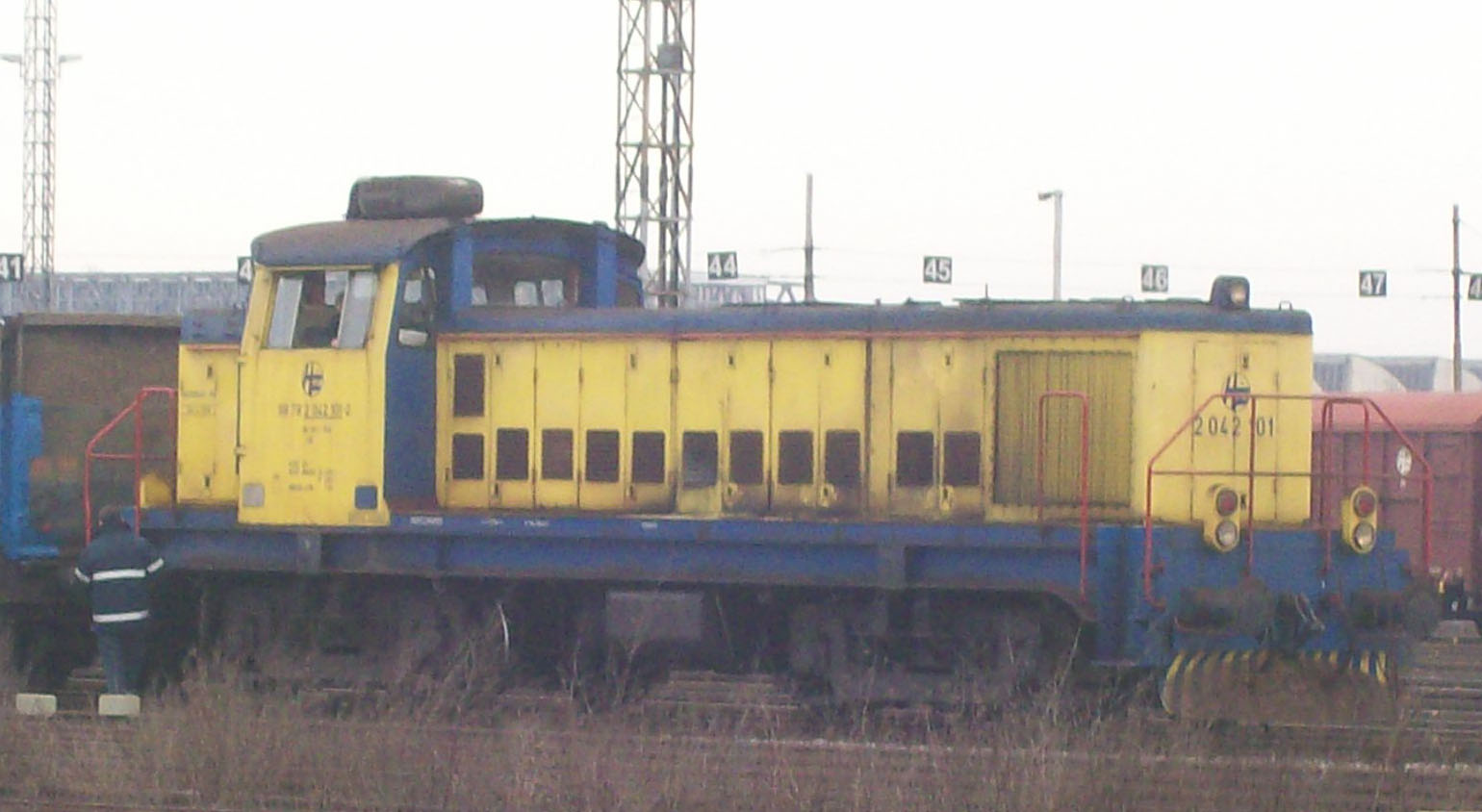
- Series 2042
Type and origin
- Power type: Diesel-electric
- Builder: Đuro Đaković, Brissonneau et Lotz
- Build date: 1962–1967
Specifications
- Configuration
  - UIC: Bo′Bo′
- Gauge: 1,435 mm (4 ft 8 1/2 in) standard gauge
- Length: 14.740 m (48 ft 4 3/8 in)
- Loco weight: 67.2 t (66.1 long tons; 74.1 short tons) / 74 t (73 long tons; 82 short tons)
- Engine type: V12
- Cylinders: 12
Performance figures
- Maximum speed: 80 km/h (50 mph)
- Power output: Series 000: 680 kW (910 hp), Series 100: 750 kW (1,010 hp)
Career
- Class: HŽ 2042
- Nicknames: Đuran
- Locale: Croatia

Series 2042 is a diesel locomotive series on Croatian Railways (Croatian: hrvatske željeznice, HŽ).

This series is not substantively different from the series 2041, except that they have a stronger engine. With the upgrade in motor, this locomotives changed the traction behavior. These are four-axle locomotives with every axle separately powered. This series is built for hauling of lighter freight trains and for heavy maneuvering.
