= HŽ series 2041 =

Locomotive class

HŽ Series 2041
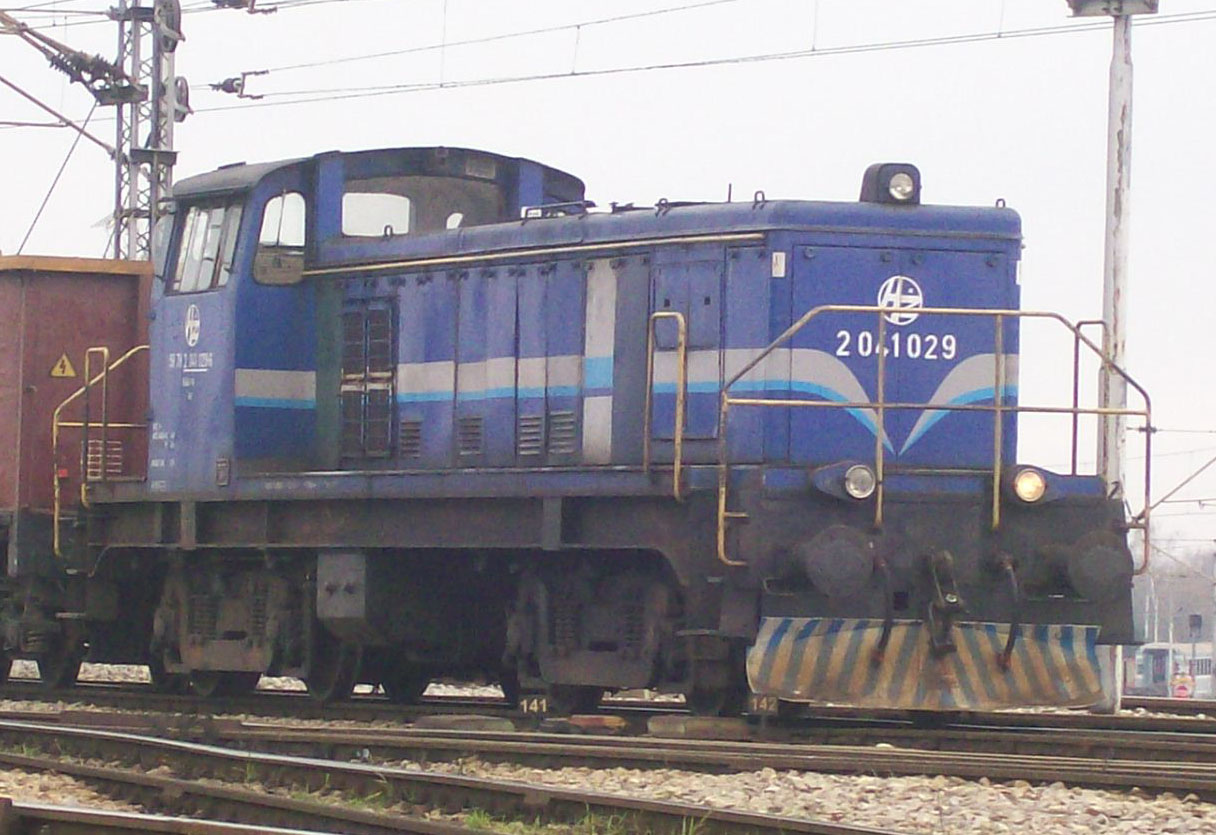
- Series 2041
Type and origin
- Power type: Diesel-electric
- Builder: Đuro Đaković, Brissonneau et Lotz
- Total produced: 33 for HŽ,3x2041.0,10x2041.1,total 13 active(20 withdrawn)
Specifications
- Configuration
  - UIC: Bo′Bo′
- Gauge: 1,435 mm (4 ft 8 1/2 in) standard gauge
- Length: 14.740 m (48 ft 4 in)
- Loco weight: 67 tonnes (66 long tons; 74 short tons)
- Engine type: V12
- Cylinders: 12
Performance figures
- Maximum speed: 80 km/h (50 mph)
- Power output: 578 hp (431 kW)
Career
- Operators: HŽ
- Numbers: HŽ-2041
- Nicknames: "Đuran"
- Locale: Croatia

Series 2041 is a diesel-electric locomotive class on Croatian Railways (Croatian: hrvatske željeznice, HŽ).

These locomotives are built for hauling lighter freight trains, lighter passenger trains and also for heavy shunting.

== Design ==
The locomotives of the series have four axles, an individual axle drive and a Bo'Bo' axle layout. The 2041 series locomotive is equipped with a four-stroke diesel engine with twelve cylinders of the V-type MGO-V12 ASHR with a turbocharger, which is capable of reaching a maximum power output of 607 kW. The modernized 2041.1 series locomotives are fitted with an eight-cylinder, V-type Caterpillar 3508 B diesel engine, with a power output capable of reaching 745 kW. The locomotive has an electric transmission and a direct current main generator with a power of 494 kW, it has an auxiliary generator and four DC electric traction motors with a power of 123.5 kW. In the case of the 2041.1 series locomotive, the auxiliary generator was removed and replaced with an alternating current adapter and an auxiliary alternator.

The HŽ 2041 series locomotives maximum speed is set to 80 km/h. The locomotives are equipped with air brakes. The modernized 2041.1 series locomotives are additionally equipped with an automatic anti-slip protection, overvoltage protection in the towing circuit and speed overlay protection. In July 2017, all the locomotives of the series were equipped with an autostop device, in order to meet the requirements for open-line traffic in accordance with the law on the safety and interoperability of the railway system.
