= Brissonneau and Lotz =

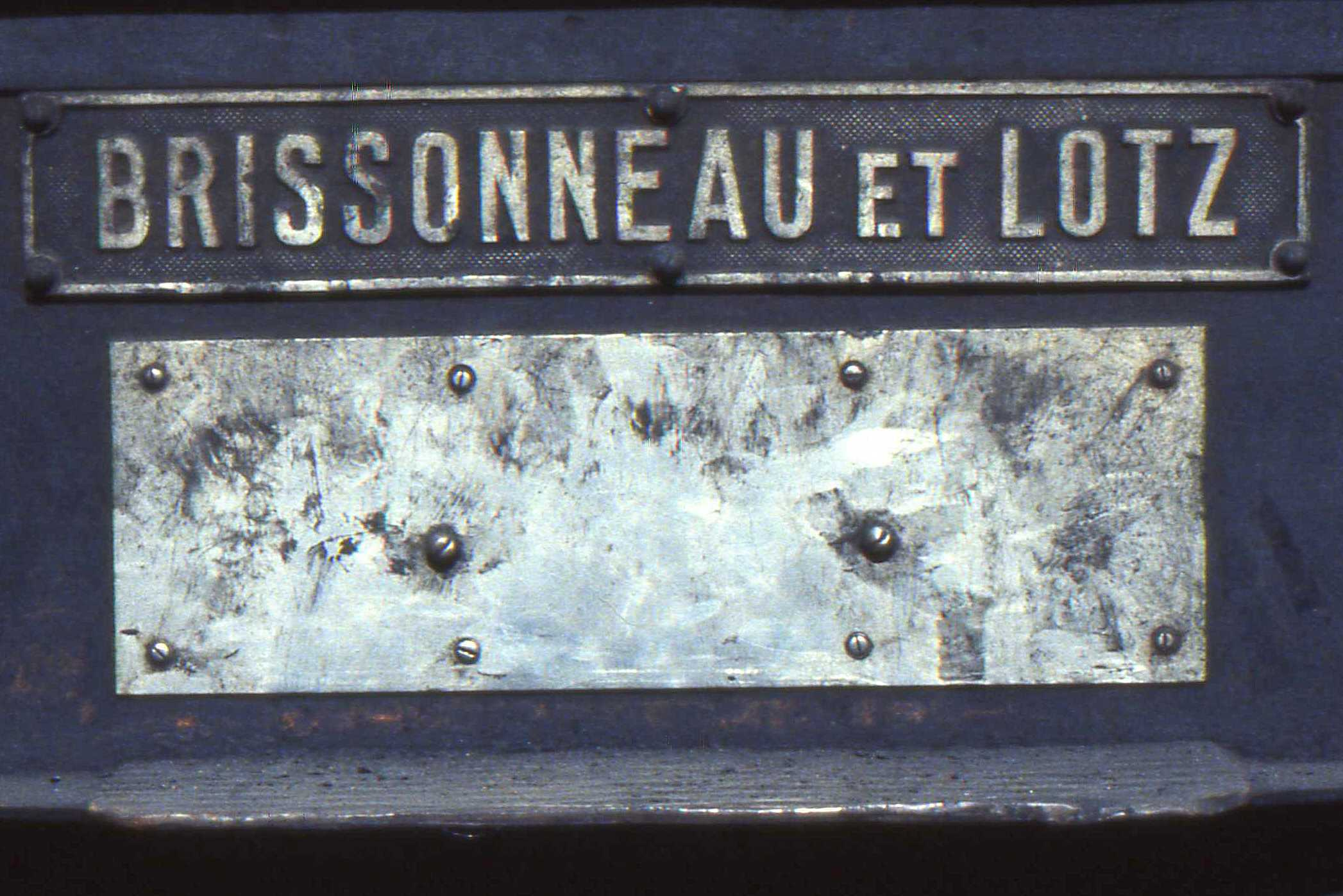
- Company type: Subsidiary
- Industry: Rail transport
- Founded: 1876; 150 years ago
- Defunct: 1996
- Successor: Opel
- Headquarters: Nantes, France
- Area served: Worldwide
- Products: Locomotives; High-speed trains Intercity and commuter trains Trams; People movers Signalling systems
- Owner: Renault

Brissonneau et Lotz was a French locomotive engineering company that specialized in the production of railway locomotives and wagons. The company was also a supplier of rolling stock to the Paris Metro, constructing in 1951 the first metro trains in the world to be equipped with rubber tyres.

In 1972 it was absorbed into Alstom, becoming Alsthom Groupe Brissonneau. The company was founded in Nantes where it had many of its principal facilities, but by the time it lost its independence it had acquired or established factories and workshops in many parts of France.

== Automobile production ==
In the 1950s Brissonneau and Lotz branched out into automobile production, building a small low volume cabriolet sports car based on the Renault 4CV, which was launched during the summer of 1956. A couple of years later, during 1958 and 1959 the small automobile factory was transformed into a substantial production facility when the company received a contract from Renault to assemble the manufacturer's stylish new Floride model. The Floride, later rebadged as the Renault Caravelle, would continue to be produced at the factory until 1968.

The company was also a contractor for Opel, making the body for the Opel GT sports car. Lower volume production of other car bodies continued until the factory closed in 1996 following an industrial dispute.
