= TCDD E 52500 =

TCDD E52500
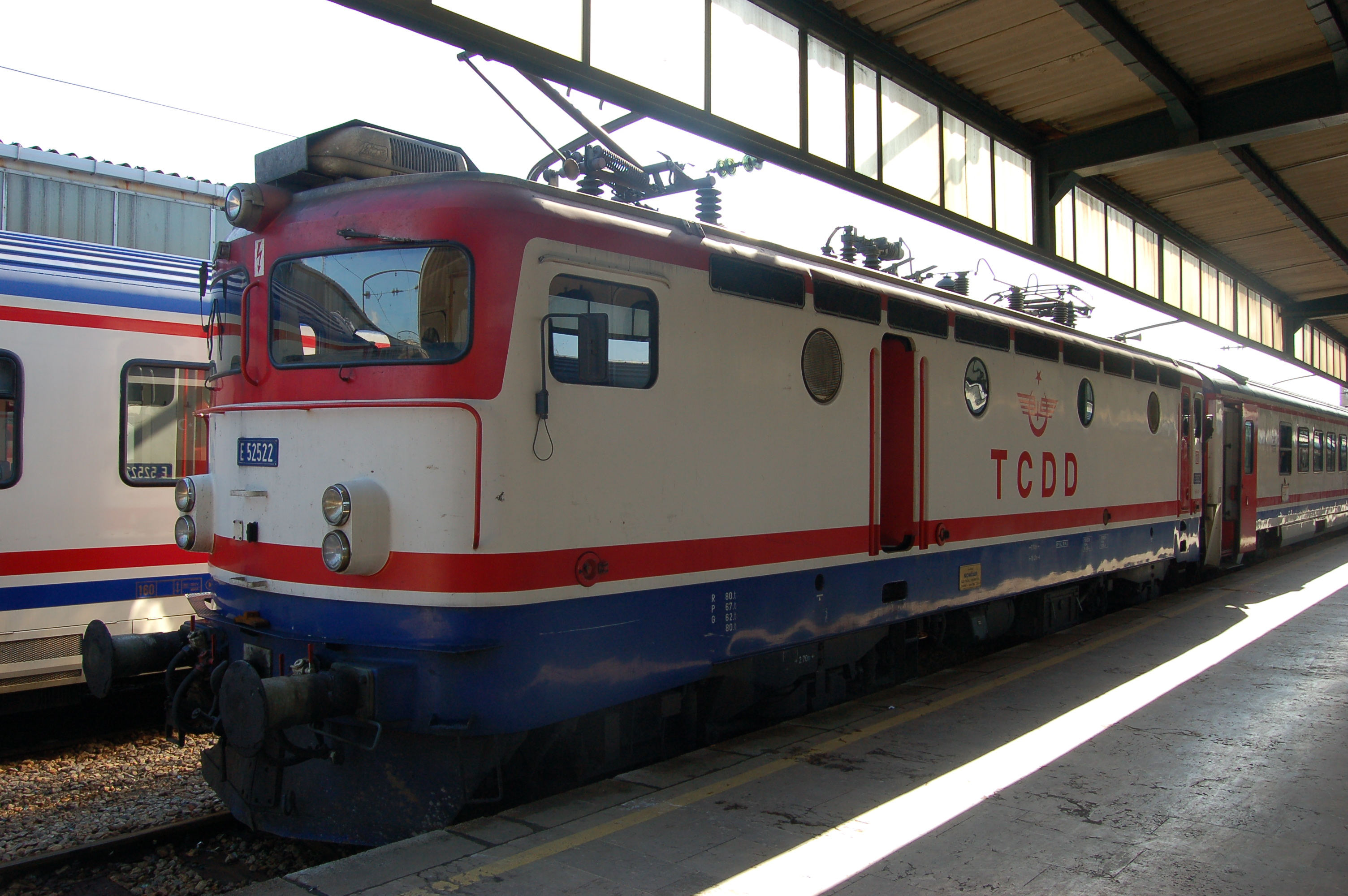
- TCDD E52522 at Haydarpaşa
Type and origin
- Power type: Electric
- Designer: ASEA
- Builder: Končar
- Build date: 1967 (used by TCDD since 1998)
- Total produced: 22 (rented by TCDD)
Specifications
- Configuration
  - AAR: B-B
  - UIC: Bo'Bo'
- Gauge: 1,435 mm (4 ft 8 1/2 in)
- Length: 15.47 m (50 ft 9 in)
- Loco weight: 82 tonnes (81 long tons; 90 short tons)
- Electric system/s: 25 kV 50 Hz AC Catenary
- Current pickup: Pantograph
Performance figures
- Maximum speed: 120–160 km/h (70–100 mph)
- Power output: 3,860 kW (5,180 hp)
- Tractive effort: 275 kN (62,000 lbf)
Career
- Operators: Turkish State Railways
- Numbers: E52501 – E52522

TCDD E52500 is a series of electric locomotives used by the Turkish State Railways, comprising 22 HŽ series 1141 locomotives leased from Željeznice Federacije Bosne i Hercegovine in Bosnia-Herzegovina. They are used throughout the electrified parts of the Turkish rail network. The locomotives have a power output of 3,860 kW and are capable of 120, 140 or 160 km/h speed depending on the version. Not all of them came from ŽFBH, or at the same time.

== History ==
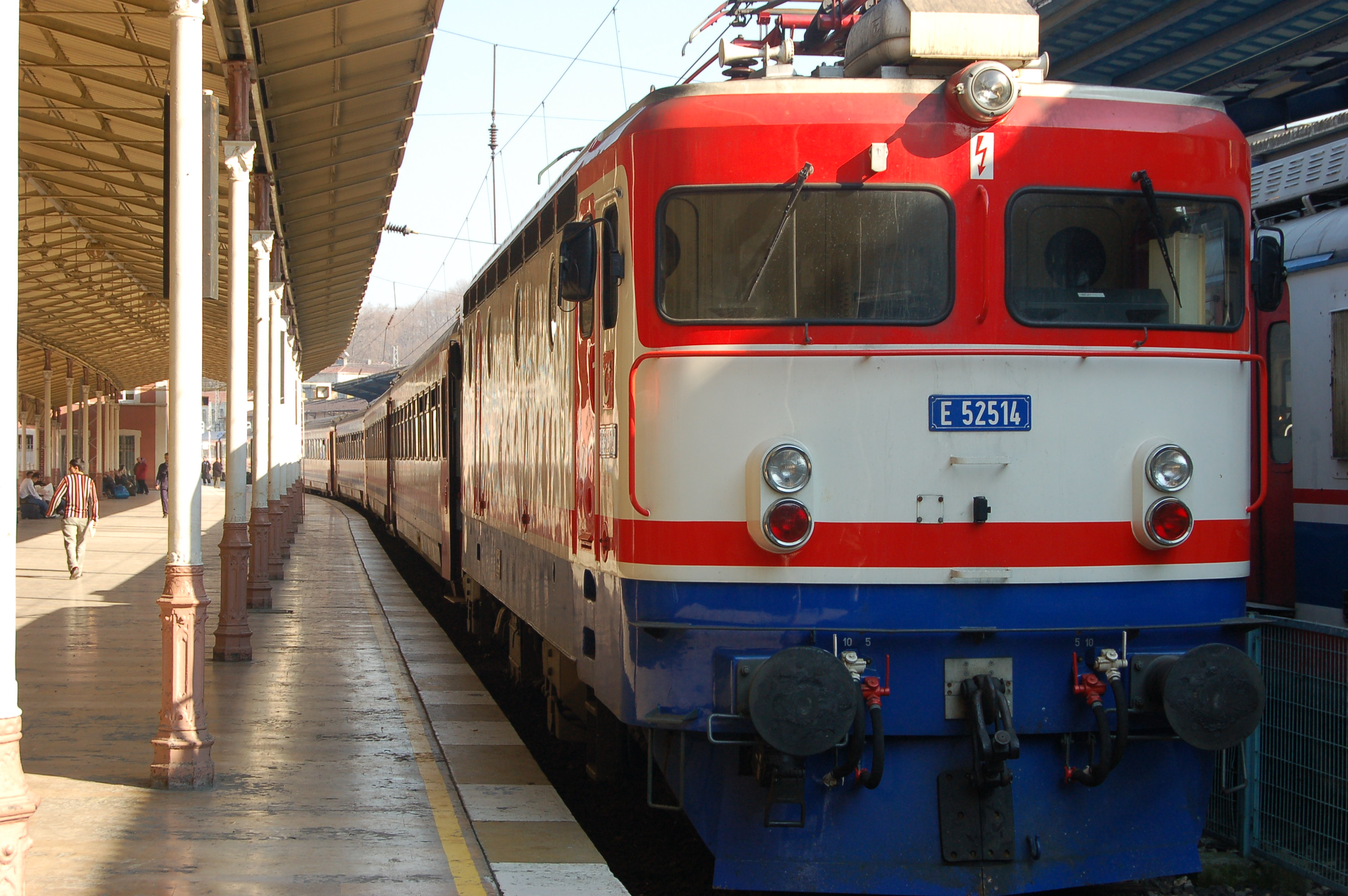
Express train pulled by E52514 arrived at Sirkeci Terminal, Istanbul

The locomotives were originally built from 1967 onwards for Yugoslav Railways by ASEA of Sweden and Končar in Croatia, then part of Yugoslavia. They were based on ASEA's Rb design for Swedish Railways.

The first fifteen locomotives were delivered to TCDD in 1998, followed by five more in 1999 and two in 2004 and 2005 respectively. They have been modernised by having the diodes replaced with thyristor rectifiers, making them similar to the Rc, the thyristor-based successor to the Rb.

Two units were scrapped after the Tavşancıl accident in 2004. The two replacement units delivered in 2004-05 have higher top speeds that the other units, who could only run at 140 km/h.

These locomotives were withdrawn from TCDD on 3 April 2011, upon finish of the lease contract. The last 8 sets were taken out from the fleet in 2014.
