= JŽ series 813 =

JŽ 813
- In service: 1937–1964
- Manufacturer: Ganz-MÁVAG
- Constructed: 1934–1937
- Operators: Yugoslav Railways

Specifications
- Train length: 13.86 m (45 ft 5 5/8 in)
- Maximum speed: 60 km/h (37 mph)
- Weight: 18 tonnes (18 long tons; 20 short tons)
- Prime mover(s): Ganz VI Ja R 135/185
- Engine type: Diesel
- Power output: 88 kW (118 hp)
- Track gauge: 1,435 mm (4 ft 8 1/2 in) standard gauge

The JŽ series 813 is a historic vehicle of Yugoslav Railways. It was nicknamed Zec, meaning "Rabbit", due to good speed for that time.

== History ==
- Service start: 1937
- Last year of service: 1967
