= JŽ series 441 =

Class of Yugoslavian electric locomotive

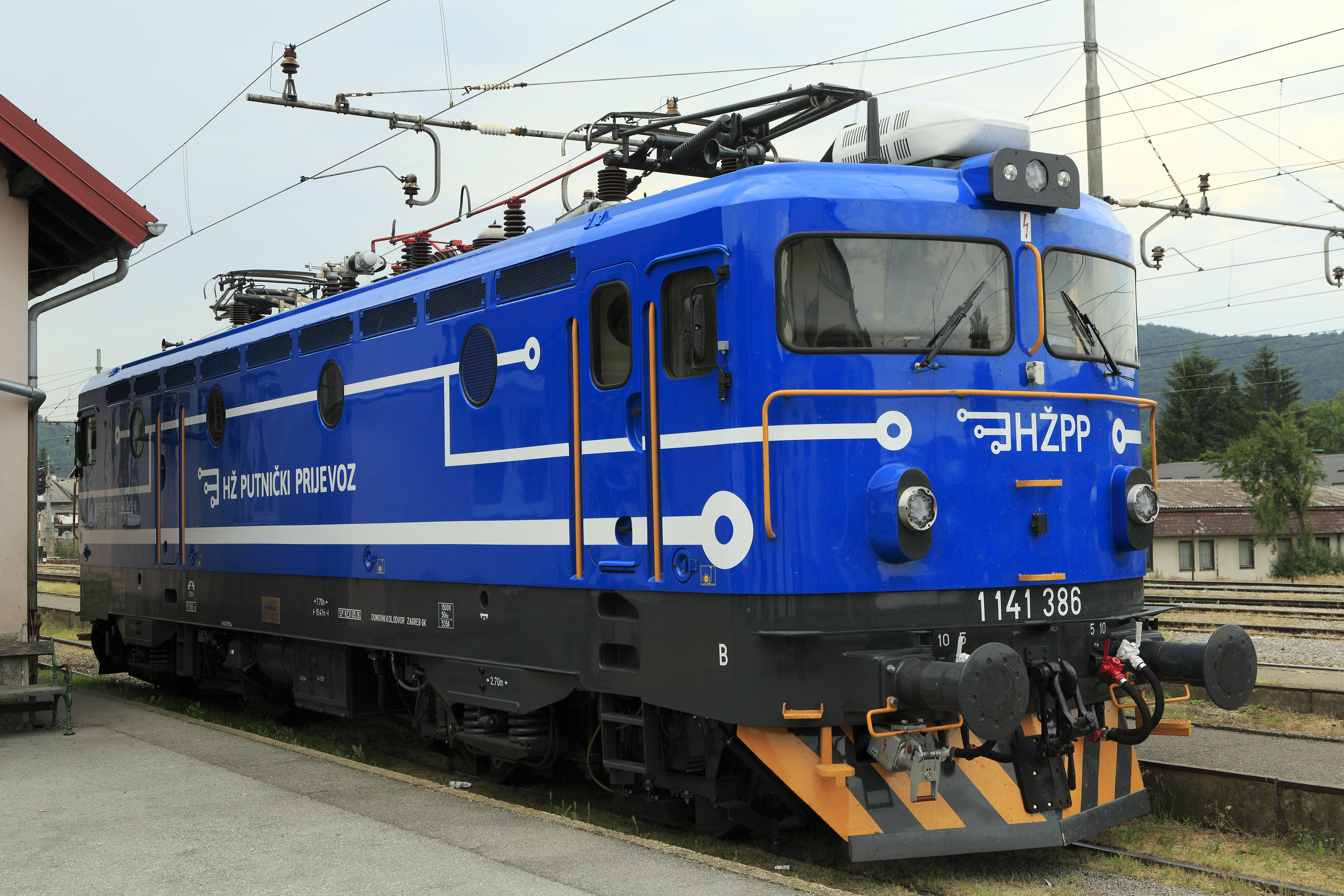
- A renovated HŽ 1141-386 in 2018, sporting LED headlights and a new paint scheme.
Type and origin
- Power type: Electric
- Designer: ASEA
- Builder: 50 Hz Traction Union (ASEA, ELIN, SAAS Sécheron, SGP/Simmering-Graz-Pauker) (1968-1970); Končar Group, TŽV Janko Gredelj, Đuro Đaković, MIN Niš (1970-1987); UCM Reșița, Electroputere Craiova (Socialist Republic of Romanian models only, 1973-1984)
- Build date: 1968 - 1987
- Total produced: 285(48 1141.0,11 1141.1,33 1141.2,25 1141.3,total 117 for HŽ); 130 for Socialist Republic of Romania
Specifications
- Configuration
  - UIC: Bo′Bo′
- Gauge: 1,435 mm (4 ft 8 1/2 in) standard gauge
- Length: 15,500 mm (50 ft 10 in)
- Loco weight: 80 tonnes (79 long tons; 88 short tons)
- Electric system/s: 25 kV 50 Hz AC Catenary
- Current pickup: Pantograph
Performance figures
- Maximum speed: 120 km/h (75 mph) or 140 km/h (87 mph)
- Tractive effort: 275 kN (62,000 lbf)
Career
- Class: JŽ 441, HŽ 1141, ŽRS 441, ŽS 441, ŽFBiH 441, MŽ 441; TCDD E52500; CFR 040-EC (Class 43/44)
- Nicknames: ASEA
- Locale: Bosnia and Herzegovina, Croatia, North Macedonia, Romania, Serbia, Turkey

The JŽ series 441 is an electric locomotive built for Yugoslav Railways. The units are now used by Hrvatske željeznice (HŽ series 1141), Željeznice Federacije Bosne i Hercegovine, Željeznice Republike Srpske, Železnice Srbije and rail transport of TPP Nikola Tesla (ŽS 441), Makedonski Železnici, Turkish State Railways and Romanian Railways-CFR.

== History ==
This series is originally based on the license of the Swedish company ASEA and the SJ Rb locomotive from Sweden. It was produced in order to be used as a universal locomotive, for both passenger and freight traffic on mainline electrified routes. There was also a need to have a powerful electric locomotive to pull freight. Originally, it had diode voltage selector. A later, modernised series, the 3xx subseries, include thyristor voltage selector, and an on-board computer. Later 3xx series have an onboard look-behind-camera for video surveillance of the sides and also new livery.

== Voltage ==
This locomotive utilises 25 kV/50 Hz AC.

== Gearing ==
Depending on subseries, 1xx, 2xx or 3xx, different members of this class have a top speed of 120 km/h (75 mph) or 140 km/h (87 mph), depending on the gearing. The more common gearing is the 120 km/h (75 mph) (classes 0xx, 1xx, 2xx, 3xx, 4xx, 5xx, 8xx) intended for freight and passenger trains, while the 140 km/h (87 mph) (classes 6xx and 7xx), intended for passenger services, was only installed in the final batch of series 441 locomotives (consisting of the 6xx and 7xx subseries). The models with higher maximum speed have lower tractive power and are used for passenger or light freight trains only, whereas the models with lower maximum speed have high tractive power and are thus able to pull heavy freight trains.

== Variants ==
Sub Class	Weight	Maximum Speed	Electric Brake	Flange Lubrication	Multiple Working	HŽ (1141)	ŽFBH	ŽRS	ŽS	MŽ	Total Built	Reference
441.0	78 t	120 km/h	no	no	no	42	31	14	24	5	124	
441.3	80 t	120 km/h	yes	no	yes		6	3	17		26	
441.4	80 t	120 km/h	yes	yes	yes	10	9	2	13		24	
441.5	78 t	120 km/h	no	yes	no	4	3	5	19	1	32	
441.6	82 t	140 km/h	no	yes	no				6		14	
441.7	82 t	140 km/h	no	yes	yes	35			10	2	55	
441.8	78 t	140 km/h	yes	yes	no		3	7			10	
Total						91	52	31	89	8	271/285	

== Liveries ==
Original livery of Yugoslav Railways was red (occasionally orange) and blue with white stripe and "Jugoslovenske železnice" inscription on it. Serbian Railways class 441 units were later recolored into a red and grey livery. Post-overhaul units owned by Srbija Voz are colored in the new "swoosh" livery shared with Stadler FLIRT EMUs, while unoverhauled and Srbija Kargo units retain the red and grey color scheme.

Locomotives of Republika Srpska have similar livery as the original Yugoslav, but with faded colours and a white stripe between blue and red.

In Croatia, there are three basic liveries. The standard one is the red with white stripe. There is also a very rare livery, in colours similar to Croatian flag. The third, newest livery is the HŽ official livery (red and grey with blue stripe).

The Romanian Railways' original livery was in grey with a red or blue stripe, some examples even with the Romanian tricolor flag used instead of the blue or red stripe (similar case to a few members of EA class), but after 2000, the traditional white-red (front ends) livery has been applied. A reversed variation of it appeared on the 3 Class 46 locomotives modernized in Croatia, whilst for the rest Class 46 members, the livery is similar to the ones applied on the Class 47 locomotives.

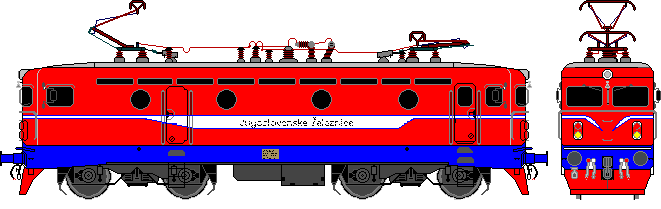
Sketch of the original Yugoslav Railways livery

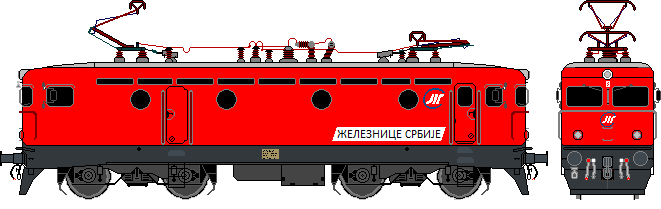
Serbian Railways standard livery

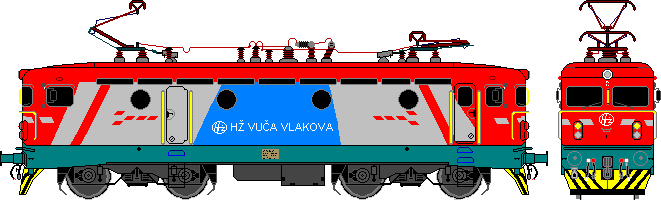
Sketch of the new "HŽ vuča vlakova" livery

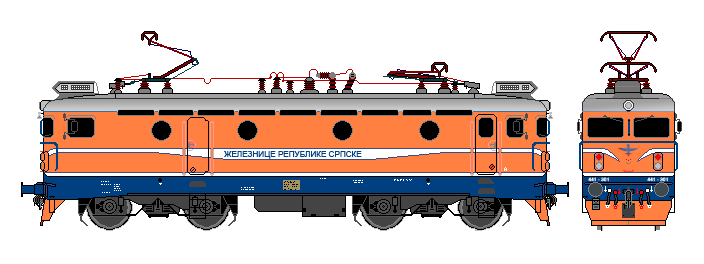
ŽRS standard livery

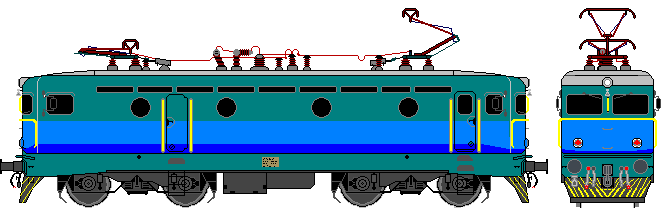
Sketch of the ŽFBiH special livery

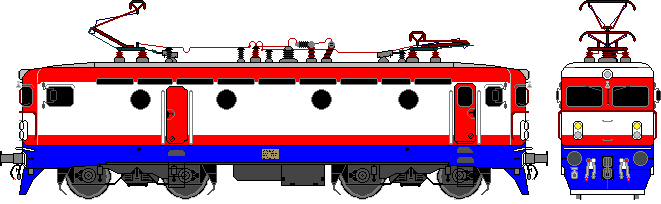
Sketch of the ŽFBiH livery

== Export ==
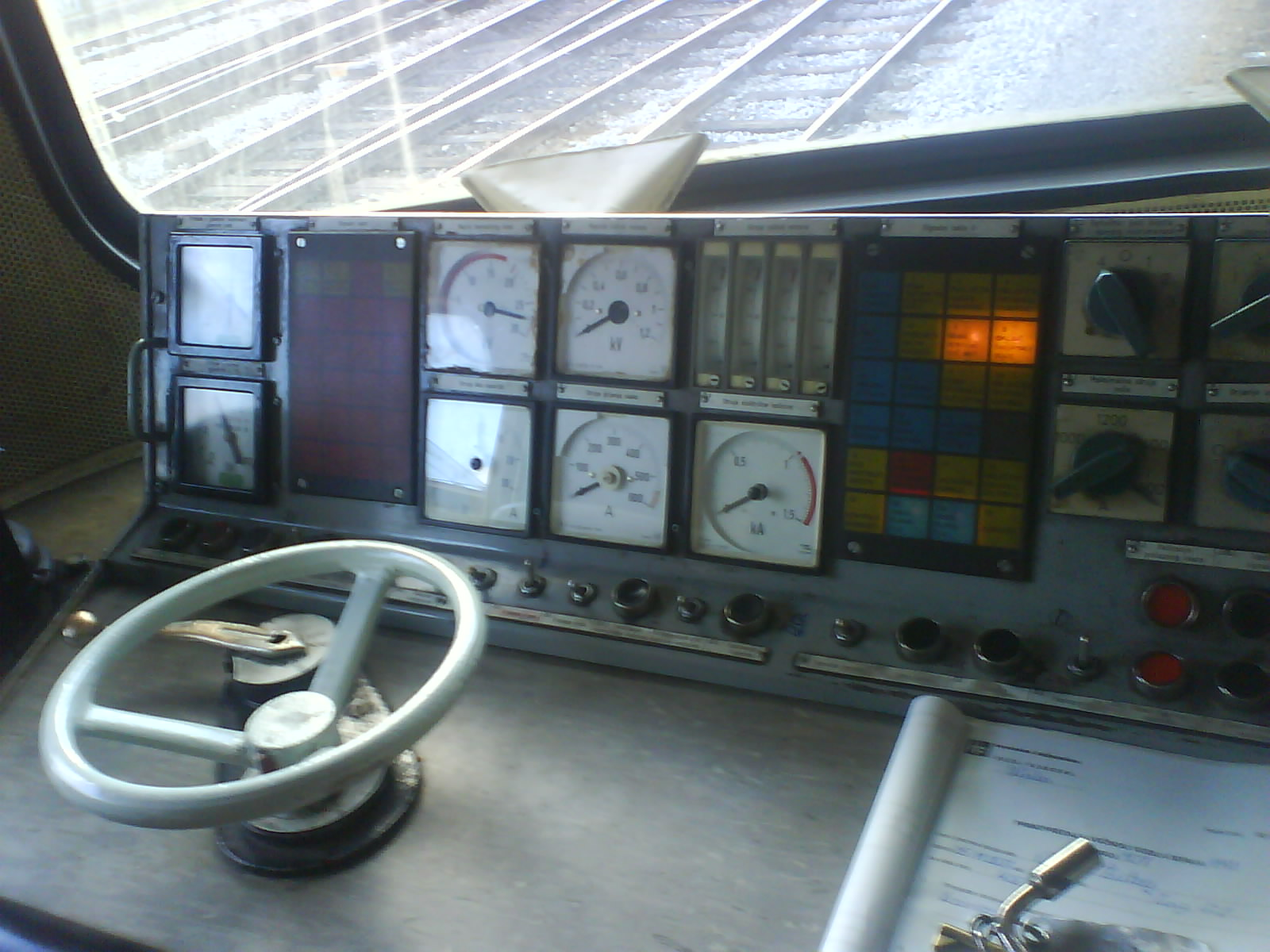
Driver's desk of a 1141

Starting with 1972, between Yugoslavia and Romania a convention was concluded for reciprocal delivery for locomotives. It also involved the Romanian companies Electroputere Craiova and UCM Reşiţa. Thus the Romanian party delivered to Yugoslavia a number of 103 Co’Co locomotives of the 461 JŽ series and sub-assemblies for 130 Bo’Bo locomotives of the 441 JŽ series, delivered to Romania and registered with CFR under the number 040-EC (Class 43) between 1973 and 1984. The Yugoslavian locomotives derived directly from the already renowned prototype ASEA RB1 improved in the mechanical construction under the RC1 series pattern. A number of locomotives have been modernised to Class 46, initially 3 units by Končar Group, and later by PROMAT and Softronic Craiova. Class 46 is also a number used by Class 43/44 locomotives that were reclassified after being renumbered into UIC system, though with no modernisation what so ever. The Class 44 (040-EC1) is the same as Class 43, but modified for higher speeds (160 km/h).

Since the dissolution of SFRY, this locomotive is also exported. Some pieces are in North Macedonia, and some were leased to Turkish Railways (as TCDD E52500 class). Now, most of the former Republics which have been formed after the dissolving of Yugoslavia have some of these locomotives, inherited from the former JŽ. These units have different designations, but very similar characteristics.

== In popular culture ==
One example made an appearance coming out of a tunnel towards the end of the movie Force 10 From Navarone. This is anachronistic as the movie took place during World War II.

== Gallery ==
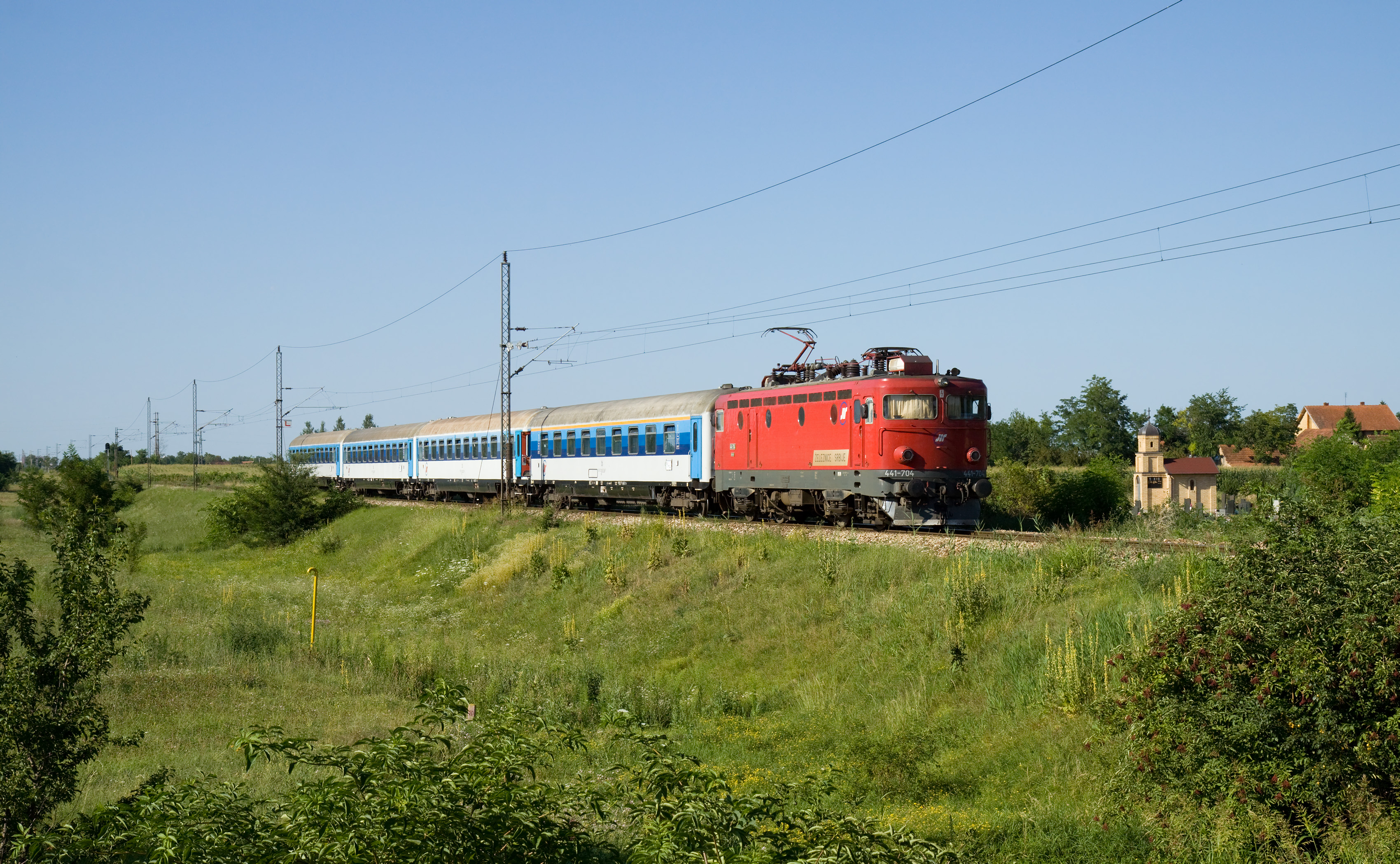
Serbian Railways' unrefurbished 441-704 between Subotica and Novi Sad

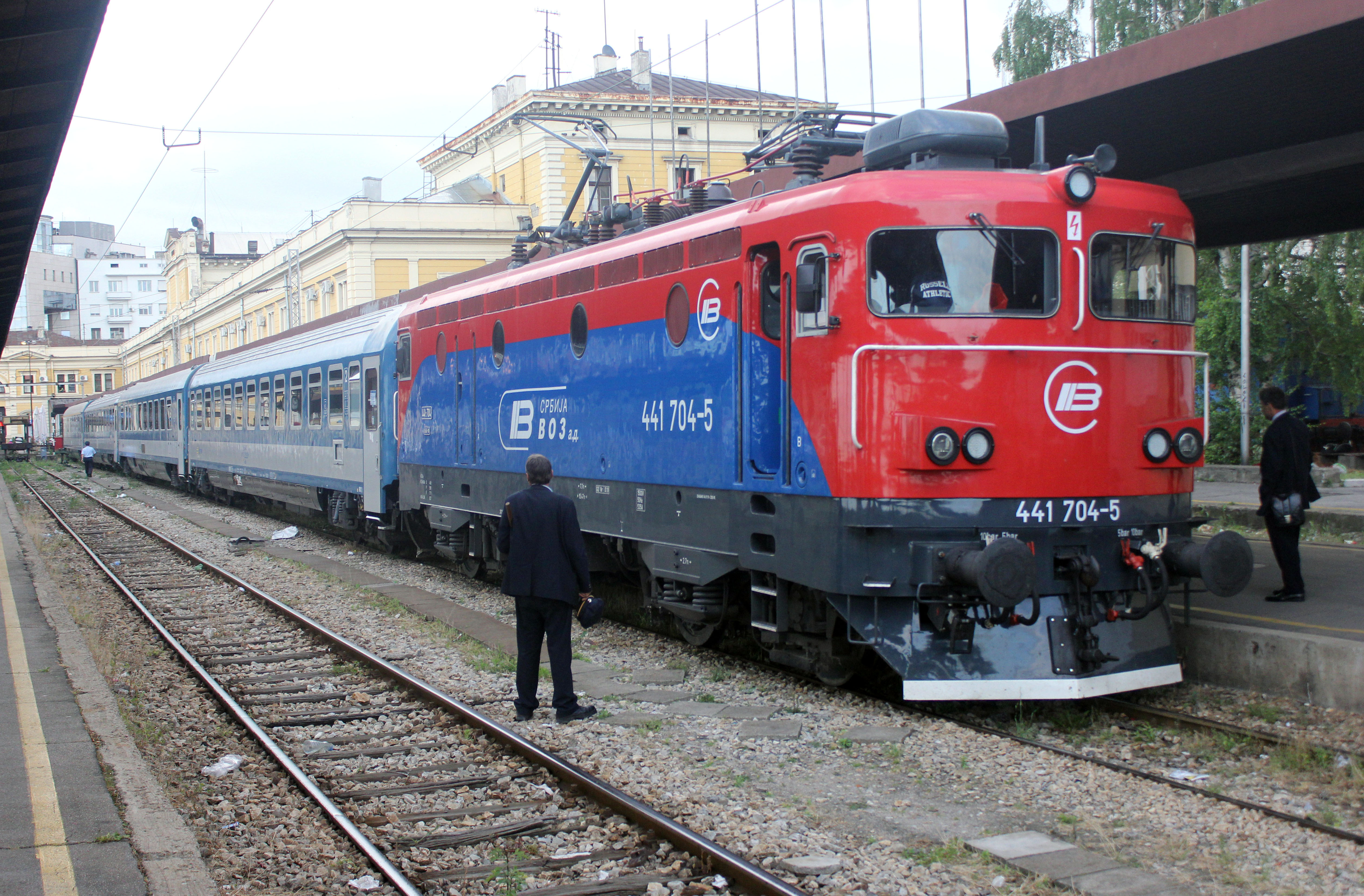
Serbian Railways' refurbished 441-704 at Belgrade Main before closure

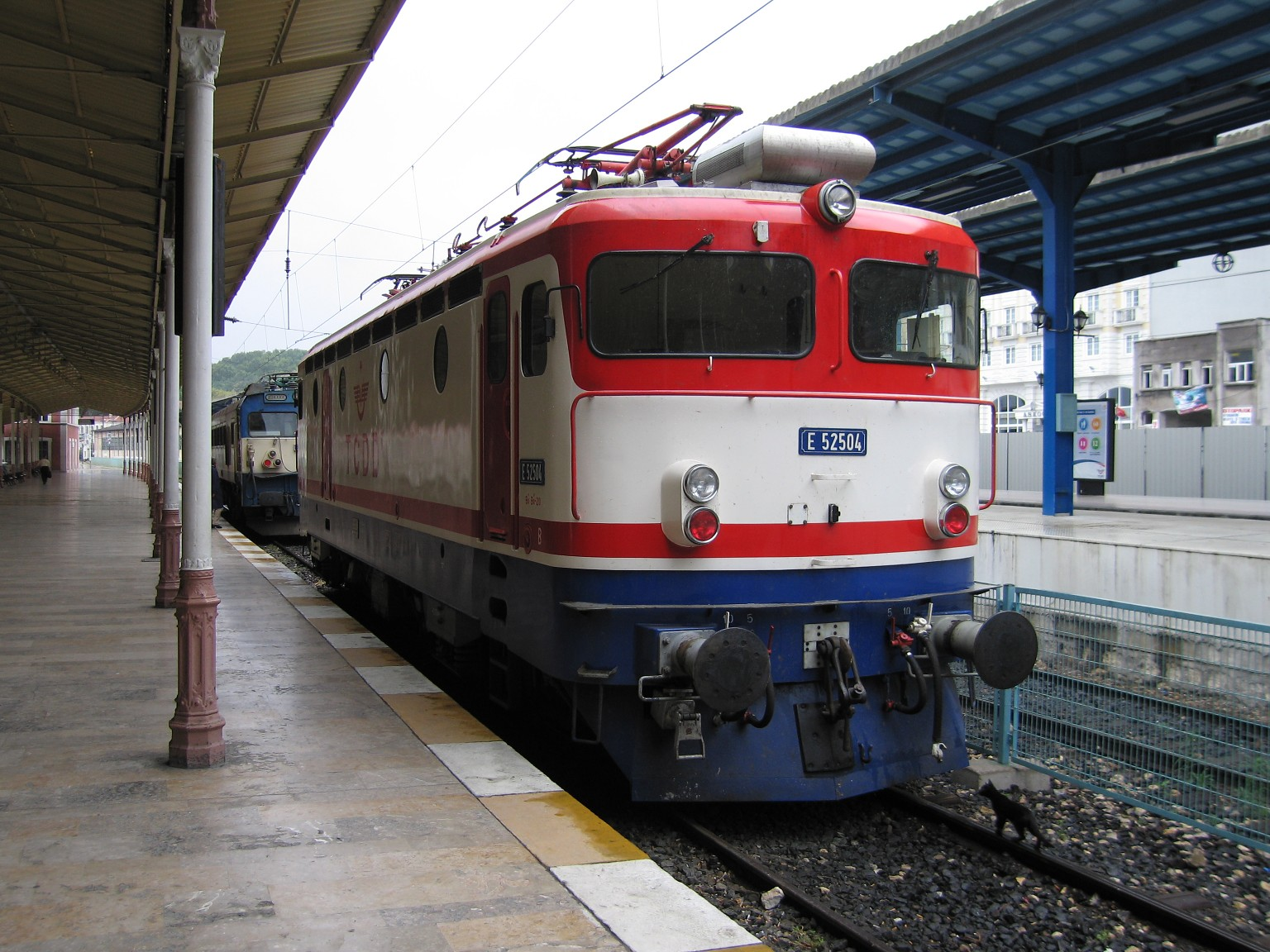
The same series (modified and renumbered) at Turkish National Railways.

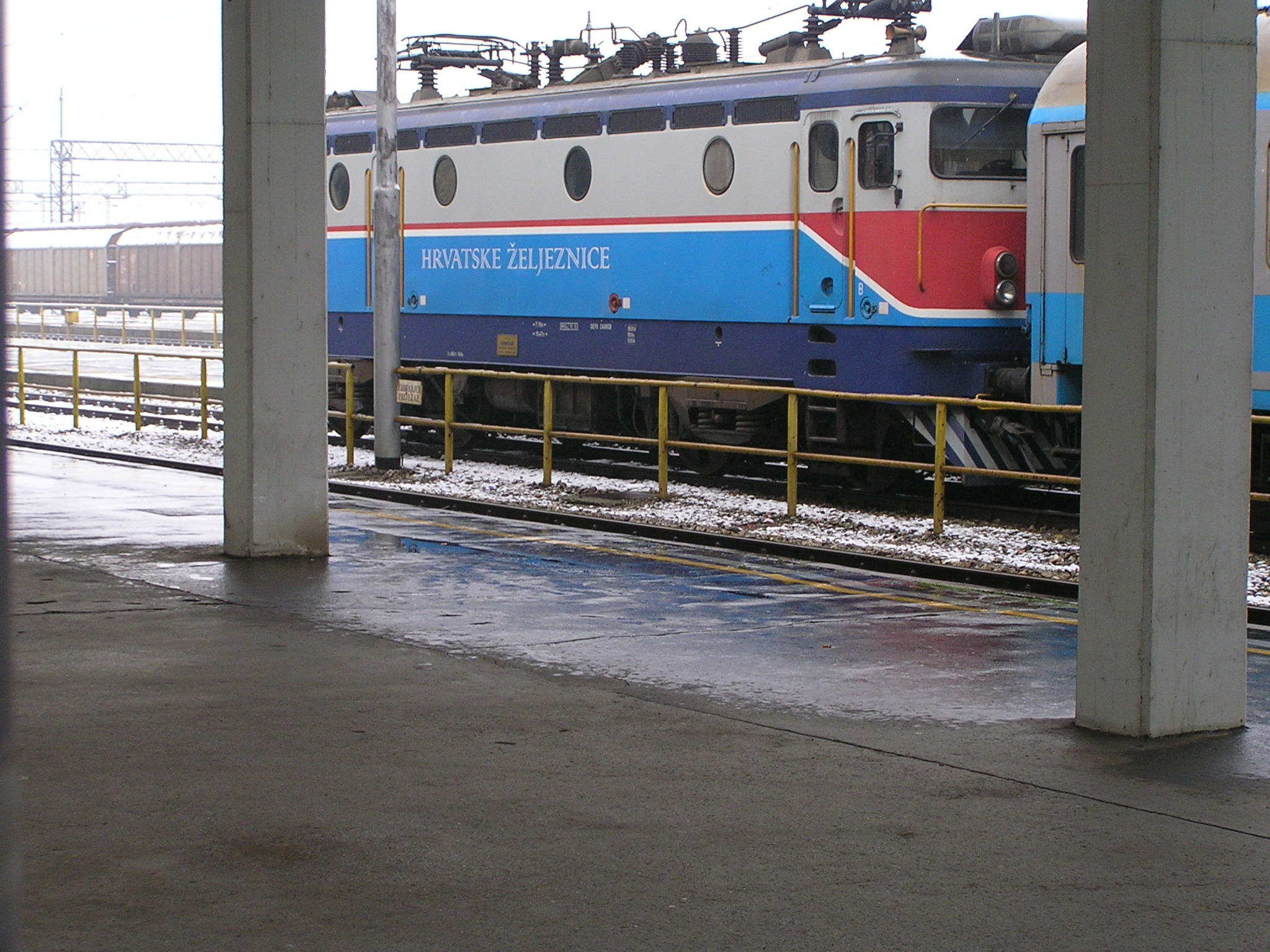
Alternative, rare livery.

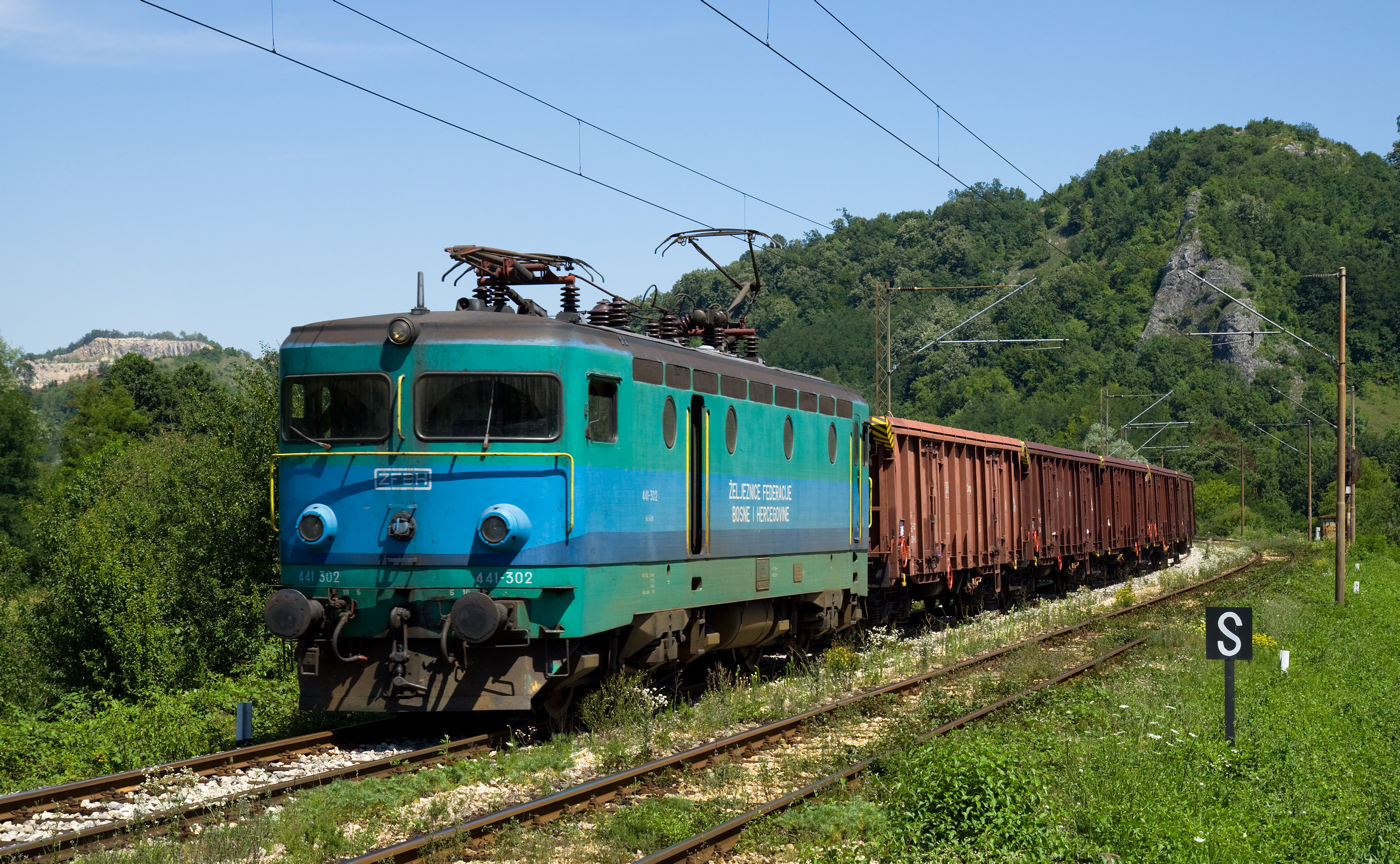
ŽFBH class 441

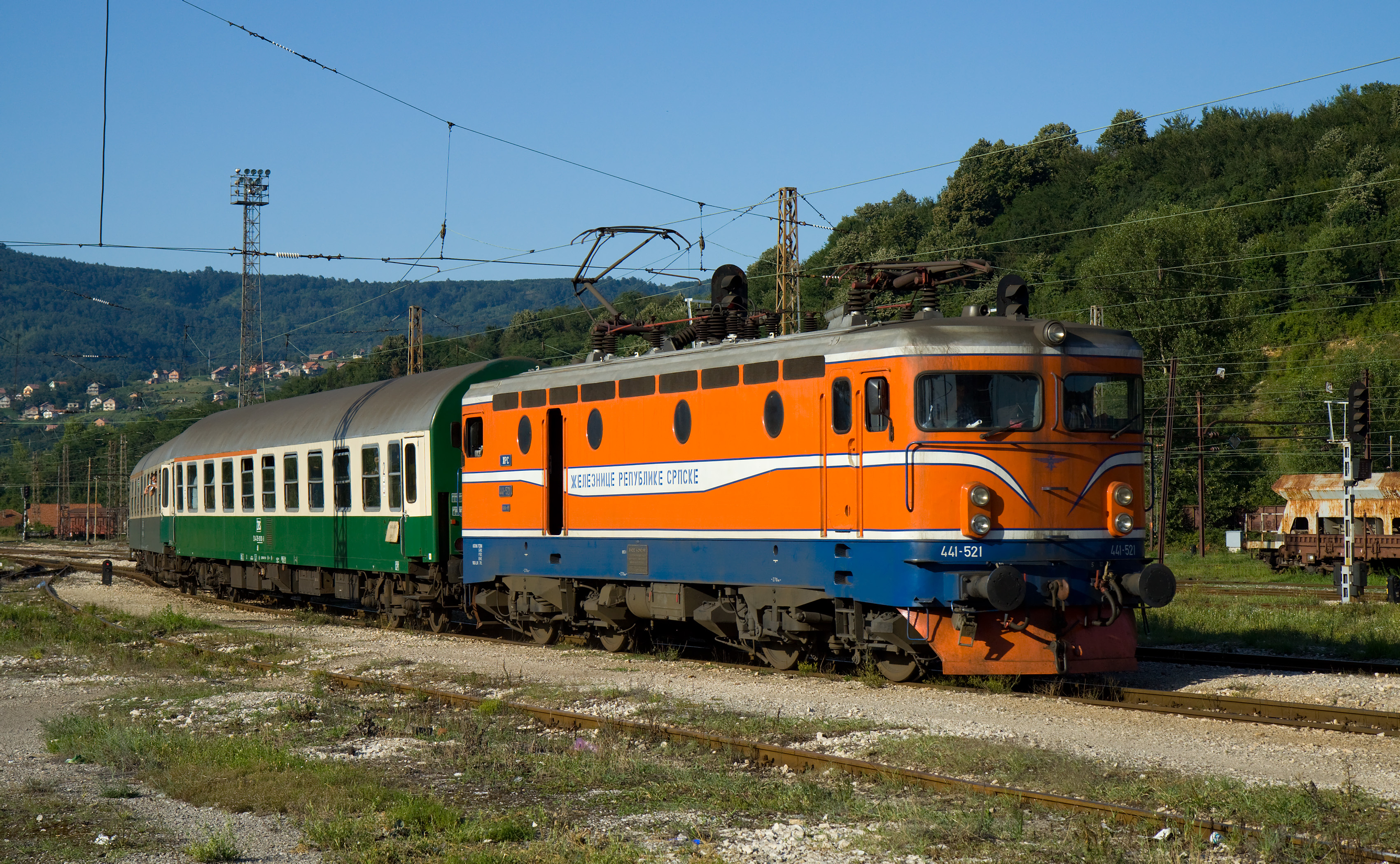
ŽRS class 441

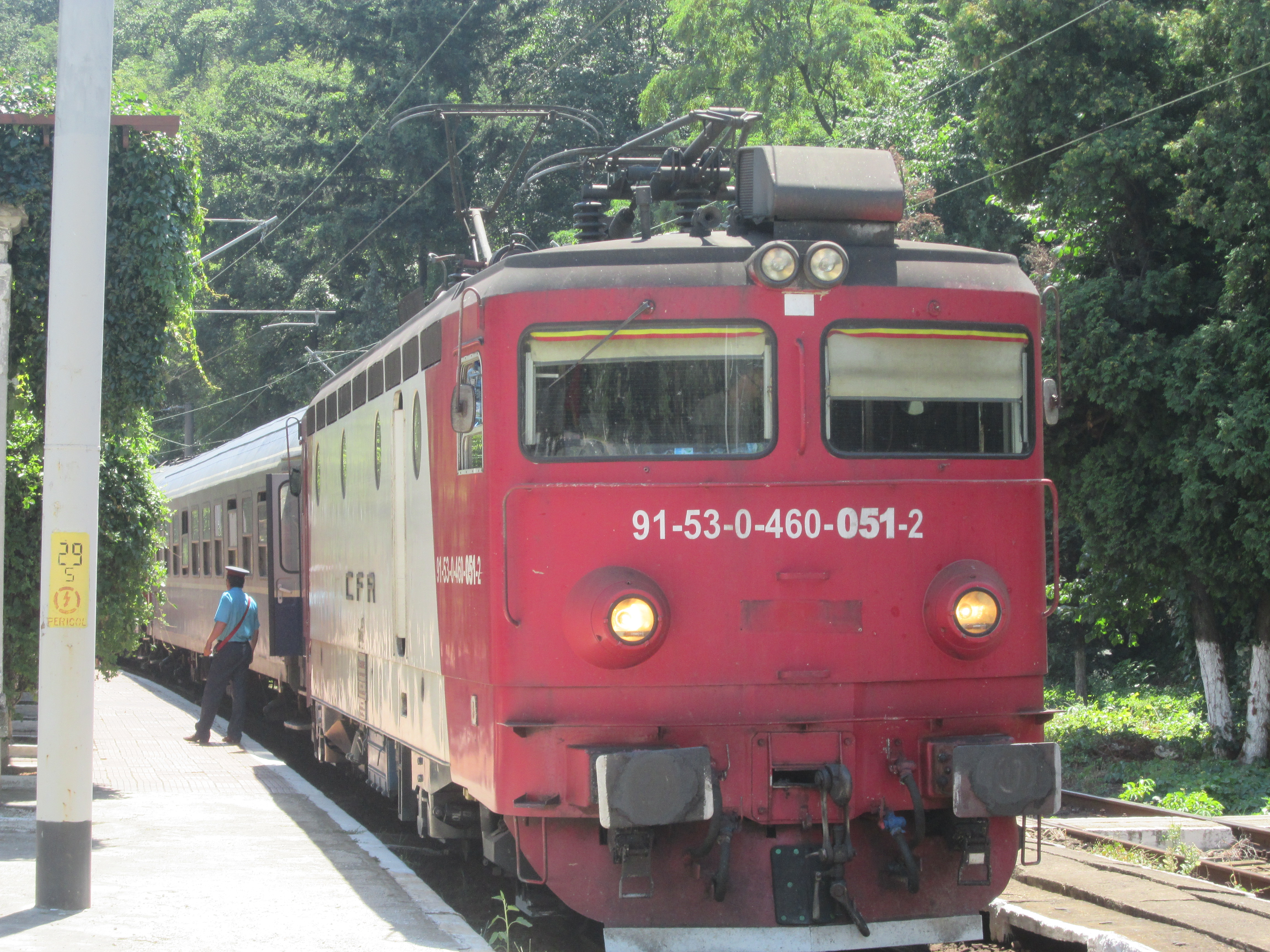
CFR Class 43 (here seen as reclassified into Class 46)

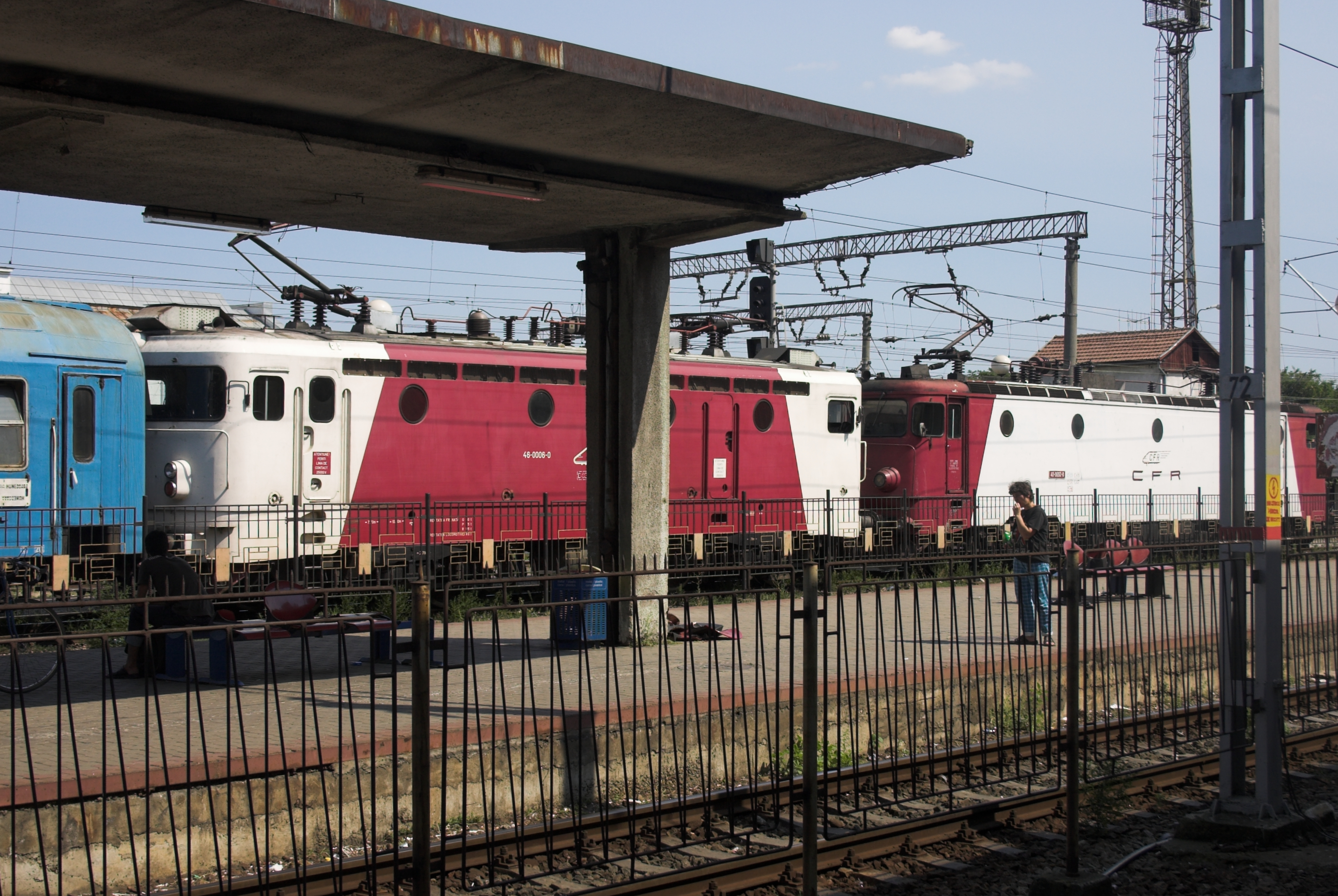
CFR Class 46 (Končar modernisation)

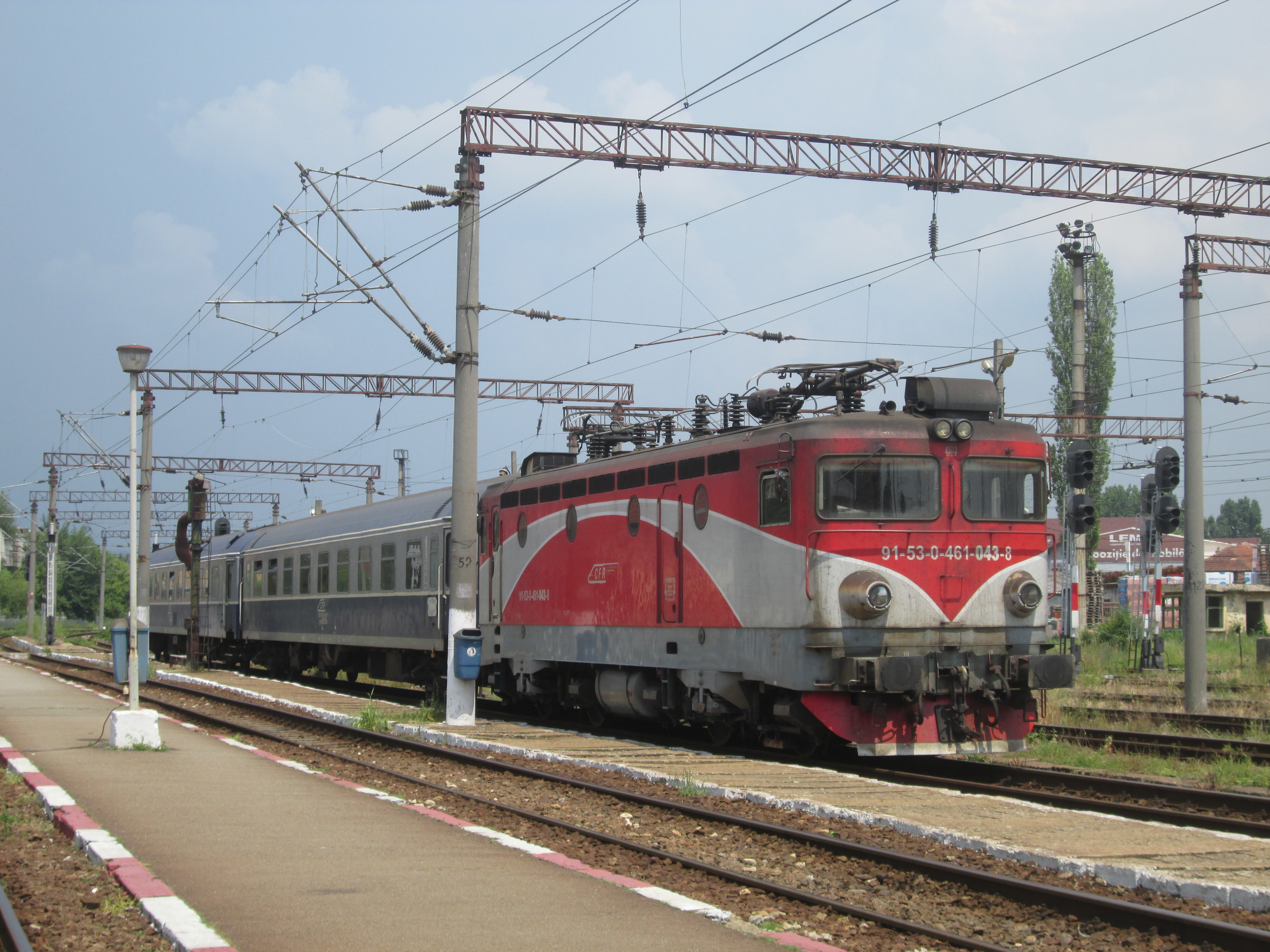
CFR Class 46 (PROMAT modernisation)

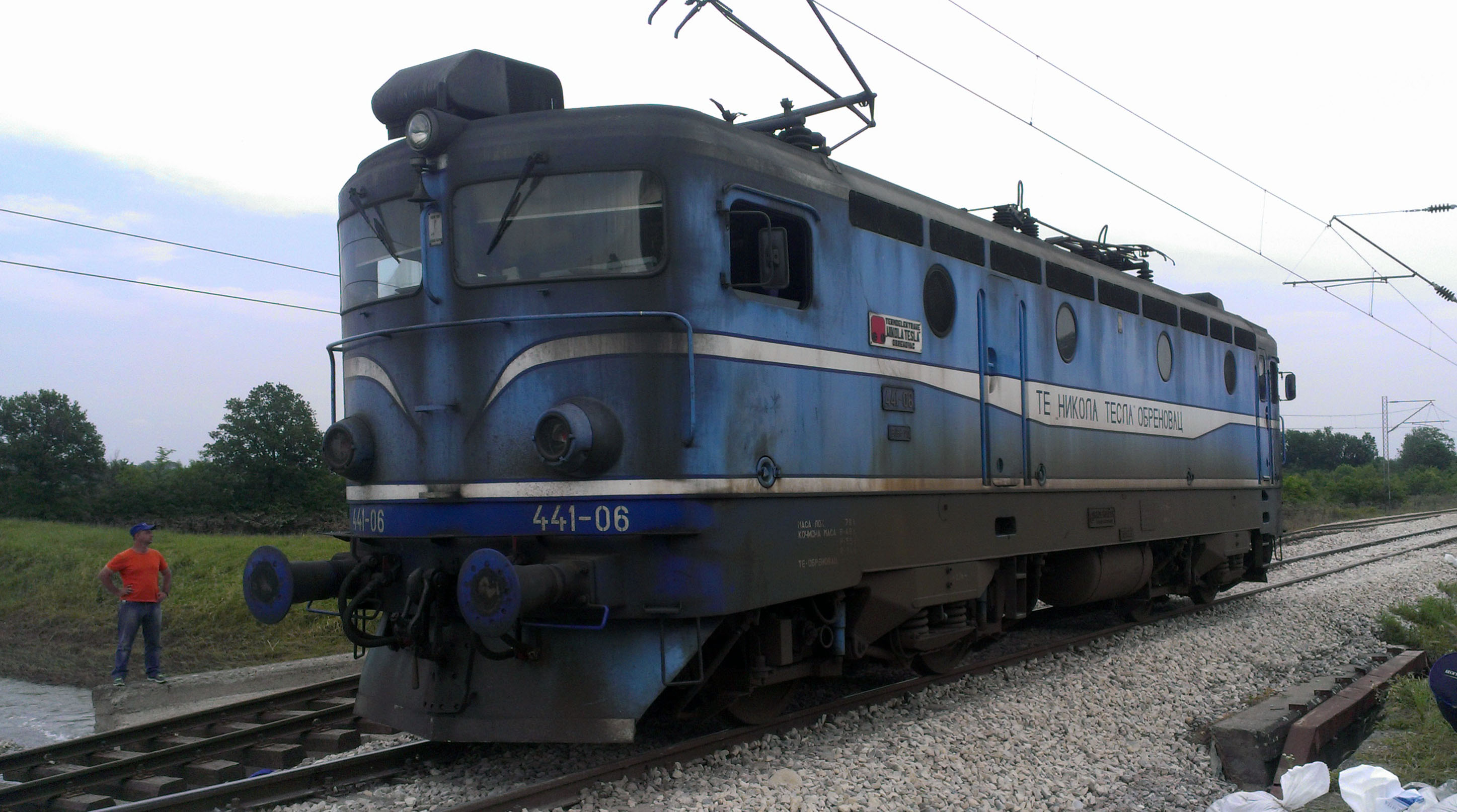
TENT Class 441

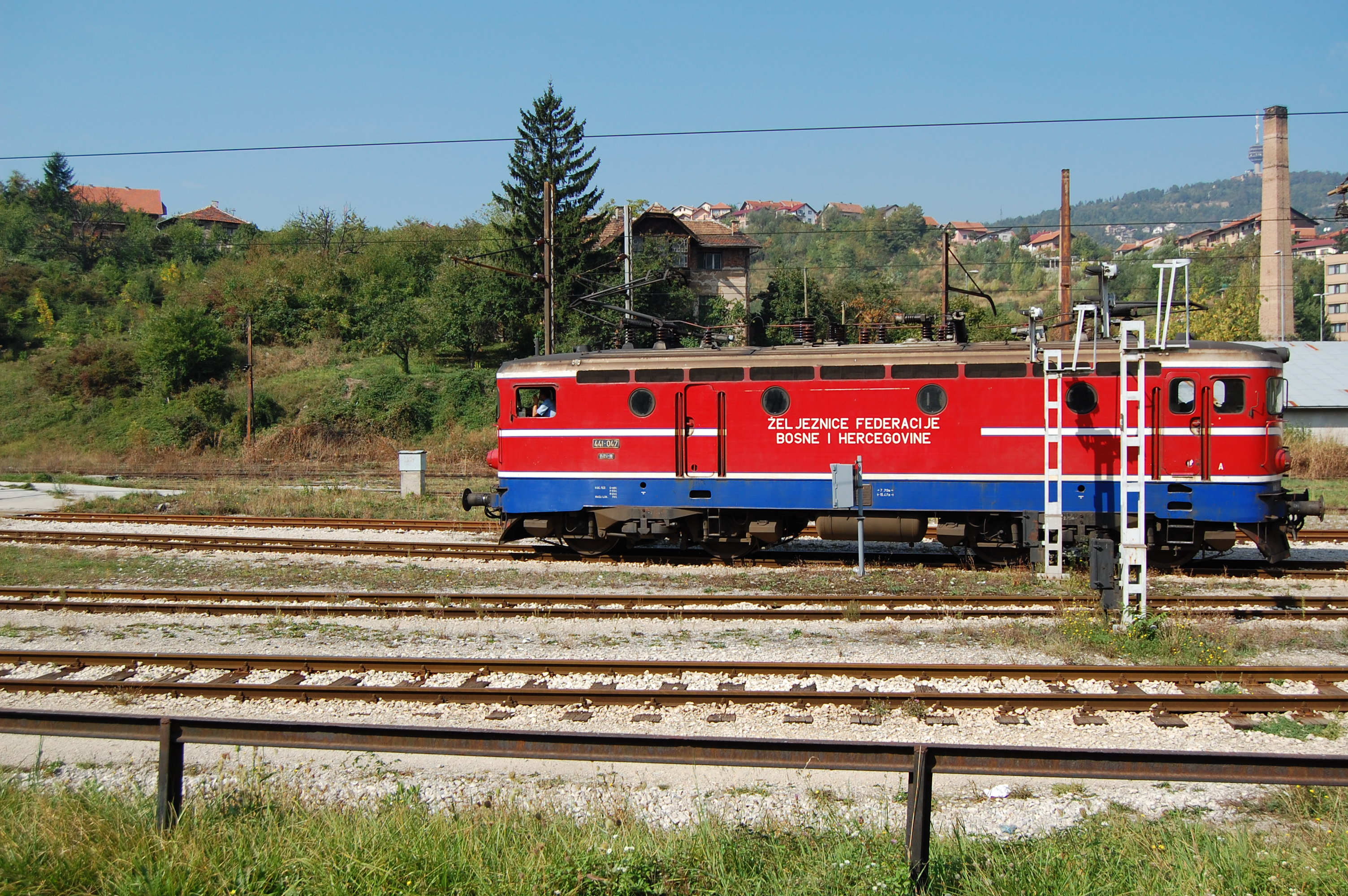
ŽFBH 441-047 at Sarajevo, October 1, 2011

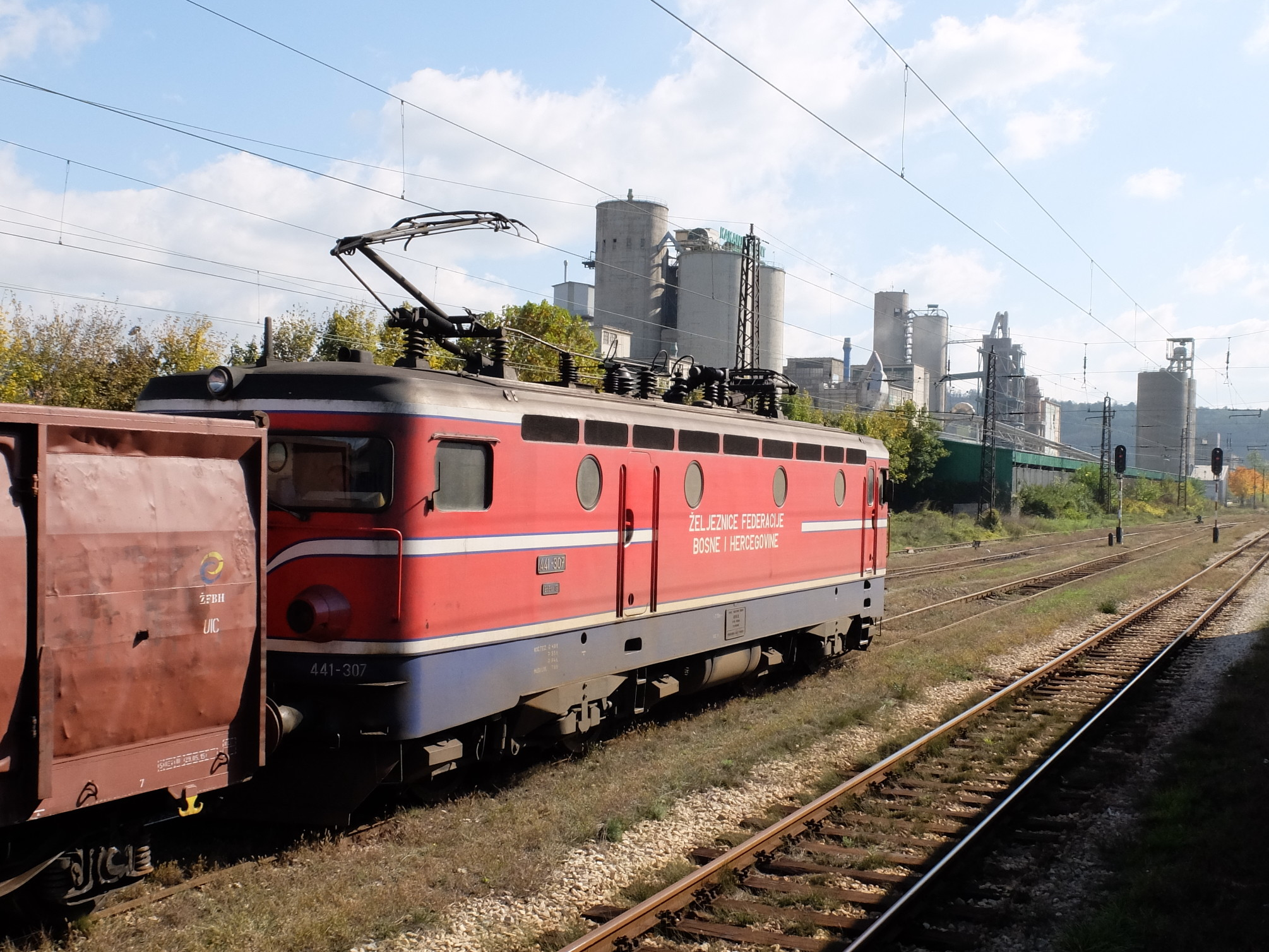
ŽFBH 441-307 (Kakanj)

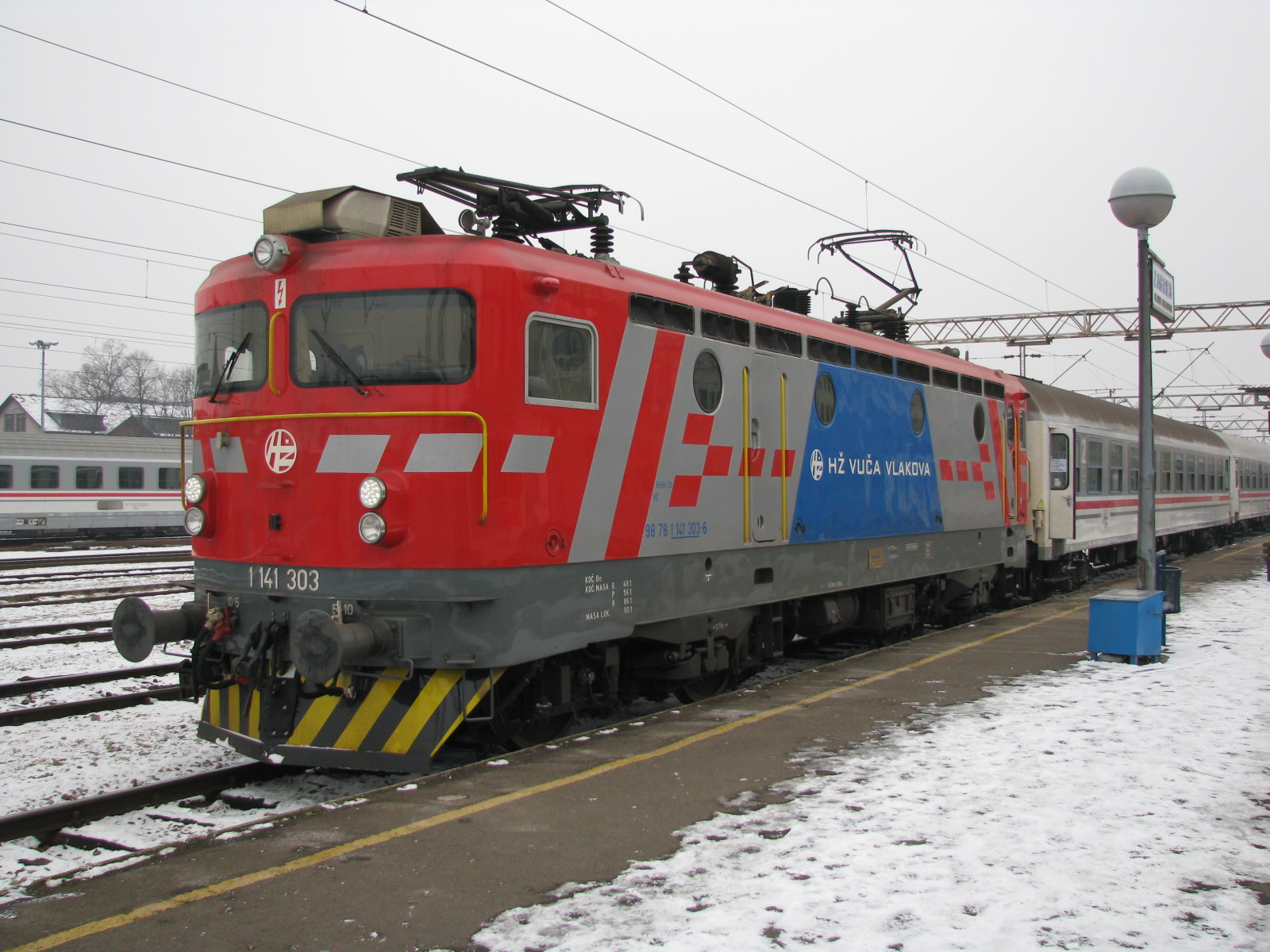
HŽ 1 141 303, older livery

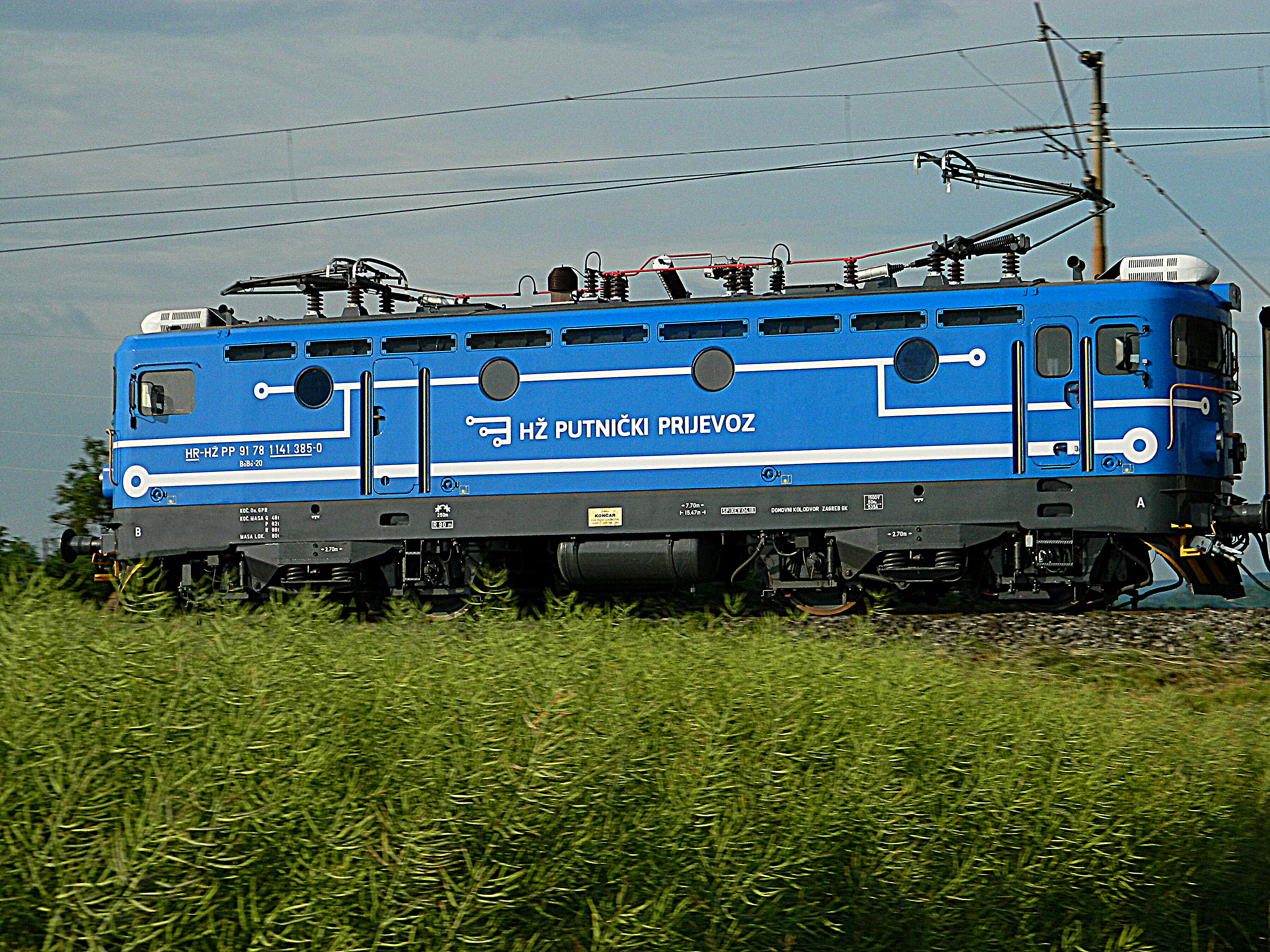
HŽPP series 1141, new livery in blue
