= SJ Rb =

Rb
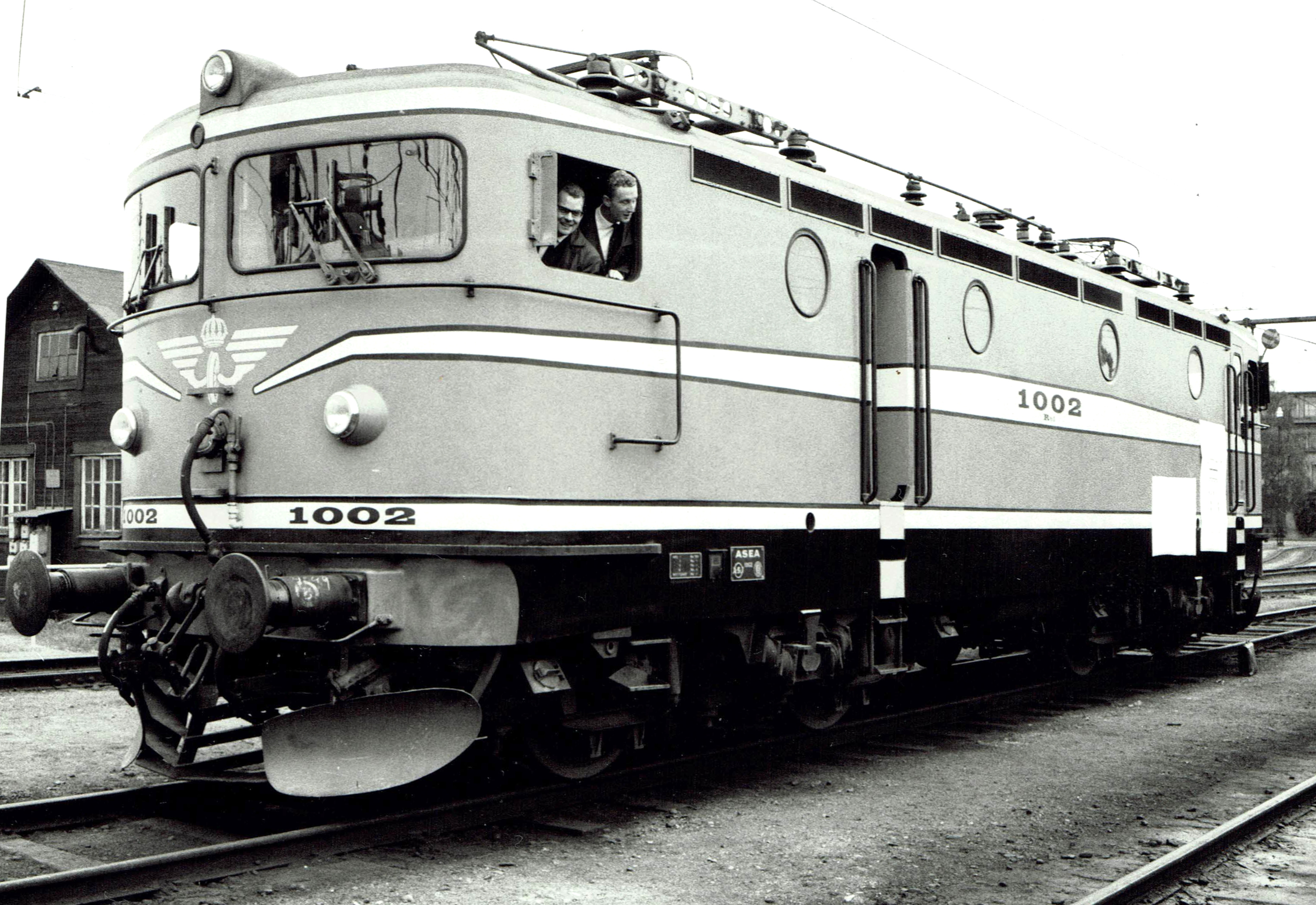
- Rb 1002 in Hagalund station, 1964
Type and origin
- Power type: Electric
- Builder: ASEA (Electrical part); Svenska Järnvägsverkstäderna (Rb1), NOHAB (Rb2), Motala Verkstad (Rb3) (Mechanical part)
- Build date: 1962
- Total produced: 6
Specifications
- Configuration
  - UIC: Bo′Bo′
- Gauge: 1,435 mm (4 ft 8 1/2 in)
- Length: 15,470 mm (50 ft 9 1/16 in)
- Loco weight: 74.4 tonnes (73.2 long tons; 82.0 short tons) (Rb1); 73.6 tonnes (72.4 long tons; 81.1 short tons) (Rb2); 75.2 tonnes (74.0 long tons; 82.9 short tons) (Rb3)
- Electric system/s: 15 kV 16 2/3 Hz AC Catenary
- Current pickup(s): Pantograph
Performance figures
- Maximum speed: 120 km/h (75 mph)
- Power output: 3,200 kW (4,300 hp)
Career
- Operators: Statens Järnvägar
- Numbers: 1001-1006
- Retired: 1974-1976

Rb is an electric locomotive operated by Swedish State Railways (Swedish: Statens Järnvägar, SJ). Six locomotives were built by ASEA, in three series designated Rb1, Rb2 or Rb3.

== History ==
During the 1950s SJ saw the need for a new universal locomotive, since the D-series was aging. In 1955 the Ra-series had proved successful with bogie wheels. At the same time there was interest to make a locomotive that could be exported abroad. The result was an agreement between ASEA and SJ where six test engines were delivered. The testing of the Rb was successful, so it was sent to Romania for trials in 1963 for the Brasov-Predeal mainline (at the time it was electrified since 9 June 1963 and 3 more manufacturers tested their locomotives there), and later in Yugoslavia in 1967, and based on this exports were made to the Yugoslav Railways (JŽ class 441 and 461), Căile Ferate Române of Romania (CFR Class EA and EC) and for Norwegian Railways (NSB El 15, derived from the EA class of CFR). The result of the testing of the Rb1T unit was the Rc locomotive that was produced in 360 copies starting from 1967 and ending in 1988/1989 for SJ, in addition to export to Amtrak (AEM-7), Norges Statsbaner (NSB El 16) and Österreichische Bundesbahnen (ÖBB Class 1043). The Rb-series was in use on passenger and freight trains until the mid-1970s. Parts of unit 1005 were reused in a maintenance-of-way vehicle that was scrapped in 1996 or 2004.

== Variations ==
Rb1 was equipped with direct current (DC) motors with higher efficiency and thus more economical. The utilization of thyristors could convert from the alternating current (AC) used in the railway electrification system of Sweden, and one of the Rb1 locos was rebuilt to thyristor in 1965, getting the designation Rb1T. They were built by AB ASJ (AB Svenska Järnvägsverkstäderna or Swedish Rail Workshops).

Rb2 and Rb3 were equipped with conventional AC motors. Rb2 was built by Nydqvist och Holm Aktiebolag whilst Rb3 was built by the Motala Workshops.
