= Railways of Republika Srpska =

Railway company of Republika Srpska, Bosnia and Herzegovina

- Official logo
- Company type: Railway
- Industry: Rail Transport
- Founded: 12 May 1992; 34 years ago
- Headquarters: Banja Luka and Doboj, Republika Srpska, Bosnia and Herzegovina
- Key people: Dragan Savanović
- Services: Rail Transport, Rail Construction, Services
- Revenue: ▼€34.06 million (2016)
- Net income: ▲ (€8.27 million) (2016)
- Total assets: ▼€433.05 million (2016)
- Total equity: ▼€71.58 million (2016)
- Owner: Government of Republika Srpska (63.92%); Others
- Number of employees: 3,082 (2016)
- Website: Official website

Railways of Republika Srpska (Serbian: Жељезнице Републике Српске, romanized: Željeznice Republike Srpske; abbr. ЖРС or ŽRS) is the railway company of Republika Srpska, Bosnia and Herzegovina. It is one of the two rail companies in the country (the other is the ŽFBH, operating in the Federation of Bosnia and Herzegovina). The company operates 424 kilometres (263 mi) of railroad.

== History ==
The company was established around 1991 as Željeznice Srpske, from the Bosnian elements of Yugoslav Railways. The company was renamed Željeznice Republike Srpske after the Dayton Accord formally formed Republika Srpska.

== Organizational chart ==
- Dragan Savanović (Director General)
- Dragan Subašić (Exec. Dir. for Infrastructure)
- Draženko Todorović (Exec. Dir. for Railway Operations)
- Branislav Đurica (Executive Director for Economy Affairs)
- Milenko Bilić (Exec. Dir. for Legal Affairs and Human Resources)

== Rolling stock ==
=== Electrical Locomotives ===
Designation	Producer	Total units	Power output(kwh)	UIC classification of locomotive axle arrangements	Top speed	Building years	Notes	Image
ŽRS 441	Rade Končar Zagreb	35	3800 kW	Bo'Bo'	120 km/h (140 km/h)	1969–1988		

=== Diesel Locomotives ===
Designation	Producer	Total units	Type	Power output in kwh	UIC classification of locomotive axle arrangements	Top speed	Building years	Notes	Image
ŽRS 642	Brissonneau et Lotz; Đuro Đaković Slavonski Brod	3	Diesel electric shunter	606 kW	Bo'Bo'	80 km/h	1960–1964		
ŽRS 643	Brissonneau et Lotz; Đuro Đaković Slavonski Brod	2	Diesel electric shunter	680 kW	Bo'Bo'	80 km/h	1967		
Rh 2062	Jenbacher Werke	3	Diesel electric			km/h	19		
ŽRS 661	GM-EMD; Đuro Đaković Slavonski Brod	22	Diesel electric	1454 kW	Co'Co'	114 km/h (124 km/h)	1960–1971	Several units on loan to Serbian Railways	

=== Electric Multiple Unit ===
Designation	Producer	Total units	Power output in kwh	AAR wheel arrangement	Top speed	Building years	Notes	Image
ŽRS 411	Ganz Mávag	38	1360 kW	2'2'+Bo'Bo'+2'2'	120 km/h	1976–1979	Out of service	

=== Diesel Multiple Unit ===
Designation	Producer	Total units	Power output in kwh	AAR wheel arrangement	Top speed	Building years	Notes	Image
ŽRS 813	FIAT Torino; TVT Maribor	3	294 kW	1A-A1 + 2-2	100 km/h	1973–1976		

=== Wagons ===
ŽRS has made a contract for 200 wagons with Polish company EKK Wagon, which includes workshop equipment. The Wagons are designed to travel at 120 km/h with 22.5 ton axle loads. The order was signed with €20 Million of Polish credit.

== Pictures ==
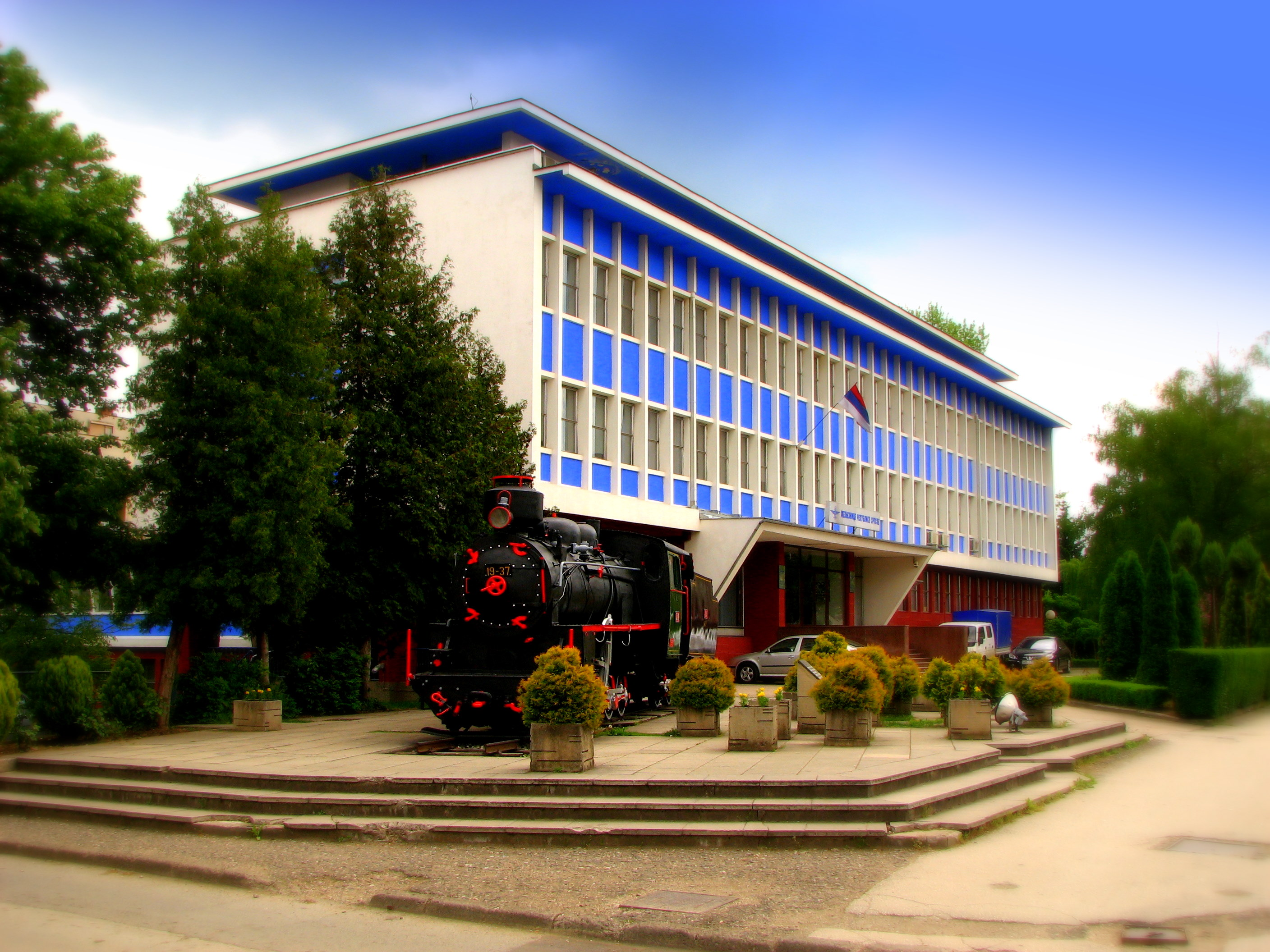
Headquarters

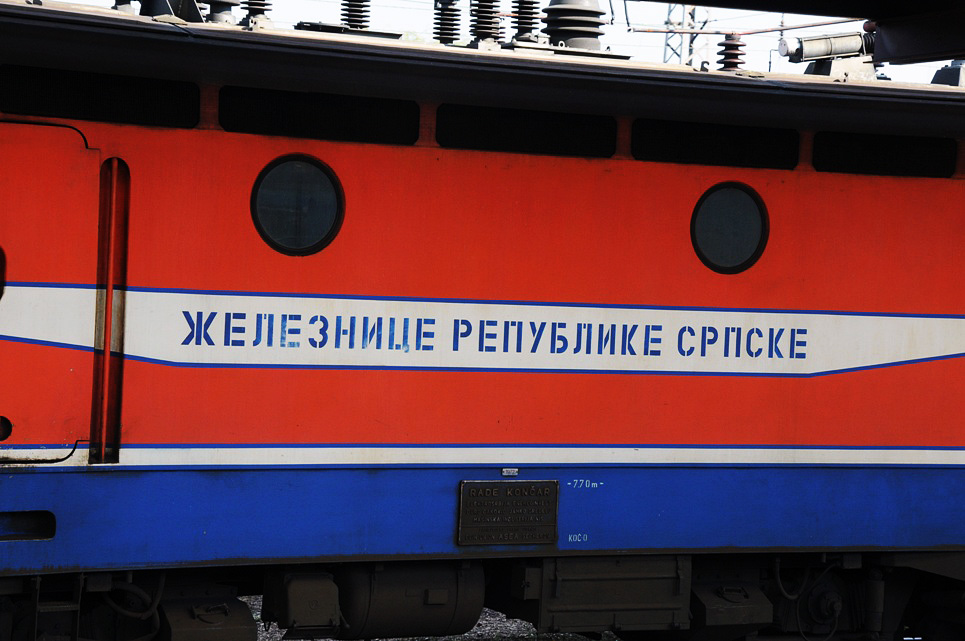
Logo on Class 441

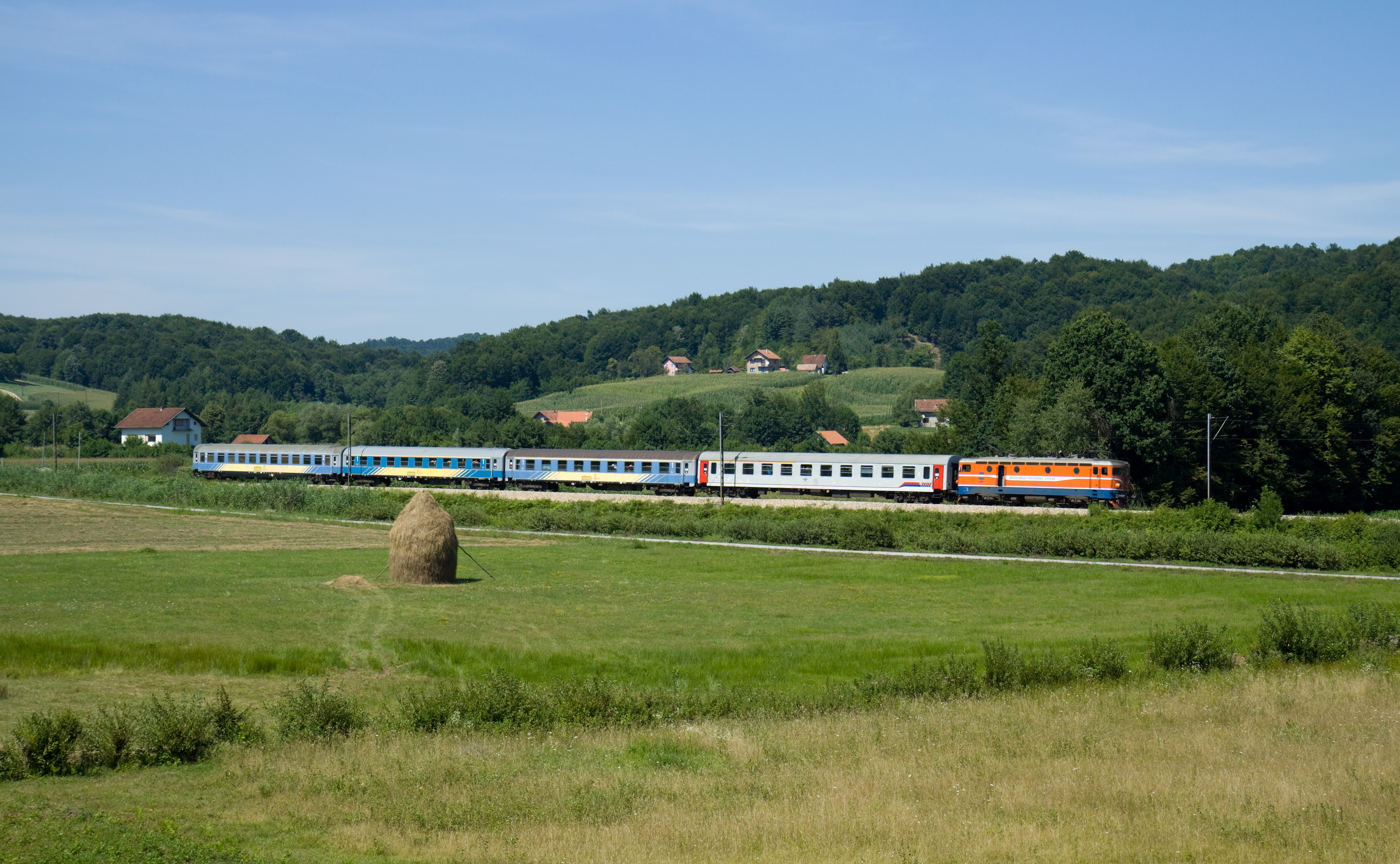
Class 441

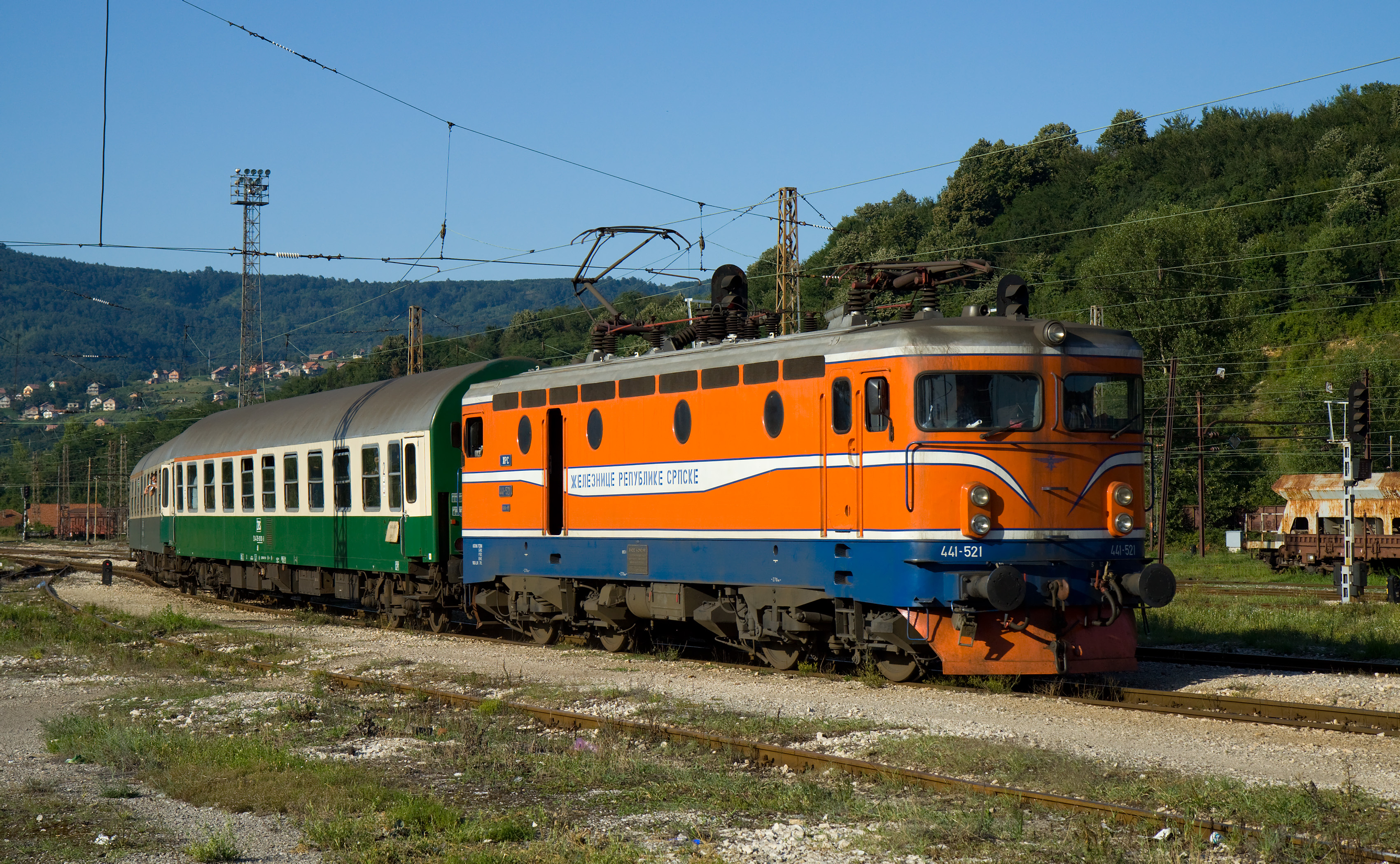
Class 441

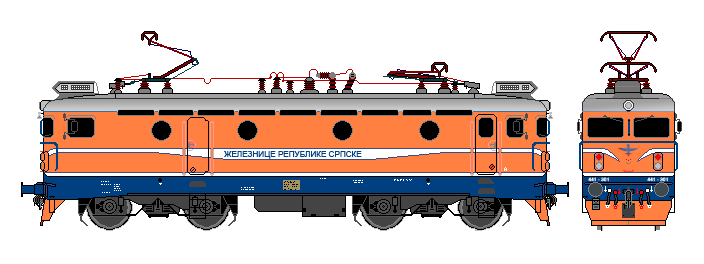
Class 441 drawing

== See also ==
- Railways of the Federation of Bosnia and Herzegovina
- Rail transport in Bosnia and Herzegovina
