= Railways of the Federation of Bosnia and Herzegovina =

Railway company in Bosnia and Herzegovina

- Type: Railway
- Industry: Rail Transport
- Founded: 2001; 25 years ago
- Headquarters: Sarajevo, Bosnia and Herzegovina
- Key people: Nijaz Puzić (Director General)
- Services: Rail Transport, Rail Construction, Services
- Revenue: €60.36 million (2017)
- Net income: (€2.16 million) (2017)
- Total equity: €792.27 million (2017)
- Number of employees: 3,269 (2017)
- Website: Official website

Railways of the Federation of Bosnia and Herzegovina (Serbo-Croatian: Željeznice Federacije Bosne i Hercegovine, Жељезнице Федерације Босне и Херцеговине; abbr. ŽFBH or ЖФБХ) is the railway company of the Federation of Bosnia and Herzegovina. It is one of the two rail companies of Bosnia and Herzegovina (the other is the ŽRS, operating in the Republika Srpska). The company operates 608 km of railroad.

== Overview ==
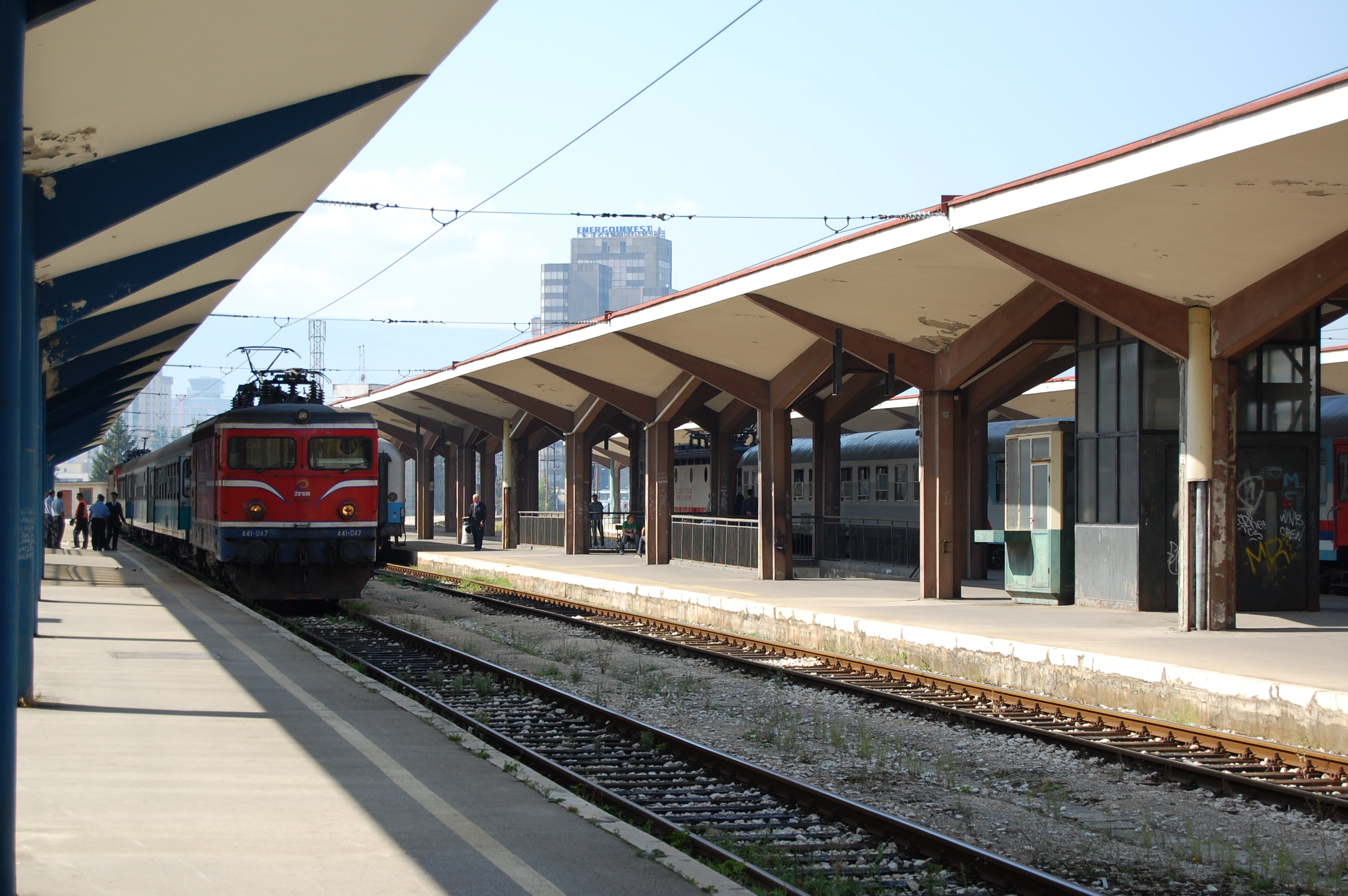
Train station in Sarajevo

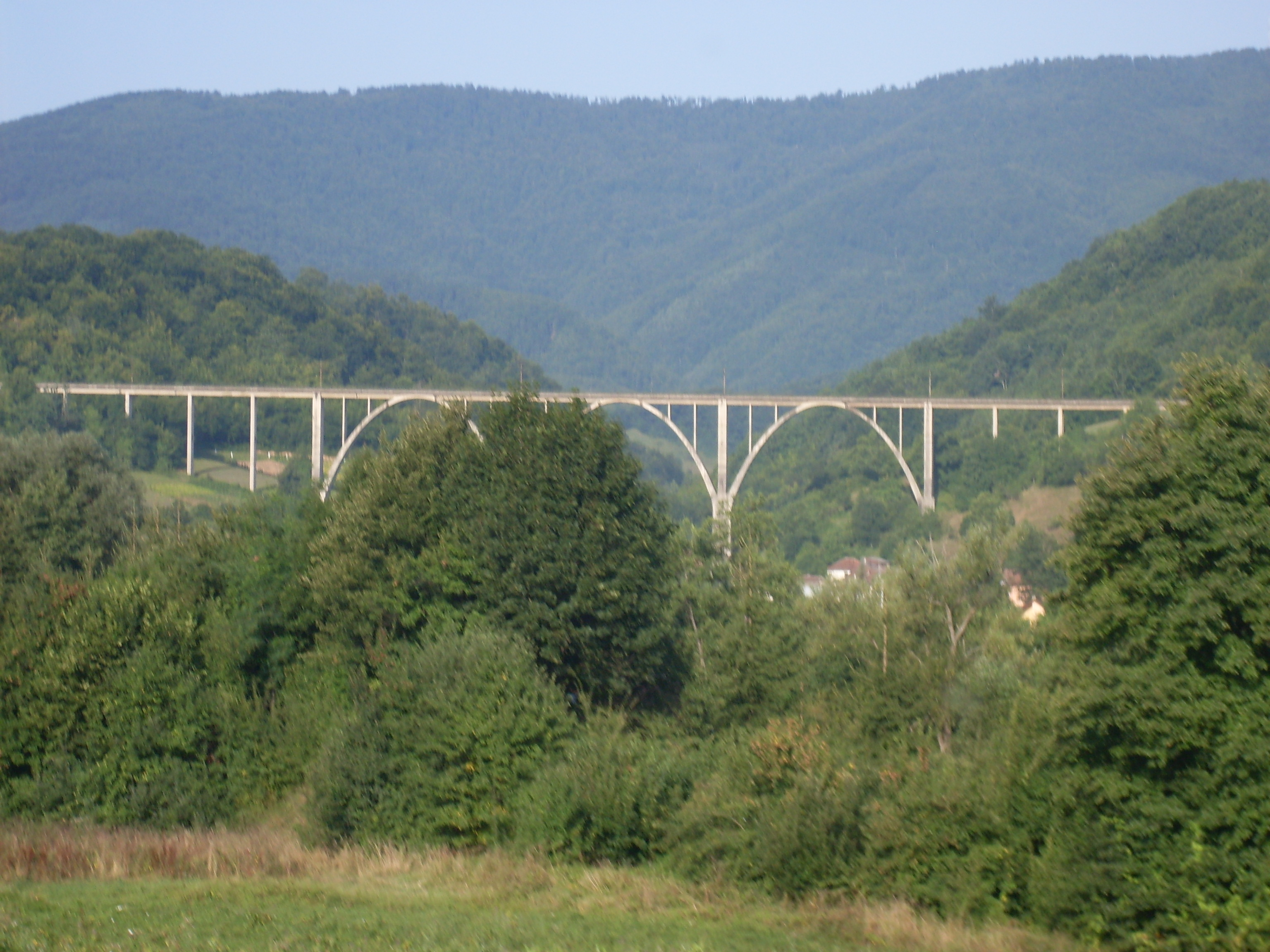
A railway bridge near Tarčin

The company, public and owned by the government of the Federation, was founded in 2001 by the fusion of some public enterprises with the company ŽHB. The network is 601 km long, out of which 392 km is electrified and is built in standard gauge. After extensive rehabilitation, more than 85 percent of the network is now classified as D4 in terms of UIC load categories, allowing maximum loads of 22.5 tons per axle, or 8.0 tons per linear meter.

Basic activity:

Public transport of passengers in domestic and international rail traffic, public transport of cargo via domestic and international rail transport and combined transport; maintenance, reconstruction, modernisation, construction of wagon stock and other equipment necessary for offering of transport services; maintenance, remont, modernisation and development of railway infrastructure; organisation and safety of railway transport.

== Organizational chart ==
- Nijaz Puzić (Director General)
- Enis Džafić (Executive Director for Economy Affairs)
- Muhamed Sahić (Exec. Dir. for Legal Affairs and Human Resources)
- Vlado Budimir (Exec. Dir. for Railway Operations)
- Mirza Šklajić (Exec. Dir. for Infrastructure)
- Mario Kozina (Exec. Dir. for Investments and Development Affairs)

== Rolling stock ==
Model	Type	Picture	Status
JŽ class 441	Electric locomotive		Active
EMD G16	Diesel Locomotive		Active
V 100 (ŽFBH 212)	Diesel Locomotive		Active (Tourist trains)
HŽ series 6111	Electric multiple unit (EMU)		Active (Local and tourist trains)
HZ series 6112	Electric multiple unit (EMU)		Active
Talgo (Talgo VII)	Passenger coaches		Active

== See also ==
- Railways of Republika Srpska
- Rail transport in Bosnia and Herzegovina
- List of companies of Bosnia and Herzegovina
