= Yugoslav Railways =

National railway company of Yugoslavia

- Company type: Government-owned corporation (1918–1941); Labour-managed firm (1945–1992)
- Industry: Railway transport, logistics and shipping
- Predecessor: Austrian Southern Railway; Hungarian State Railways; Imperial Royal Austrian State Railways; Serbian Railways; Chemins de fer Orientaux (CO)
- Founded: 11 November 1918; 107 years ago
- Defunct: 27 April 1992
- Fate: Breakup of Yugoslavia
- Successor: Slovenian Railways (SŽ) in 1991; Croatian Railways (HŽ) in 1991; Macedonian Railways (MŽ) in 1991; Bosnia and Herzegovina Railways; Republika Srpska Railways (ŽRS) in 1992; Railways of the Federation of Bosnia and Herzegovina (ŽFBH) in 2008; Serbian Railways (ŽS) in 2005; Montenegro Railways (ŽCG) in 2005; Kosovo Railways in 2011
- Headquarters: Belgrade, SR Serbia, SFR Yugoslavia
- Area served: FR Yugoslavia
- Products: Rail transport, rail infrastructure, cargo transport, services

Yugoslav Railways, (Note: Croatian: Jugoslavenske željeznice; Serbian: Југословенске железнице / Jugoslovenske železnice; Macedonian: Југословенски железници, romanized: Jugoslovenski železnici; Slovene: Jugoslovanske železnice) with standard acronym JŽ (ЈЖ in Cyrillic), was the state railway company of Yugoslavia, operational from the 1920s to the 1990s, with its final incarnation transferring to Serbia. The successor of JŽ is the joint stock company of the Serbian Railways in 2006.

== History ==
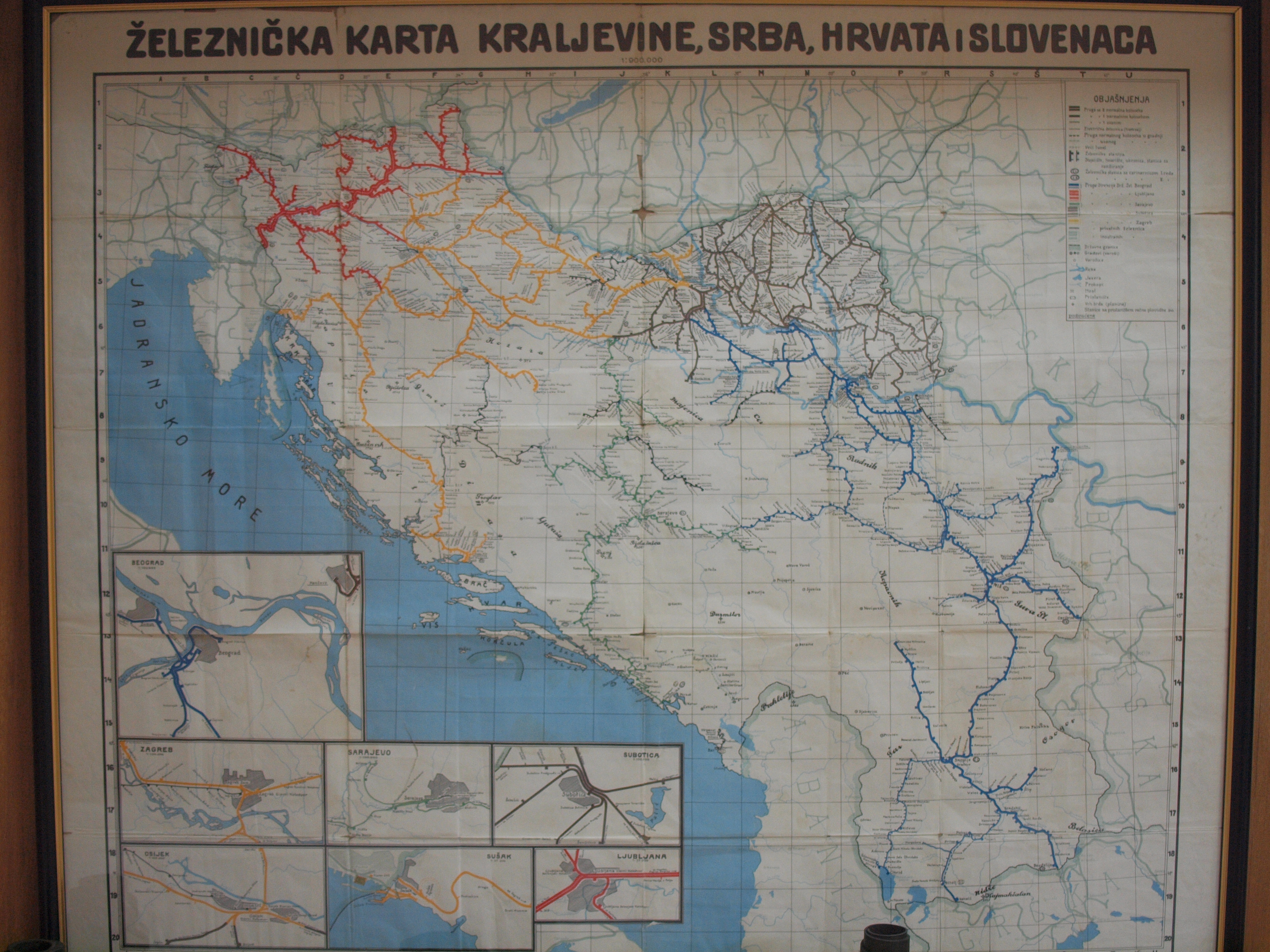
Late-1920s railway map of Yugoslavia

The company was first founded as the National Railways of the Kingdom of the Serbs, Croats and Slovenes (SCS) by incorporating the already existing railway companies and assets in 1918. It became a founding member of the International Union of Railways in 1922, receiving UIC country code 72. In 1929, it was renamed along with the country to Yugoslav State Railways (JDŽ).

As Yugoslavia underwent occupation and partition by Axis powers during 1941, Yugoslav State Railways ceased to exist and its rolling stock was divided between Deutsche Reichsbahn (DRB), Hungarian State Railways (MÁV), Bulgarian State Railways (BDŽ), Ferrovie dello Stato Italiane (FS) and the two new railway companies that were created to serve Independent State of Croatia and Nedić's Serbia: Croatian State Railways (HDŽ) and Serbian State Railways (SDŽ), respectively. By the end of the Second World War, the railways suffered considerable destruction and only with great effort was it re-established after the war. Many locomotives were returned, changed or handed over as reparations to Yugoslavia. With the handover of the eastern territory of Trieste to Yugoslavia, about 100 km of railway network with one-way current (3 kV) became part of JDŽ. In 1952 it was renamed Yugoslav Railways (JŽ).

In the 1950s work began on the construction of the Montenegrin section of Belgrade-Bar railway. The first section from Bar to Podgorica was completed in 1959 (becoming the first section of standard gauge railway in Montenegro). However, due to budget concerns and arguments between state and federal authorities, the line was paid for by Montenegro and Serbia. The Montenegrin section of Belgrade-Bar railway project (from Bar to Vrbnica, the border with Serbia) was completed in 1976, connecting Bar and Podgorica with northern Montenegro, Serbia, and the European rail network.

At the beginning of the conflicts in SFR Yugoslavia, the railway administrations of the separate republics began to disintegrate, that is, to separate from the Union of Yugoslav Railways (ZJZ). ŽG Ljubljana and HŽP Zagreb separated first on 8 October 1991, ZTP Sarajevo on 31 May 1992, and Macedonian Railways became independent on 1 July 1993, leaving only Serbian, Montenegro and Kosovar railways under Belgrade control. During the NATO bombings on FR Yugoslavia, a significant part of the railway and facilities on the Serbian railway network was destroyed or disabled. In 2004 Montenegrin Railways withdrew from the Union of Yugoslav Railways, the railway union officially ceased to exist with the entry into force of the new law on railways of the Republic of Serbia, which was passed in 2005.

== Upgrades ==
During its existence, Yugoslav Railways upgraded a number of older lines and integrated many others.

- Following World War II, the railway line Nikšić-Podgorica was completed in 1948, with 760 mm (2 ft 5 15/16 in) gauge.
- A single-track electrified line connecting Prešnica with Koper was built in 1967.
- In 1965, the Nikšić-Podgorica corridor was upgraded to standard gauge, thus standardizing the entire connection from Bar to Nikšić via Podgorica. The section from Nikšić to Bileća was decommissioned at the time, as well as the Gabela-Zelenika line.
- A large 760 mm narrow-gauge rail network was constructed in the early 20th century, when the Kingdom of Dalmatia as well as Bosnia and Herzegovina were under Austrian control. The rail route to Dubrovnik went from Sarajevo via Mostar and Čapljina rather than to Split and Zagreb in Croatia. In 1967 the line from Sarajevo to Čapljina was upgraded to standard gauge, and from there extended not to Dubrovnik but to terminate at the nearby Port of Ploče, handling freight via Bosnia. The route from Čapljina to Dubrovnik was closed in 1975 by the Yugoslav Government, acting on the advice of foreign transport consultants. This was in spite of the attractive scenery of the route which has been compared to Switzerland's narrow gauge network. Proposals in 1985 to reopen the route were unsuccessful. Direct trains connected Zagreb with Ploče in thirteen hours, via Bosnia and Herzegovina. Today that connection is severed.

== Successor companies ==
- Željeznica Crne Gore (ŽCG) - Montenegro
- Hrvatske željeznice (HŽ) - Croatia
- Željeznice Federacije Bosne i Hercegovine (ŽFBiH) - Federation of Bosnia and Herzegovina, Bosnia and Herzegovina
- Željeznice Republike Srpske (ŽRS) - Republika Srpska, Bosnia and Herzegovina
- Makedonski Železnici (MŽ) - Macedonia / since 2019 North Macedonia
- Slovenske železnice (SŽ) - Slovenia
- Železnice Srbije (ŽS) - Serbia
- Hekurudhat e Kosovës - Kosovo

== Yugoslav Railwaymen's Day ==
Yugoslav Railwaymen's Day on 15 April was established in 1950 to remember the work and sacrifice of railwaymen and women across Yugoslavia. It was founded on the 30th anniversary of the general strike of 1920, which began on the night of 15/16 April and lasted for the rest of that month. During that time, all railway traffic across Yugoslavia was suspended, as an approximate of 50,000 railway workers from all railway stations, furnaces and workshops rose up against violent suppression of workers' rights in light of difficult socio-economic circumstances facing the country. The Minister of Transport of the Kingdom of Serbs, Croats and Slovenes, Anton Korošec, employed violent suppression of strikers and supporter rallies through military, gendarmerie, police and any other means necessary to make them return to work. A peaceful demonstration of about 4,000 people on 24 April on Zaloška cesta in Ljubljana, which included women and children, ended with 14 killed and up to 75 severely wounded. Working people on the Yugoslav railways celebrated this day solemnly and laboriously, recalling the many events of the growth and maturation of the workers' movement and everything that led to the historic general strike. It was celebrated annually from its inception in 1950 until breakup of Yugoslavia in 1991.

== Rolling stock ==
In its beginnings, the JŽ used mostly Austrian and Hungarian-made steam locomotives. Electric and diesel locomotives were introduced in number from the 1960s onwards; electric locomotives were acquired from Ansaldo (Italy); Alsthom, ASEA also supplied some classes, and locomotives were also license-built in Croatia and at Electroputere in Romania; in the 1980s the indigenous AC electric JŽ series 442 was developed by Rade Končar.

Most of the mainline diesel locomotives were from GM-EMD with a substantial number of Brissonneau et Lotz designs (some licenses built by Đuro Đaković). Shunters were acquired from MAVAG, Jenbacher werke, and also license-built by Đuro Đaković. The railway also operated locomotives from the Lyudinov works, Soviet Union, ex-DB V60 shunters (Germany) and high power Krauss-Maffei ML 2200 C'C' type.

Railcars, EMUs, and DMUs were sourced from Spain, Italy, Hungary, Germany and the Soviet Union from a variety of manufacturers.

=== Classification system ===
A new numbering system was tried for the new standard locomotives built from 1930. All locomotives were renumbered by 1935, which was valid for steam engines.

The locomotives on the 760 mm (2 ft 5 15/16 in) Bosnian gauge were classified 70-98 and for the 600 mm (1 ft 11 5/8 in) gauge 99.2, 99.3 and 99.4.

A three-plus-three digit class designation system was used from the late 1950s - the first digit indicated the power type of vehicle: 0, 1 and 2 were reserved for steam traction, 3 indicated 3 kV DC traction; 4 25 kV AC traction; 5 multisystem traction (not used until the Slovenian Railways, which inherited the Yugoslav naming scheme, introduced class 541 electric locomotives), 6 diesel electric; 7 diesel hydraulic; 8 diesel mechanical transmission and 9 an infrastructure or works vehicle. The second digit indicated the vehicles gauge and axle arrangement: 0, a narrow gauge railcar; 1, a standard gauge railcar; numbers 2 to 8 indicated a locomotive with that number of driving axles. The third digit indicated different classes within the type description. The fourth digit indicated class subtypes, and the last two digits the vehicle number (starting at 01).

=== Carriages ===
Both carriages from the former Yugoslav Railways, as well as second-hand carriages from all over Europe, are available, however many of them not in operating condition. At the moment, all locomotive-hauled passenger trains use former SJ coaches and, in the case of the InterCity, one carriage of Makedonski Železnici.

Description	Image	Type	Number	Built	Builder	Notes
ÖBB-Spantenwagen						Former ÖBB Spantenwagen Acquired around 1984. At least one seen 50 72 24-20 650-2
						Built in Yugoslavia. One seen with UIC 50 72 24-25 508-7

== Gallery ==
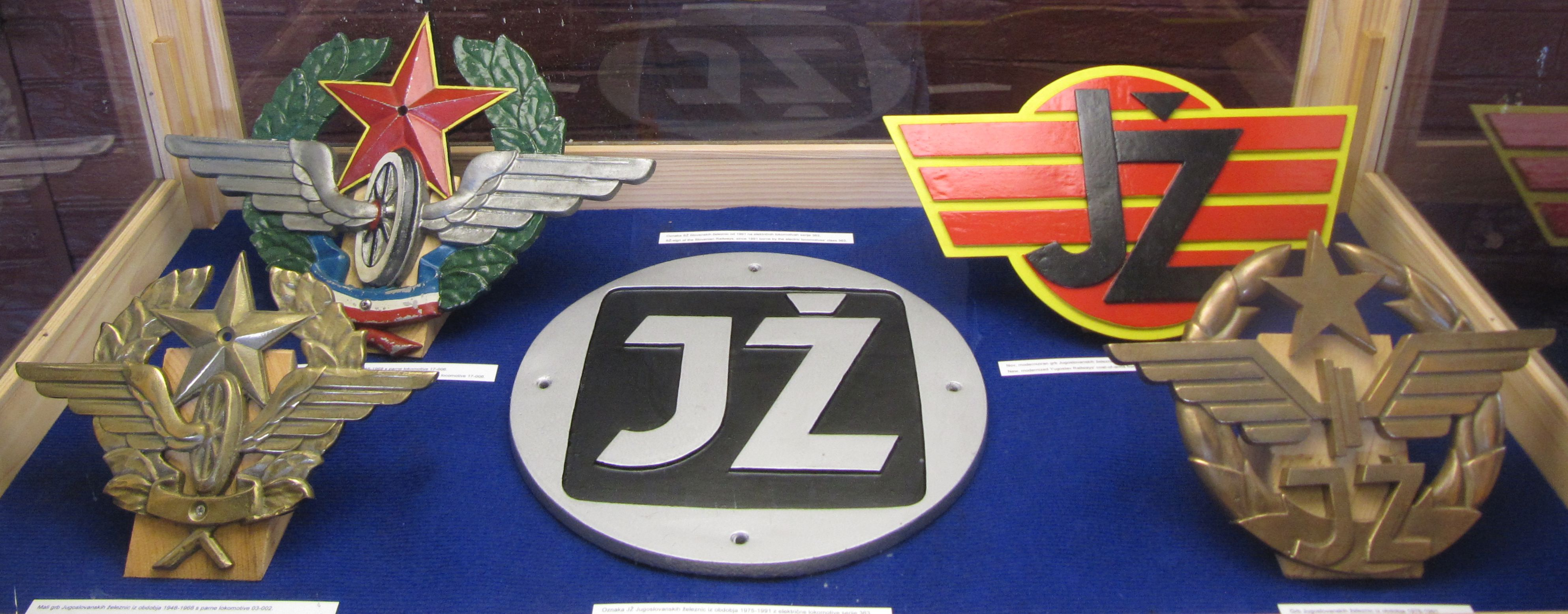
Former logos of Yugoslav railways

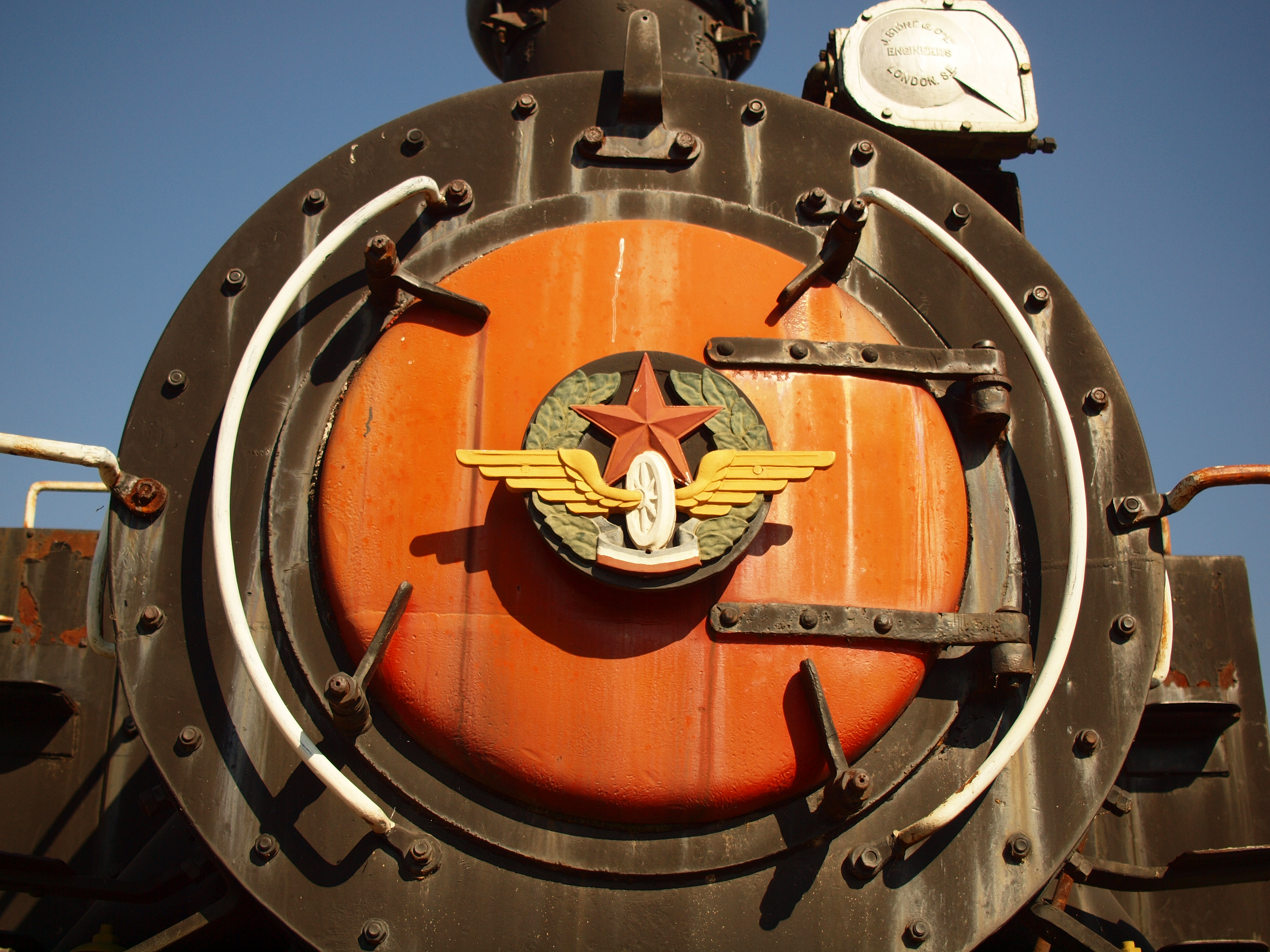
Former logo of Yugoslav railways

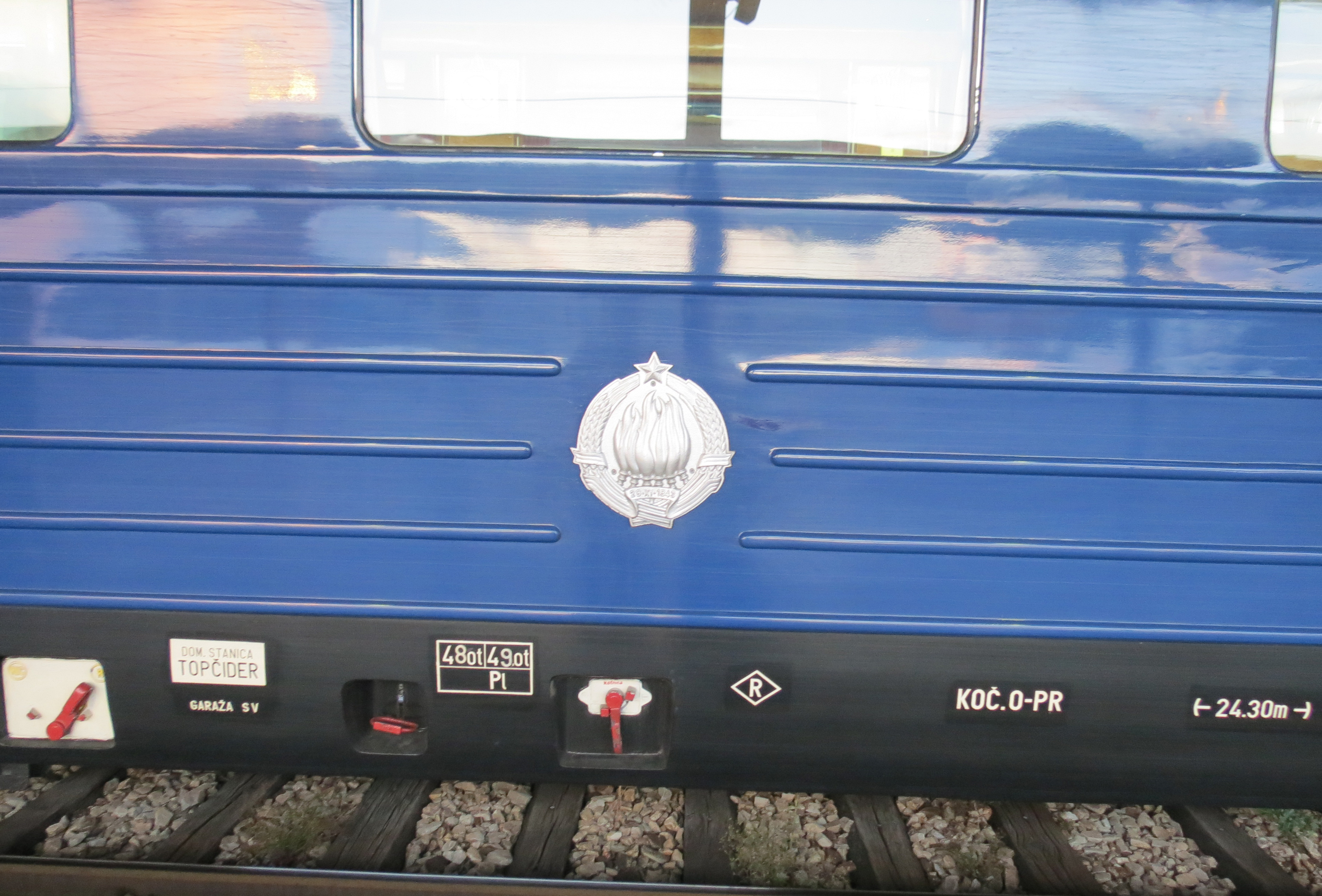
Former Blue train of Tito

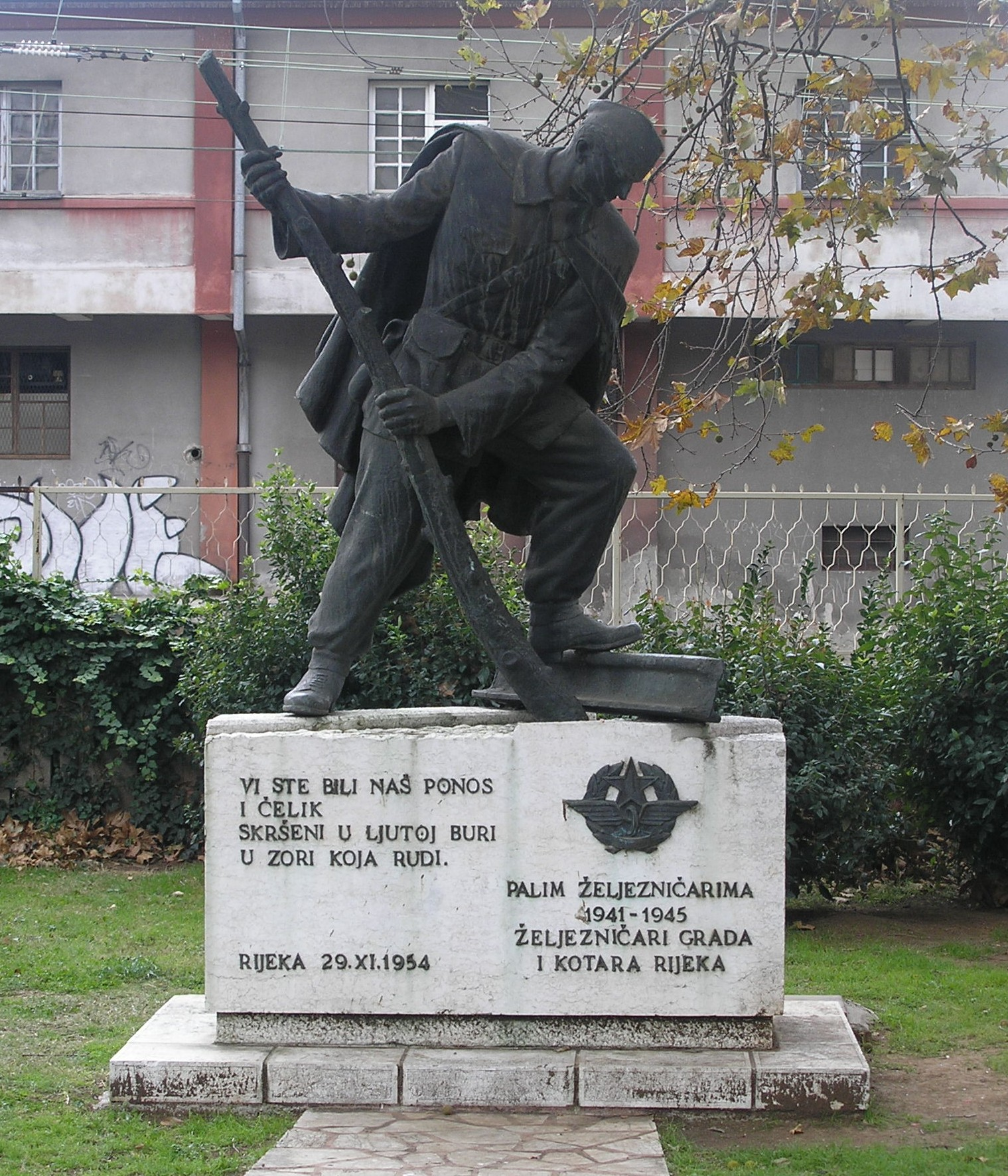
Monument dedicated to anti-fascist railway workers of Rijeka, Croatia during WWII
