= Pogonik =

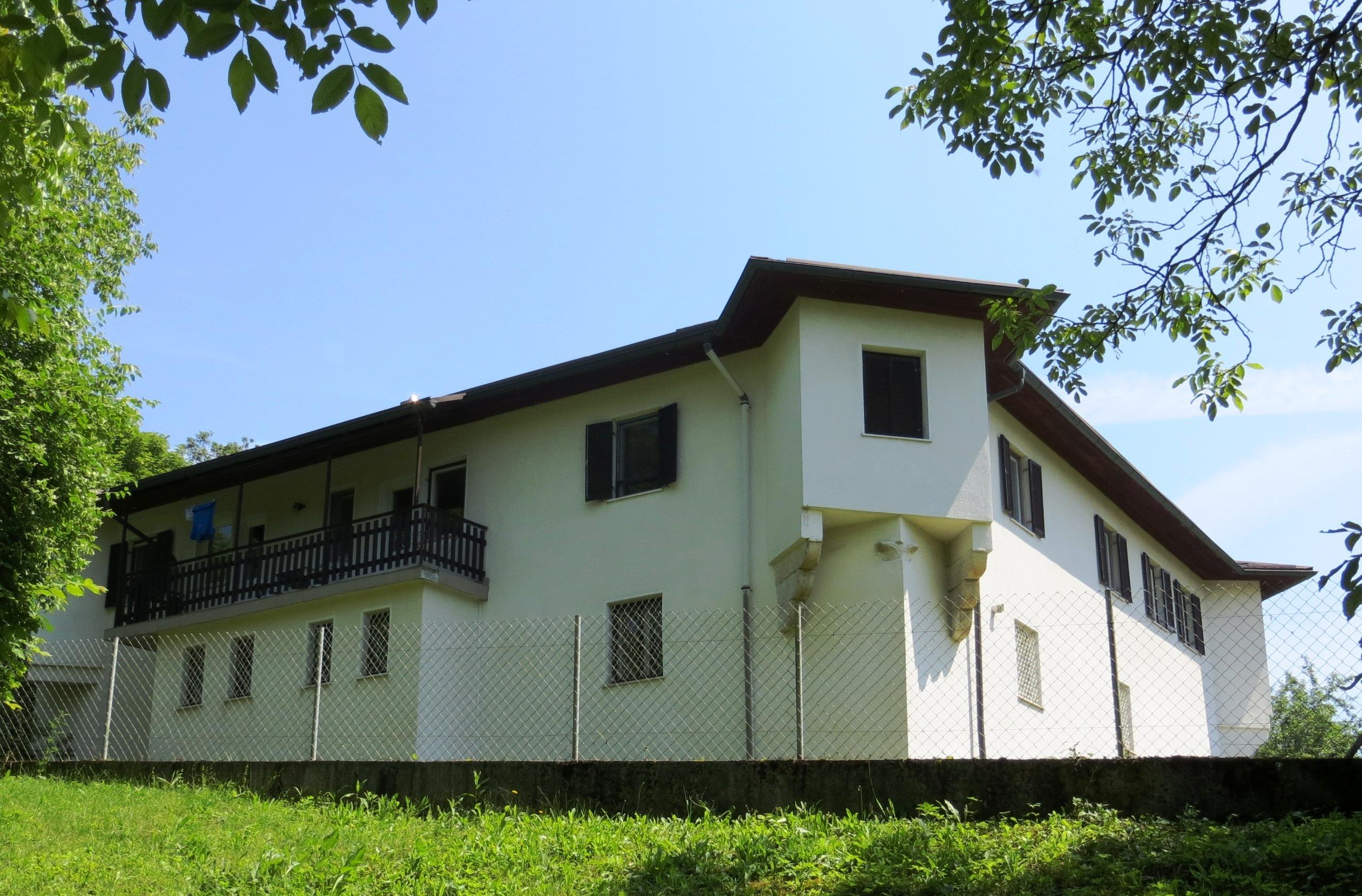

- Location in Slovenia
- Coordinates: 46°5′4.32″N 14°49′29.24″E
- Country: Slovenia
- Traditional region: Lower Carniola
- Statistical region: Central Sava
- Municipality: Litija

Area
  - Total: 1.2 km^{2} (0.46 sq mi)
- Elevation: 268.6 m (881 ft)

Population (2002)
  - Total: 16
- Postal code: 1270

Pogonik (pronounced [pɔɡɔˈniːk]; sometimes Poganek, German: Poganegg) is a settlement on the right bank of the Sava River north of Litija in central Slovenia. The railway line from Ljubljana to Zidani Most runs through the settlement. The area is part of the traditional region of Lower Carniola. It is now included with the rest of the municipality in the Central Sava Statistical Region.

== History ==
Pogonik Castle was built in the early 16th century, probably after the destructive earthquake in 1511. Johann Weikhard von Valvasor wrote that the castle was built from the ruins of the castle at Vernek. A wooden railroad bridge was built across the Sava River at Pogonik in 1848, and the Poganek railroad tunnel was built in 1849. It is 123 m (404 ft) long. The wooden bridge was replaced by an iron bridge in 1898. During the Second World War, the Partisans burned Pogonik Castle in 1944 and damaged the railroad bridge.

Pogonik was a hamlet of Podšentjur until 1995, when it became a separate settlement.

== Gallery ==
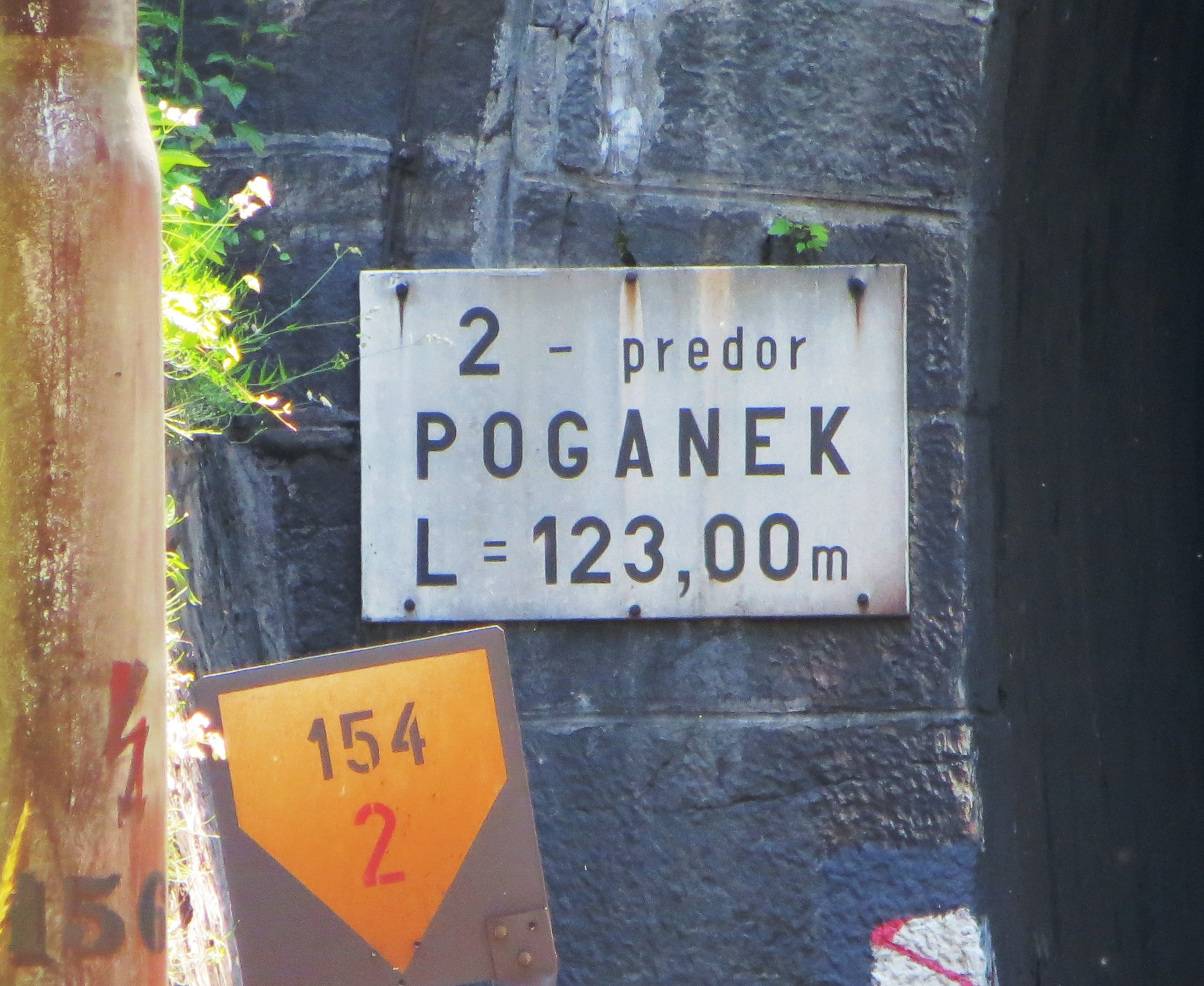
Poganek tunnel sign

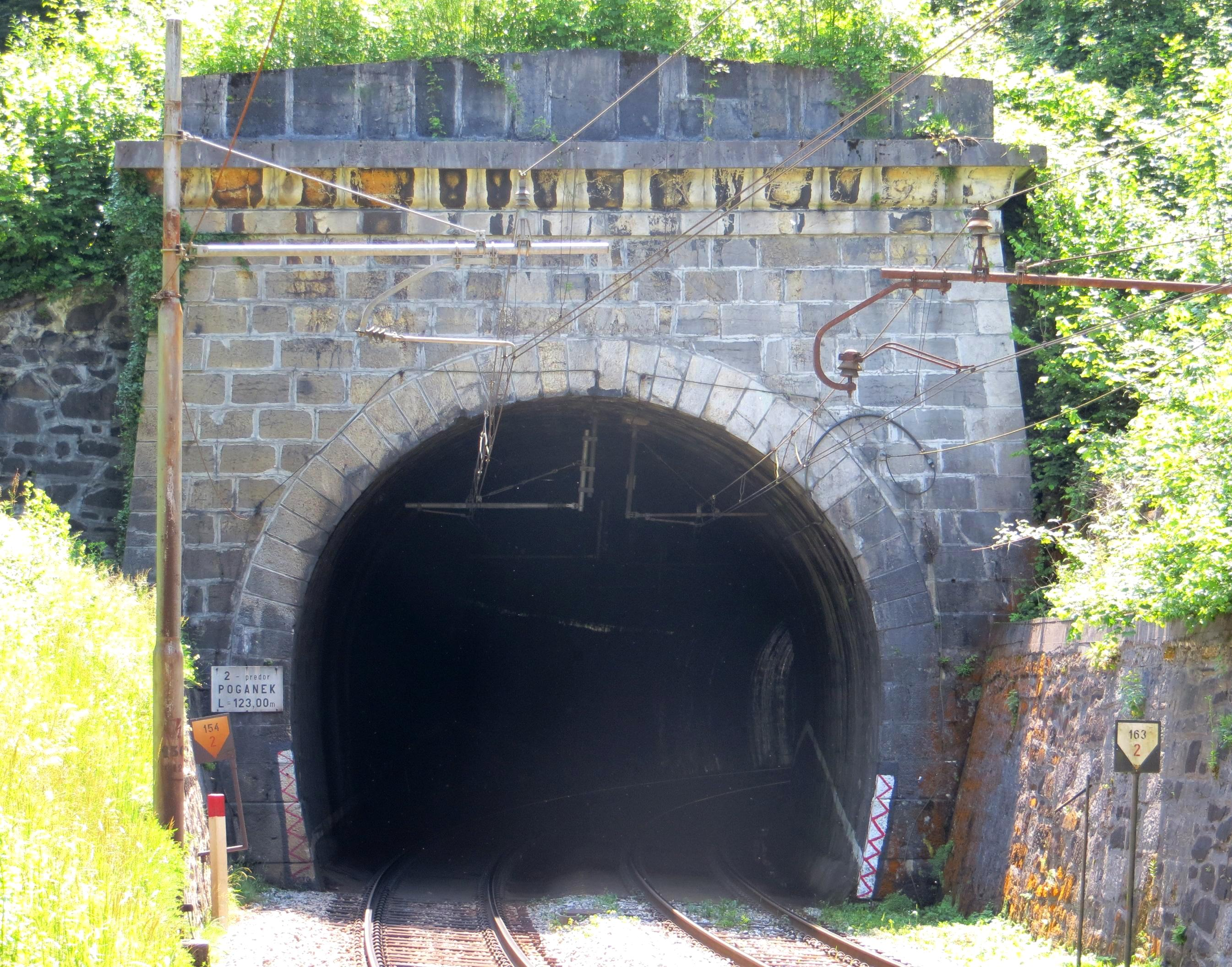
Poganek railroad tunnel
