= Veles railway station =

Railway station in Veles, North Macedonia

Veles railway station Железничка станица Велес
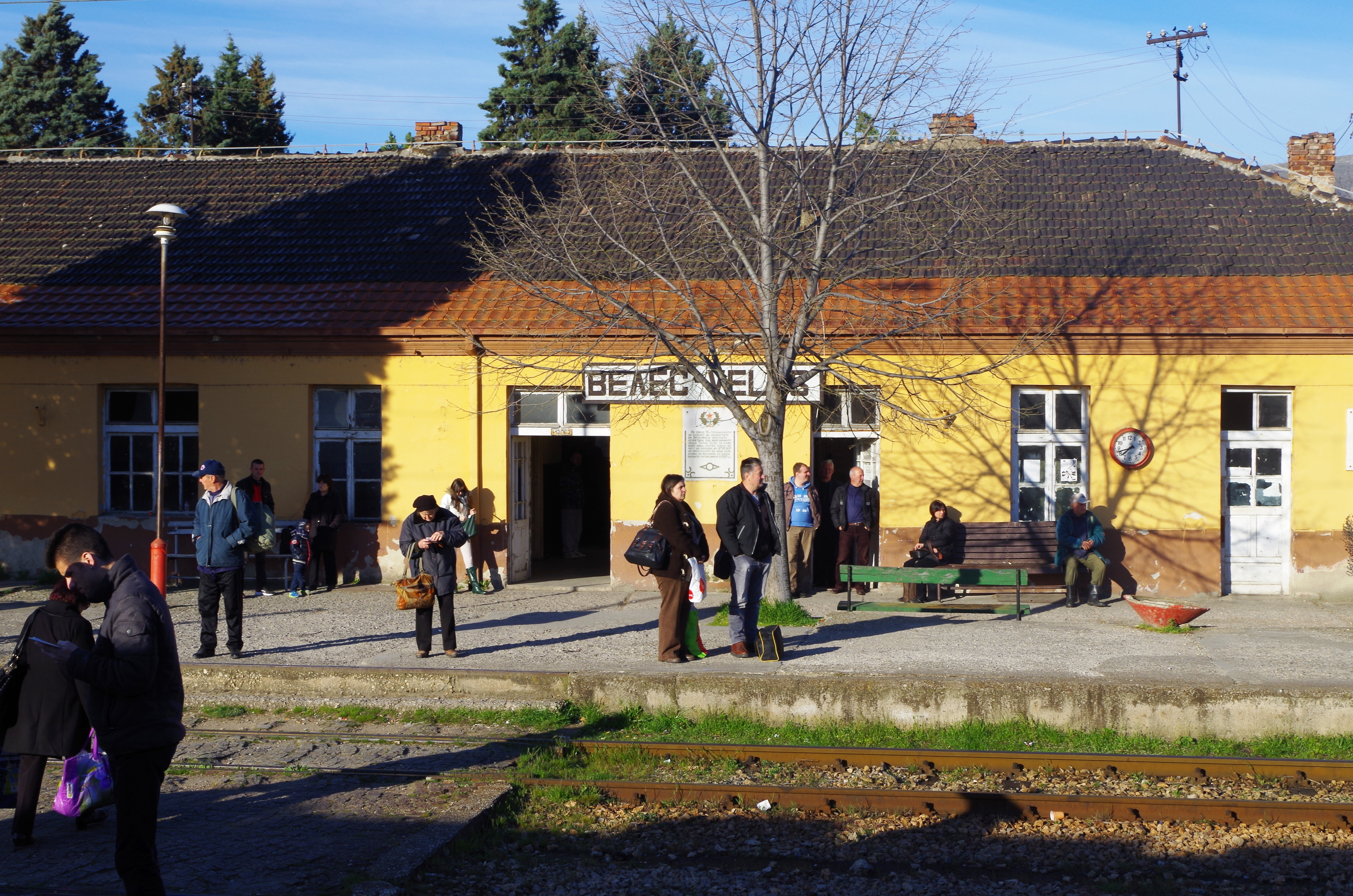
- Veles railway station, April 2015

General information
- Location: Zeleznicka Stanica Veles; Veles; North Macedonia
- Coordinates: 41.724019°N 21.769295°E
- Owner: Makedonski Železnici
- Operator: Makedonski Železnici
- Lines: Corridor 10; Skopje - Veles; Veles - Gevgelija; Veles - Kičevo; Veles - Kremenica; Veles - Kočani; Skopje - Thessaloniki
- Platforms: 2
- Tracks: 10

Construction
- Structure type: at-grade
- Parking: Yes

Other information
- Station code: VS

History
- Opened: 1873
- Rebuilt: 1921; 1950s? 2016
- Electrified: 1978

Passengers
- 2008 1200 (daily); 2011 1000 (daily); 2018 200 (daily)

Services
| Preceding station | Hellenic Train | Following station |
Makedonski Železnici
| Kumanovo towards Belgrade | Hellas | Zgropolsi towards Thessaloniki |
| Terminus | Hellas | Zgropolsi towards Thessaloniki |
| Terminus | Hellas | Raiko Zinzifov towards Thessaloniki |
| Zgropolsi towards Belgrade | Hellas | Raiko Zinzifov towards Thessaloniki |
Location
- Location within North Macedonia

Veles railway station (VS) (Железничка станица Велес) is the main railway station in Veles, North Macedonia. Today, the recently renovated station serves the passengers who travel from Veles mostly to Skopje, and less to Bitola, Gevgelija or Kocani and the road stations from these directions. The station is 50.9 km away from the main railway station in Skopje.

== History ==
The station was built in 1873 when Chemins de fer Orientaux opened the line from Skopje to Thessaloniki, both at the time part of Ottoman Empire. The station opened 9 April 1873, to great fanfare as the first station to be open in present-day North Macedonia, making it the oldest in Macedonia, and the first train arrived right here from Thessaloniki. Services were then extended to Skopje, on 9 August 1873. Following the Treaty of London that ended the First Balkan War on 30 May 1913, Gevgelija was annexed then incorporated into the Kingdom of Serbia, and Veles was integrated into the Serbian railways. The station as a central railway junction was a constant target of destruction throughout all the wars in the region. It was demolished in the First World War then rebuilt and put into use in 1921 On 25 August 1926, the Veles-Kochani line was launched. In 1929 the railways along with the country were renamed, now known as Yugoslav State Railways (JDŽ). On 19 September 1932, the construction of the Prilep-Veles railway through Bogomila began, which was completed on 20 January 1936. With that, Veles was connected with Bitola, because the railway was previously only in the direction of Thessaloniki. In April 1941 the railway ceased to exist when Yougoslvia was annexed by the Axis powers. Despite having joined the Axis Powers, the Bulgarian military did not participate in the invasion of Yugoslavia, however, were ready to occupy their pre-arranged territorial gains immediately after the capitulation of the country. The Yugoslav government surrendered on 17 April; on 19 April, the Bulgarian Land Forces entered Yugoslavia. After Yugoslavia's capitulation, Bulgaria occupied most of Yugoslav Macedonia, which had been lost to Bulgaria in 1918. The railways in these regions were incorporated into the Bulgarian State Railways and repurposed to serve the war effect. It was during this time that the station was again destroyed and only rebuilt at the end of the war. Following Bulgaria's surrender, Veles was returned to Yugoslavia. The railway was reestablished after World War II. According to Petar Spasovski, assistant director for Legal Affairs at MZ Infrastructure, after the Second World War, a small building was built, which could not meet the needs of passengers, so a larger structure was built by Yugoslav Railways in its current form in the 1950s. In 1978 the line was electrified In September 1991, an independence referendum was held in then Socialist Republic of Macedonia, which afterwards proclaimed independence from SFR Yugoslavia to become Republic of Macedonia. With that, Veles and all rail infrastructure and assets were transferred from Yugoslav Railways to Makedonski Železnici MŽ. In 2017 the station (along with Dozens of other reconstructed railway stations on Corridor 10) remained closed while a dispute between Macedonian Railways-Infrastructure and Ministry of Transport and Communications over the technical acceptance of the building work dragged on. Veles railway station, like others on this stretch of line, has had the work concluded for over a year, however, the station work had not been signed off, and as a result, the station remained closed. The same fate befell the railway stations in Caska, Gradsko and Bogomila, Demir Kapija, Negotino, Gevgelija, Prilep, Bitola, which have been renovated but have not been officially handed over for use. The old steam locomotive is still sitting in a siding at the station.

== Facilities ==
The station has a ticket office, toilets and cafe. At platform level, the station is equipped with departure and arrival screens on the platforms for passenger information, seating, and information boards. Currently, no buses call at the station. There is however onsite parking available at the station. The station can be contacted during opening hours by phone075 281- 972. The station has ten tracks and some of them are electrified. There are two old water tanks at the station, both of which functioned until 1978 when steam engines were withdrawn from service.

== Services ==
The main north–south line from Niš in Serbia to the port of Thessaloniki in Greece on the Aegean Sea (Corridor X), passes Skopje. Intercity trains link Skopje with, Kumanovo, Zelenikovo, Veles, Negotino (Kavadarci), Demir Kapija, Miravci (Valandovo) and Gevgelija (Bogdanci) with Serbian Railways and Greek railways. Connections to Bulgarian State Railways are via Niš in Serbia and via Thessaloniki in Greece.

== The Three statues ==
In 1907 Ottoman Sultan Abdul Hamid II was returning by train from Present-day Kosovo, his train was due to pass through Veles, to take on water and passengers. At the station, was a shop owned by Alexander Levkov, who also had a factory for decorative ceramics. On seeing the Sultan, Alexander gave him a small figurine as a parting gift. According to Viktor Levkov, the grandson of Alexander, the Sultan was so thrilled to receive this gift that he later sent lira from Istanbul as a reward. To this Alexander sent two new figures for the sultan. Museum workers from Skopje claim that those three figures are in the museum in the Topkapı Palace, with the dedication that they are from Levkovi from Nupruli, the old Turkish name for Veles, from the Turkish Sultan.

== Gallery ==
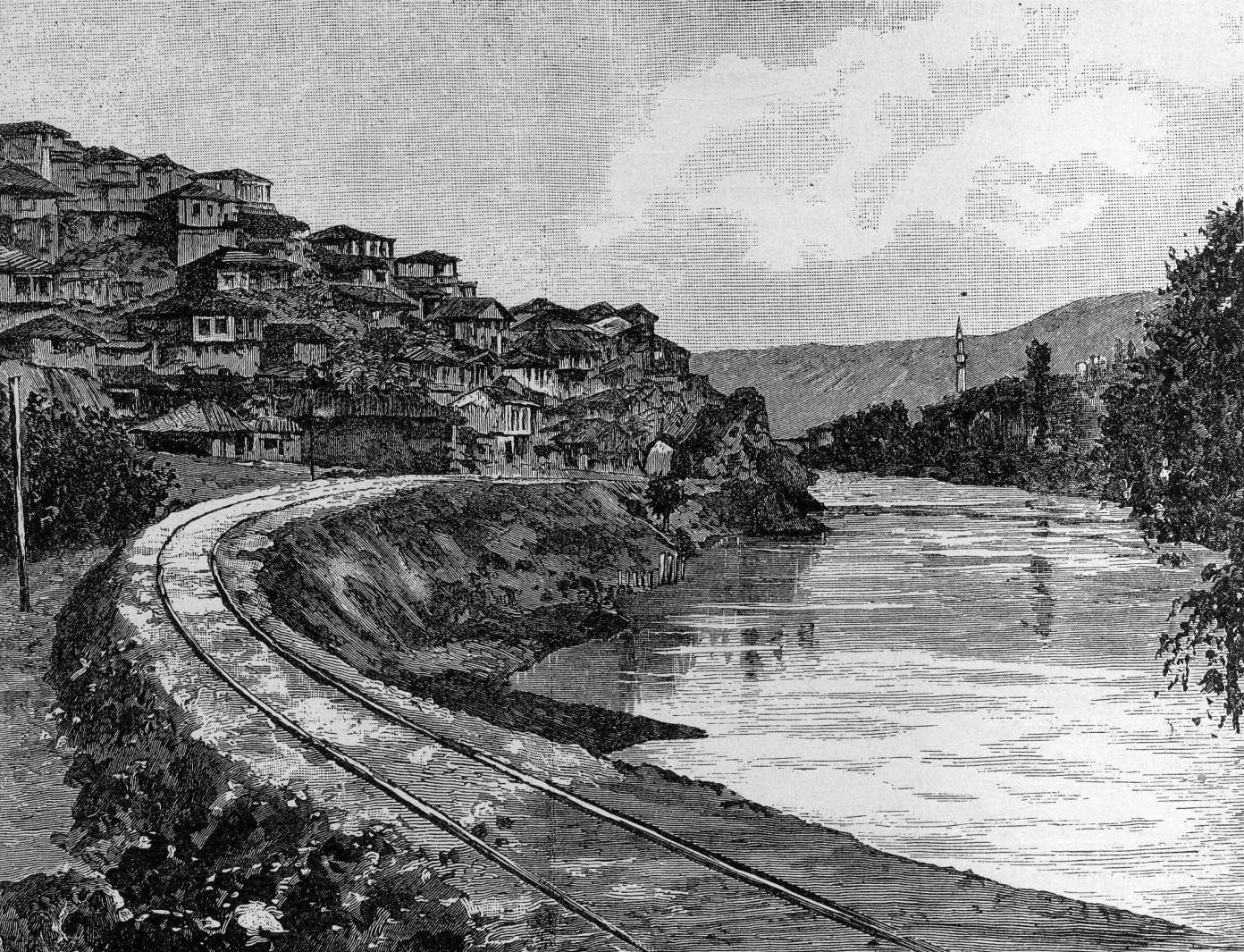
Velesa in the late 19th century, R. J. Odavić, editor (1899) Nova Iskra.

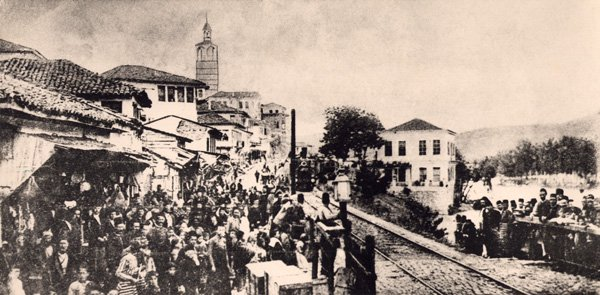
Formal reception on the occasion of the arrival of the first train in Veles in 1873.
