= Pan-European Corridor X =

Road in Europe

- Pan-European Corridor X highlighted in red

Major junctions
- Start end: Salzburg (Austria)
- End end: Thessaloniki (Greece)

Location
- Countries: Austria; Bulgaria; Croatia; Greece; Hungary; North Macedonia; Serbia; Slovenia

Highway system
- Pan-European corridors

The Corridor X is one of the pan-European corridors. It runs between Salzburg in Austria and Thessaloniki in Greece. The corridor passes through Austria, Slovenia, Croatia, Serbia, North Macedonia, and Greece. It has four branches: Xa, Xb, Xc, and Xd.

The European Bank for Reconstruction and Development has given loans to support infrastructure improvements along Corridor X.

== Branches ==
X: Salzburg - Ljubljana - Zagreb - Belgrade - Niš - Skopje - Veles - Thessaloniki.

- Branch A: Graz - Maribor - Zagreb
- Branch B: Budapest - Novi Sad - Belgrade
- Branch C: Niš - Sofia - Plovdiv - Edirne - Istanbul via Corridor IV
- Branch D: Veles - Prilep - Bitola - Florina - Igoumenitsa (Via Egnatia)

=== Branch A (Corridor Xa) ===
Corridor Xa runs between Graz, Austria and Zagreb, Croatia through Croatia, Slovenia, and Austria.

=== Branch C (Corridor Xc) ===
Corridor Xc follows the route Niš - Sofia - Plovdiv - Edirne - Istanbul.

== The Road corridor ==
2,300 km including branches, with the road in Serbia from Niš to the Bulgarian border nearby Dimitrovgrad recently upgraded to a motorway standard. The construction works in all sections are completed on November 9, 2019.

In Bulgaria, I-8 road connects Sofia with the Serbian border, but Kalotina motorway superseded it after its completion in 2025. Formerly the transit traffic has to pass via the Sofia Ring Road, but a new bypass Northern Speed Tangent under construction from 2015 was inaugurated in 2016. Trakia motorway (A1) runs from Sofia to Chirpan, where Maritsa motorway (A4), completed in October 2015, branches off to Turkey.

In Turkey, Motorway 3 runs from Edirne to Istanbul.

=== The main corridor X ===
Comprises 1,452 km with much of the route following the former Yugoslav Brotherhood and Unity Highway.

=== Austria ===
187 km comprising the A10 Tauern Autobahn (E55) from Salzburg to Villach and the A11 Karawanken Autobahn (E61) to Slovenia by the 1991 Karawanks Tunnel.

=== Slovenia ===
The A2 Illyrian or Upper Carniolan motorway from the Austria border at Jesenice 182 km via Kranj and Ljubljana to Croatia at Obrežje, as the E61 to Ljubljana and the E70 to Zagreb.

=== Croatia ===
The A3 motorway (E70) Autocesta Bregana - Lipovac from the Slovenian border at Bregana 306 km via Zagreb and Novska to Serbia at Lipovac.

=== Serbia ===
495 km made up of the A3 motorway (E70) from the Croatian border at Tovarnik to Beograd and the A1 motorway (E75) south via Niš to North Macedonia at Sopot.

=== North Macedonia ===
The A1 motorway (E75) from Serbia at Tabanovce 207 km via Skopje and Veles to Greece at Bogorodica.

=== Greece ===
From North Macedonia at Idomeni 77 km as A1 Aegean Motorway (E75) to Thessaloniki.

== The Primary Railway corridor ==
2,528 km, all electrified, comprising:

=== Austria ===
217 km double track, electrified using 15 kV 16.7 Hz AC from Salzburg, comprising part of the Salzburg-Tyrol Railway 67 km to Schwarzach-Sankt Veit, the Tauern Railway from Schwarzach-Sankt Veit 79 km to Spittal an der Drau, and the Rosen Valley Railway Route 221 from Villach 63 km dual track to Slovenia at Rosenbach.

=== Slovenia ===
186 km comprising the Tarvisio–Ljubljana Railway from the Austria border at Jesenice 66 km to Ljubljana and the Dobova–Ljubljana Railway 115 km via Zidani Most to Croatia at Dobova, electrified using the Italian 3 kV DC.

=== Croatia ===
434 km, electrified using 25 kV 50 Hz AC. Includes Line M101 from the Slovenian border at Savski Marof 27 km dual track to Zagreb, Line M102 from Zagreb 21 km dual track to Dugo Selo, Line M103 from Dugo Selo 83 km single track to Novska, and Line M104 from Novska 185 km dual track via Vinkovci to Serbia at Tovarnik.

=== Serbia ===
613 km electrified using 25 kV AC, 50 Hz OHLE. Includes Route 1 from the Croatian border at Tovarnik 120 km double track via Sid and Ruma to Belgrade, and Route 2 (E85) from Belgrade 398 km via Niš to North Macedonia at Presevo, double track between Velika Plana and Stalać and from Đunis to Niš, with plans for high-speed rail from Belgrade to Niš.

=== North Macedonia ===
From Serbia at Tabanovce 216 km single track, electrified using 25 kV 50 Hz AC, via Kumanovo to Skopje and the Thessaloniki–Skopje railway via Veles to Greece at Gevgelija.

=== Greece ===
From North Macedonia at Idomeni 77 km single track, electrified using 25 kV AC, to Thessaloniki, for freight only. https://el.wikipedia.org/wiki/%CE%A3%CE%B9%CE%B4%CE%B7%CF%81%CE%BF%CE%B4%CF%81%CE%BF%CE%BC%CE%B9%CE%BA%CE%AD%CF%82_%CE%BC%CE%B5%CF%84%CE%B1%CF%86%CE%BF%CF%81%CE%AD%CF%82_%CF%83%CF%84%CE%B7%CE%BD_%CE%95%CE%BB%CE%BB%CE%AC%CE%B4%CE%B1

== See also ==
- Budapest–Belgrade–Skopje–Athens railway
