= Ljubljana–Zagreb Railway =

There is no officially designated Ljubljana–Zagreb Railway. Information concerning the individual sections of this railway line may be found at:

- Dobova–Ljubljana Railway, the section in Slovenia,
- M101 railway, the section in Croatia.
