= Zidani Most railway station =

Railway station in Slovenia

Zidani Most
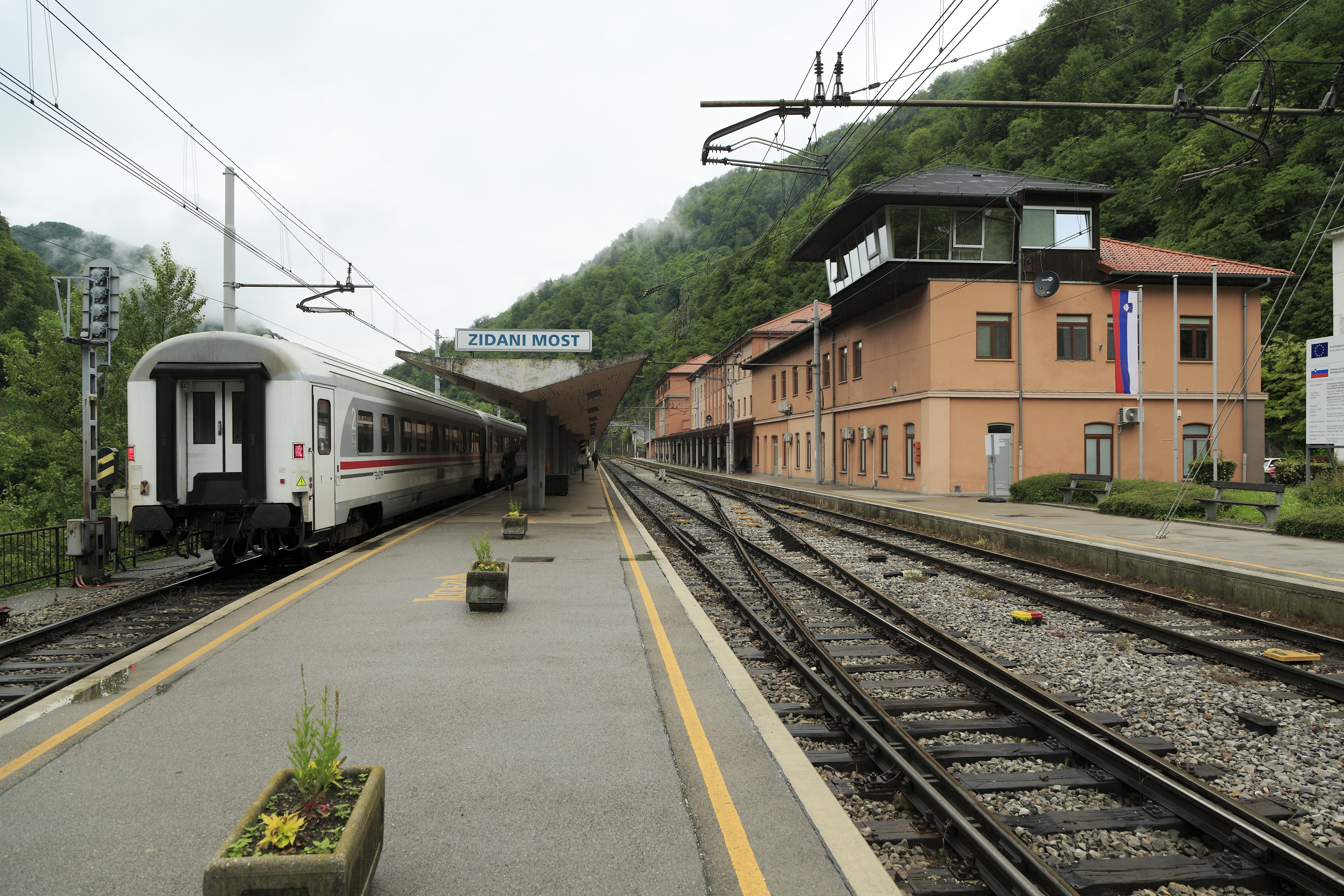
- View of the station

General information
- Location: Za Savo; 1432 Laško; Slovenia
- Coordinates: 46°05′08″N 15°10′13″E
- Owner: Slovenske železnice
- Operator: Slovenske železnice
- Lines: Dobova–Ljubljana; Austrian Southern Railway
- Platforms: 2

Services
Preceding station	Croatian Railways	Following station
Ljubljana towards Zürich HB or Stuttgart Hbf	EuroNight	Sevnica towards Zagreb
Location
- Location within Slovenia

Zidani Most railway station (Slovene: Železniška postaja Zidani Most) is an important railway station and junction in Zidani Most, which is located within the municipality of Laško, Slovenia. The station lies close to the confluence of the Sava and Savinja Rivers. Its importance is because most non-direct train services linking the east with Ljubljana connect here.

== Gallery ==
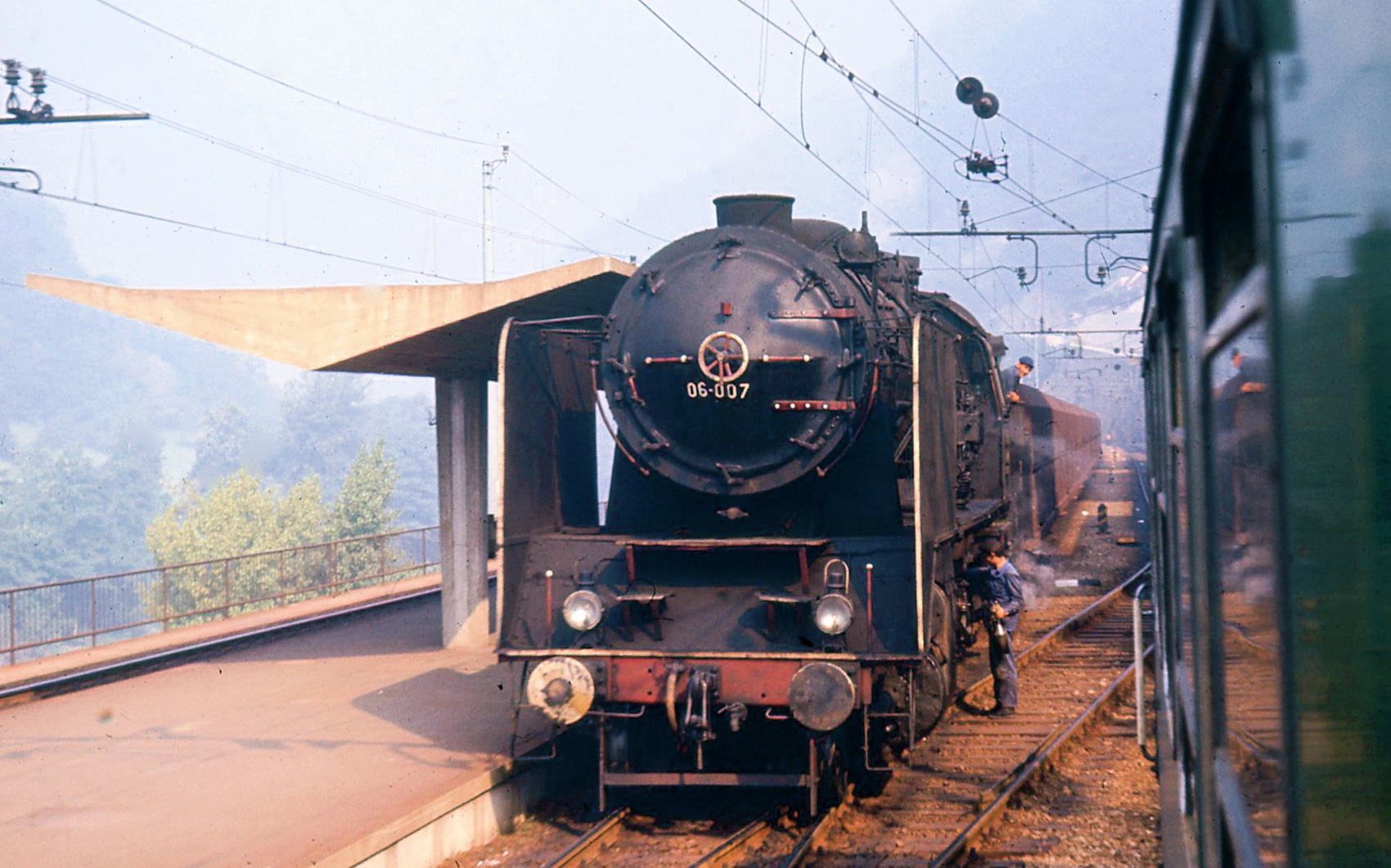
Yugoslav Railways (JŽ) Class 06 2-8-2 at Zidani Most with a train of hopper wagons, August 1971
