= Vernek =

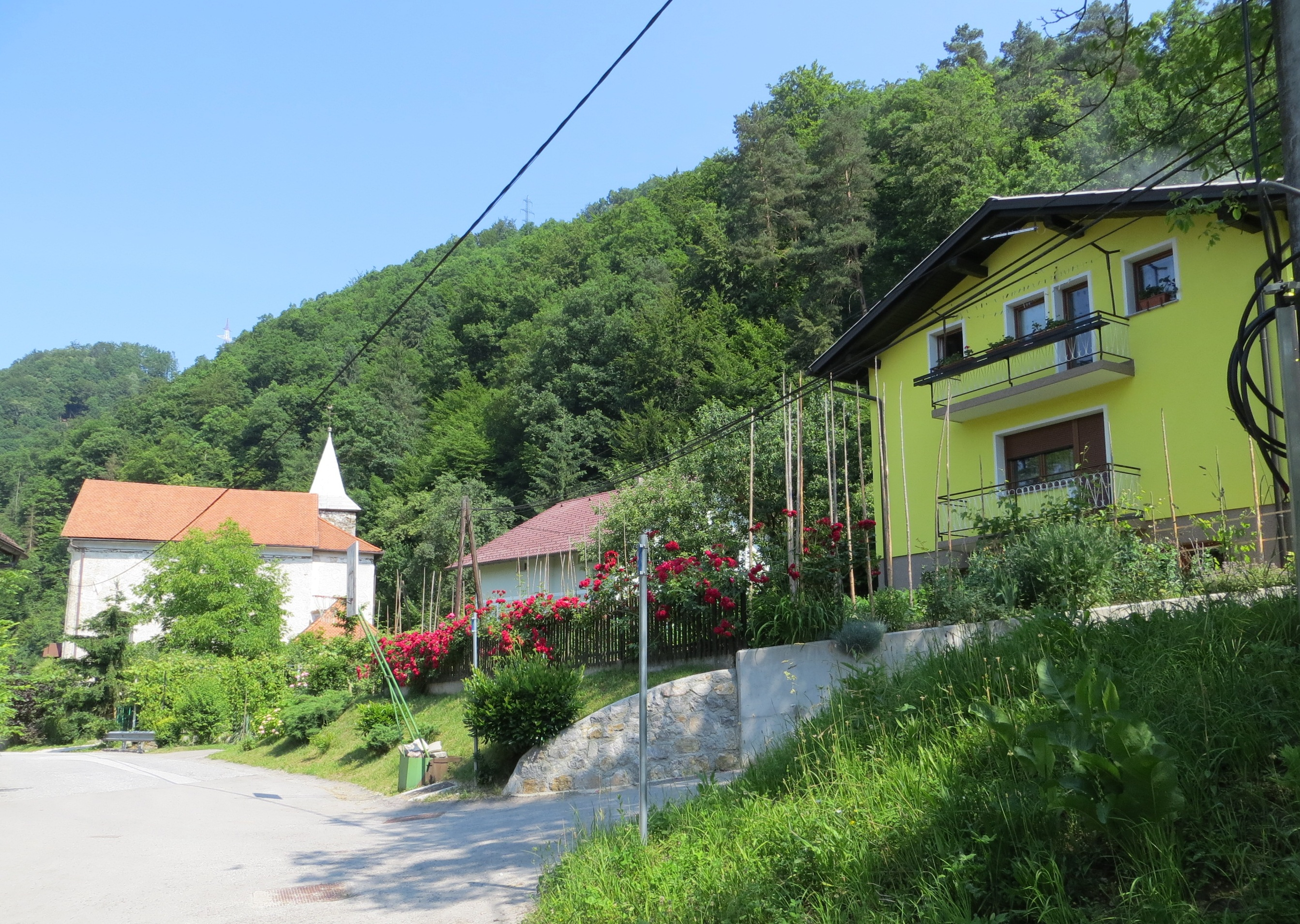

- Location in Slovenia
- Coordinates: 46°6′19.6″N 14°47′33.05″E
- Country: Slovenia
- Traditional region: Upper Carniola
- Statistical region: Central Sava
- Municipality: Litija

Area
  - Total: 1.19 km^{2} (0.46 sq mi)
- Elevation: 252.1 m (827 ft)

Population (2002)
  - Total: 50
- Postal code: 1281

Vernek (pronounced [ʋɛɾˈneːk]) is a settlement on the left bank of the Sava River in the Municipality of Litija in central Slovenia. The area is part of the traditional region of Upper Carniola and is now included with the rest of the municipality in the Central Sava Statistical Region.

== Name ==
Vernek was attested in historical sources as Werdenech in 1250, Guardenchae in 1261, sanndt Johanns in 1435, and Bernekch in 1437, among other spellings.

== History ==
Archaeological evidence shows that the area was settled in the Roman period, most likely as a river port connected to trade up and down the Sava.

== Church ==
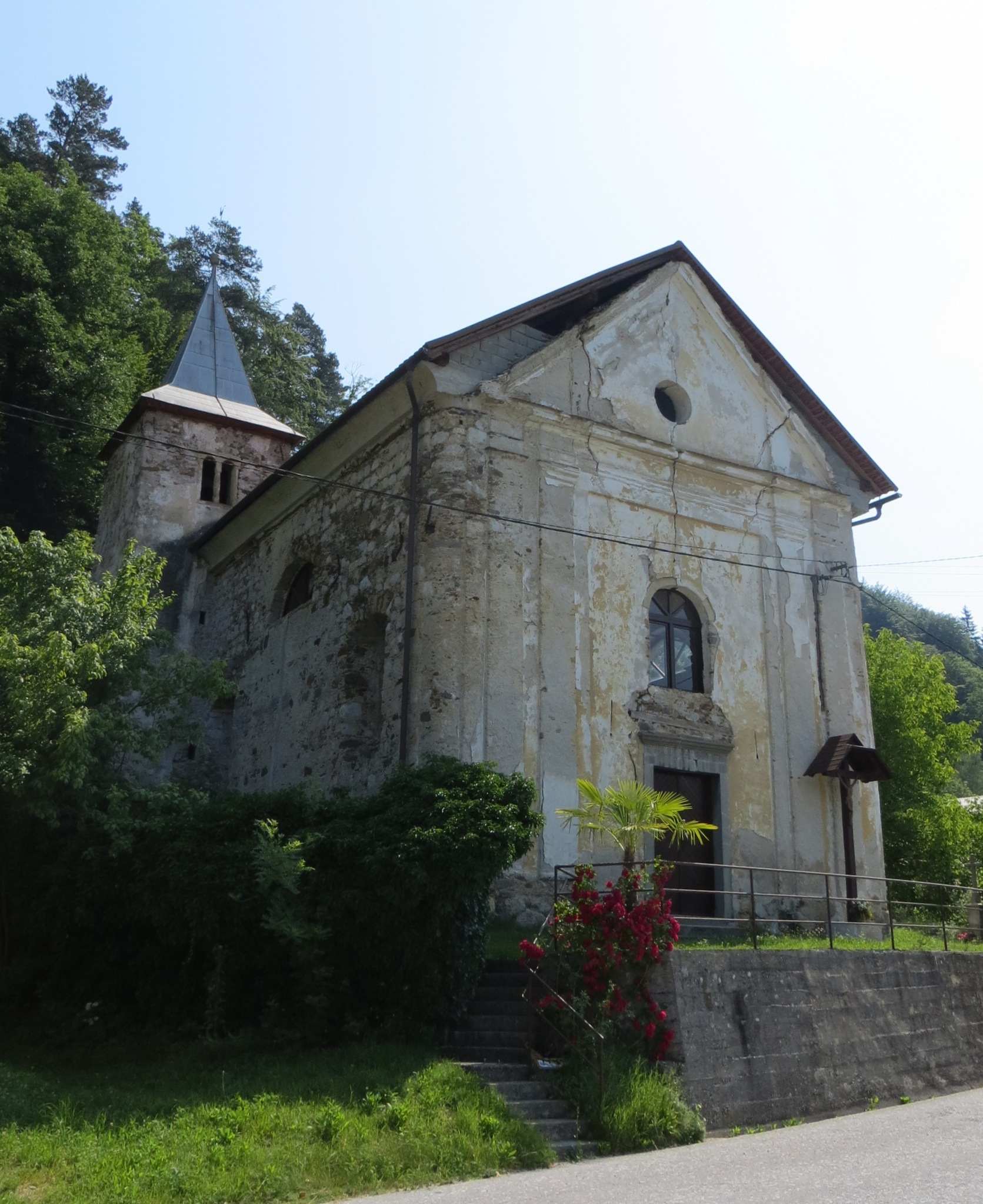
John the Baptist Church

The local church is dedicated to John the Baptist and belongs to the Parish of Hotič in the Roman Catholic Archdiocese of Ljubljana. It was first mentioned in written documents dating to 1250, but the current building dates to the mid-18th century.
