= Idomeni =

Village in Central Macedonia, Greece

Idomeni Ειδομένη
- Community
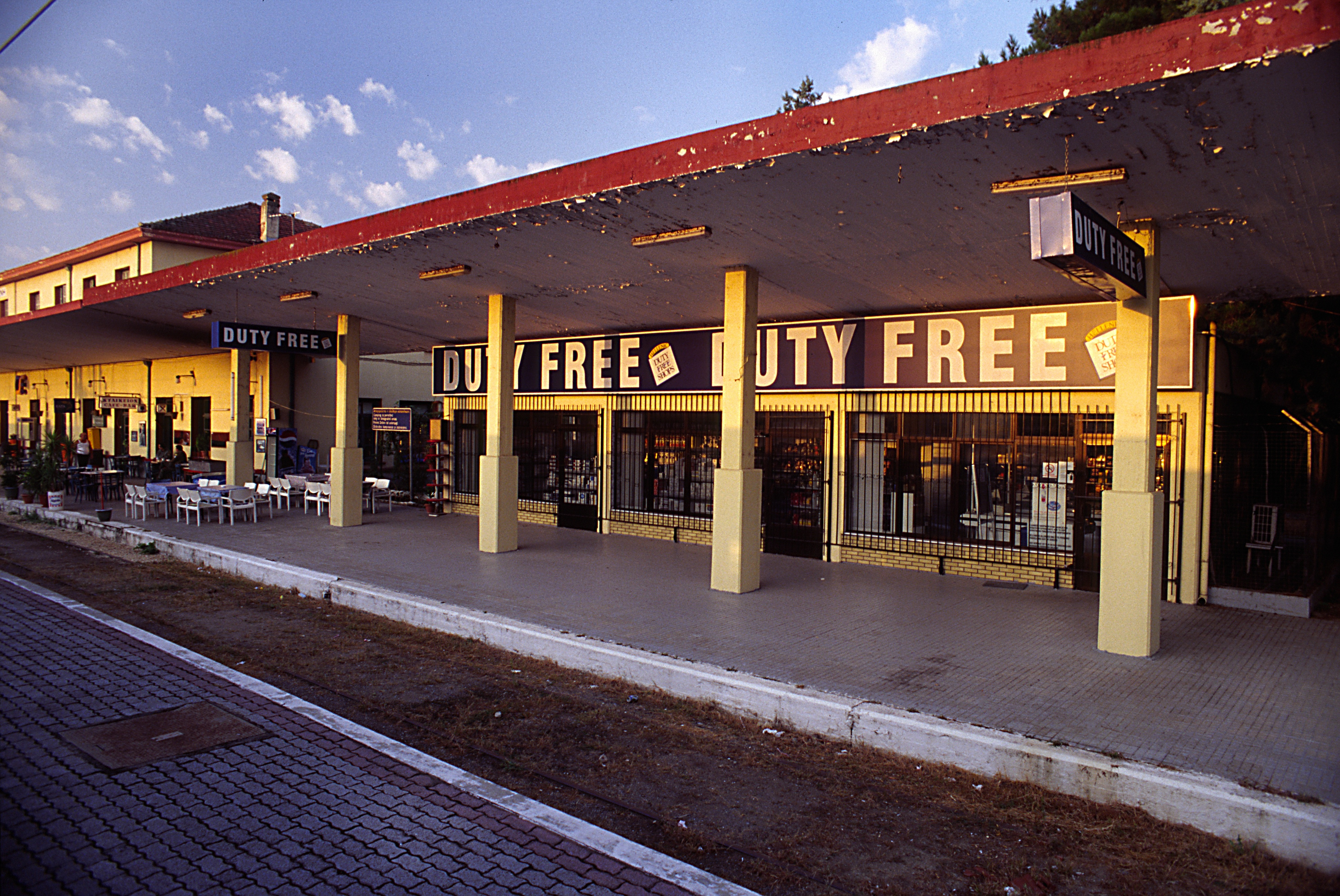

- Location within Greece
- Coordinates: 41°7′N 22°31′E
- Country: Greece
- Administrative region: Central Macedonia
- Regional unit: Kilkis
- Municipality: Paeonia
- Municipal unit: Axioupoli
- Elevation: 65 m (213 ft)

Population (2021)
  - Community: 221
- Time zone: UTC+2 (EET)
  - Summer (DST): UTC+3 (EEST)
- Postal code: 61400
- Vehicle registration: KI
- Website: www.idomeni.gr

Idomeni or Eidomeni (Greek: Ειδομένη, pronounced [iðoˈmeni]) is a small village in Greece, near the border with North Macedonia. The village is located in the municipality of Paeonia, Kilkis regional unit of Central Macedonia (Greece).

The village is built at an elevation of 65 meters, in the outskirts of Kouri hill. It mounts in the west bank of Axios river, close to the border with Republic of North Macedonia. The village is interwoven with a railway station, which is the first railway station that someone meets entering Greece from the north.

== Name ==
It was named after the ancient town of Idomene.

Before 1926, it was also known as Sehovo (Greek: Σέχοβο, Bulgarian: Сехово, Macedonian: Сехово) or Seovo (Greek: Σέοβο), and it was renamed in 1936 to the namesake of the ancient Greek town "Idomene", which was mounted near the modern village.

== History ==
During the Greek War of Independence in 1821, the inhabitants of Sechovo/Idomeni (Sechovites) revolted against the Ottoman authorities, under Zafirios Stamatiades, one of the leaders who later fought in southern Greece. The village was destroyed by the Ottoman military authorities in 1824 as a retaliation for the participation in the revolt. From 1870 until the Balkan Wars, a lot of national conflicts between Greeks and Bulgarians took place in the village. In the book "Ethnographie des Vilayets d'Adrianople, de Monastir et de Salonique", published in Constantinople in 1878, that reflects the statistics of the male population in 1873, Seovo was noted as a village with 85 households and 394 Bulgarian inhabitants. After the Russo-Turkish War (1877–78) the Bulgarian school in Sehovo was closed by Greek metropolitan bishop in Strumica.

At the Revolt of the Macedonian Greeks in 1878 against the Treaty of San Stefano, three people from the village joined armed rebel groups: Dellios Kovatsis, Stogiannis (Stoikos) Stoides and Nicolaos Stoides. During the Greek struggle for Macedonia a lot of inhabitants of Sechovo/Idomeni distinguished for their fighting for the Greek side, such as Georgios Stamatiades, his son Zafirios Stamatiades Papazafiriou, his grandsons Georgios Papazafiriou and Gregorios Papazafiriou, and also Stylianos Kovatsis. On the other hand, a committee of Internal Macedonian Revolutionary Organization (IMRO) was founded in 1895–1896. A lot of inhabitants of Sechovo distinguished for their fighting for the Bulgarian side, such as voyvode of IMRO Argir Manasiev (1872-1932), Dimitar Dzuzdanov (1887-1929), Grigor Totev (1868-1934), Gono Balabanov etc.

The "La Macédoine et sa Population Chrétienne" survey by Dimitar Mishev (D. Brankov) concluded that the Christian population in Sehovo in 1905 was composed of 1120 Bulgarian Exarchists.

== Transportation ==
=== Rail ===
Close to Idomeni, there is the Railway Station of Idomeni, with fast trains to Thessaloniki, Belgrade and Central Europe.

== Migrants ==
Since 2014, immigrants from Syria, as well as Afghanistan, Pakistan and other parts of the Middle East and South Asia began to flock to Idomeni to enter the North Macedonia via the Greek border. As North Macedonia and its northern neighbor Serbia are not in the Schengen Area, some refugees prefer this route to reach countries such as Germany and Sweden. Re-entering the Schengen Area from Serbia may result in arrest and possibly being held in Croatia or Hungary which are closer to their preferred immigration destinations, notably Germany.

In 2015, North Macedonia began guarding its borders with military force to prevent migrants from entering the country since Serbia too closed its borders.

The transit camp at Idomeni, built in 2015 by Médecins Sans Frontières and the UNHCR to provide basic support for up to 6000 refugees daily, rapidly became a longer-term residential camp. The number of refugees at Idomeni has reached more than 15,000. On 24 May 2016, Greek authorities began relocating refugees from the Idomeni camp to processing facilities in and around Thessaloniki.

=== Migrant living conditions in Idomeni ===
Refugees into Greece have faced severe human rights violations in the past two decades. Due to the collapse of their economy following the 2008 financial crisis, the country no longer had enough funds or resources to support the massive influx of refugees fleeing the wars in the Middle East. Many camps lack electricity, sanitation, and adequate food supply, leading to sickness amongst their dwellers. One out of every 3 refugees is a child, but they are subject to the same unsafe conditions as the others. In M.S.S. vs Belgium and Greece, the European Court of Human Rights decided that Greece was unfit to house more refugees.

==== Sh.D. and Others v. Greece, Austria, Croatia, Hungary, North Macedonia, Serbia and Slovenia ====
On 15 March 2016, Sh.D. vs Greece was decided by the European Court of Human Rights (ECHR). After Greece demanded deportation of the five minors, four of them came to Idomeni Refugee Camp, where they remained for about one month. After experiencing unsafe living conditions at the camp, the four refugees complained under Article 3 of the European Convention of Human Rights, which protects against inhuman or degrading treatment.

Idomeni Camp is suitable to house 1,500 refugees, but an estimated 13,000 people lived there during the period in which the minors lodged. Additionally, the minors complained that there was little to no sanitation. Precedent in the European Court of Human Rights establishes that countries are required to aid unaccompanied foreign minors, and that the migrant’s fragile status as a minor supersedes their status as an illegal immigrant. Therefore, The ECHR unanimously found that Greece was in violation of Article 3 because the four unaccompanied minor refugees were subject to inhumane conditions “unfit to their age and circumstances” and required Greece to pay the petitioners 6,000 euros each.

Importantly, the Idomeni Camp was set up by refugees, and Greece itself had no legal authority over the region. However, the court maintained that Greece had not done enough work to alleviate the humanitarian crisis happening within its borders. The complaints against all other countries were deemed manifestly ill-founded.

==== Medical care in Idomeni Refugee Camp ====
During October 2015, 211,180 refugees passed through Idomeni, 22% of which were children. NGO Médecins Du Monde oversaw all medical treatment in the camp, as the camp did not receive governmental support. Following a multitrauma injury to an eight-year-old child in the camp, several shortcomings in the medical facilities were uncovered. Most notably:

- There was no emergency trauma kit
- The oxygen tank was empty
- There was no backup device for fluid resuscitation if veins were inaccessible for an IV
- There was no pediatric cuff for the blood pressure reader
- There were no IV antibiotics on-site.

Although the camp identified and has begun to rectify these failures, the under-supported medical staff leaves the camp volatile.
