= Thessaloniki–Skopje railway =

European railway line

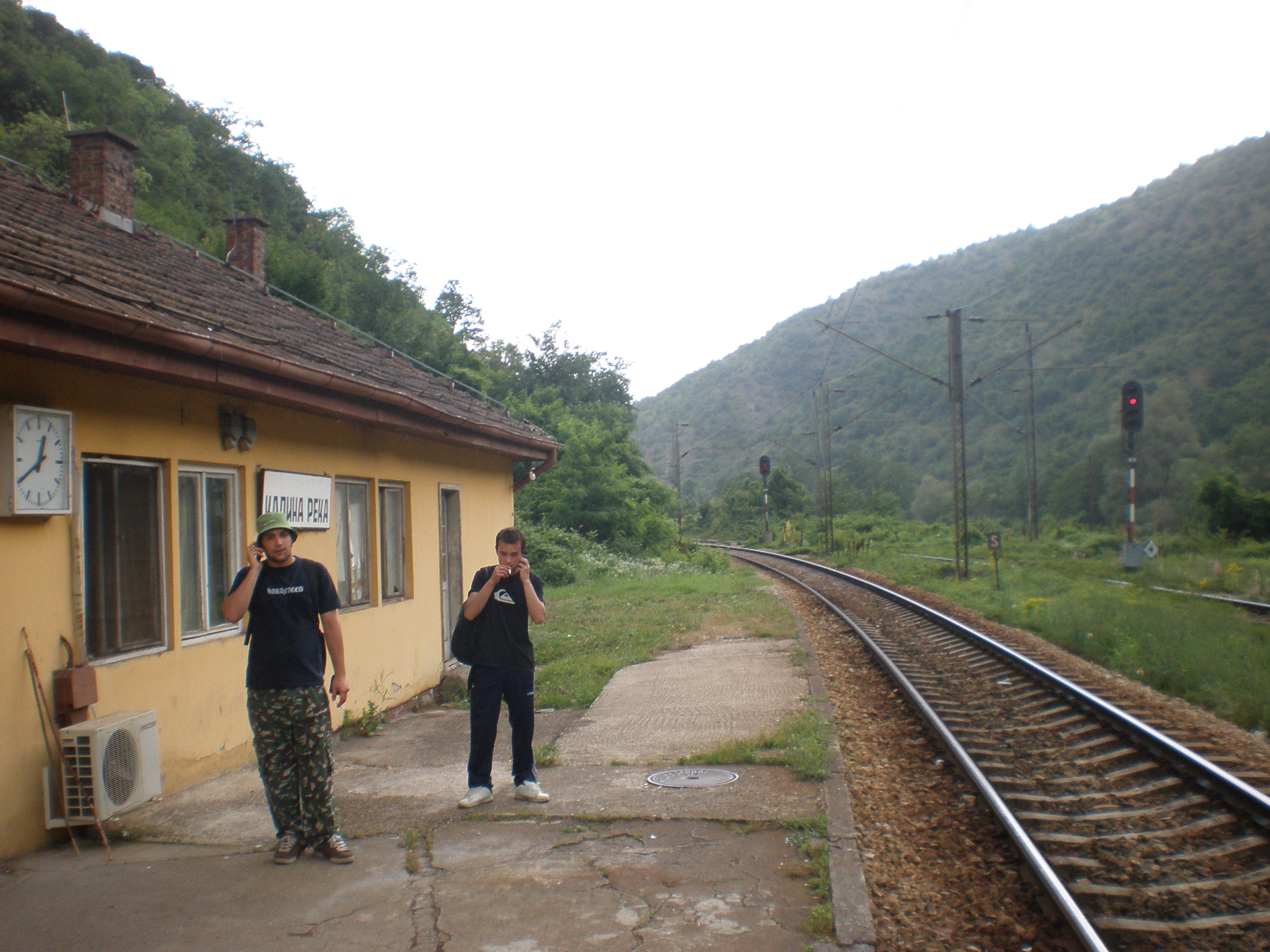
- Kadina Reka station (Northern Macedonia) in 2010.

Overview
- Status: Operational
- Owner: GAIAOSE (Greek section)
- Locale: Skopje, Vardar, Northern Macedonia Central Macedonia, Greece
- Termini: Thessaloniki 40.3840°N 22.5546°E; Skopje 41.7734°N 26.1451°E
- Stations: 6

Service
- Type: railway line
- Services: Intercity (international)
- Operator(s): Hellenic Train, Macedonian Railways

History
- Opened: 1873

Technical
- Line length: 21.69 km (13.48 mi) (Greek section) 240 km (150 mi) (whole length)
- Number of tracks: Single
- Track gauge: 1,435 mm (4 ft 8 1/2 in) standard gauge
- Electrification: 25 kV AC
- Operating speed: 130 km/h (81 mph) (maximum)

The Thessaloniki–Skopje railway (known as Eidomenis-Thessaloniki line in its Greek section) is an 240-kilometre-long (150 mi) transnational railway line that connects the port city Thessaloniki in Greece with Skopje in the North Macedonia. An important railway line in Northern Greece, Used for long-distance passenger and commercial traffic, Its importance justifies the fact that it is part of the main Greek railway trunk PATHE (Patra-Athens-Thessaloniki-Eidomeni) and its inclusion in development projects such as that of the Axios river variant. Its southern terminus is Thessaloniki, where there are connections to Athens and Alexandroupoli.

== Stations ==
The stations on the line are

- Skopje
- Veles
- Gradsko
- Gevgelija
- Kadina Reka
- Idomeni
- Thessaloniki

== History ==
The Thessaloniki–Skopje line was opened in 1872 as part of the historical network of the Chemins de fer Orientaux' (English: Oriental Railway; Turkish: Rumeli Demiryolu or İstanbul-Viyana Demiryolu) (reporting mark: CO). During this period, Northern Greece and the southern Balkans were still under Ottoman rule. Construction of the line had been charted in 1870, with work commencing in 1872, with the aim of linking Thessaloniki and Skopje with Belgrade and consequently with the main European railnetwork. The project was undertaken by the Bavarian-Jewish banker Maurice de Hirsch. The territory of Northern Greece was annexed by Greece on 18 October 1912 during the First Balkan War. On 17 October 1925, The Greek government purchased the Greek sections of the former Chemins de fer Orientaux and the railway became part of the Hellenic State Railways. In 1970 OSE became the legal successor to the SEK, taking over responsibilities for most of Greece's rail infrastructure. On 1 January 1971, the station and most of the Greek rail infrastructure where transferred to the Hellenic Railways Organisation S.A., a state-owned corporation. Freight traffic declined sharply when the state-imposed monopoly of OSE for the transport of agricultural products and fertilisers ended in the early 1990s. Many small stations of the network with little passenger traffic were closed down. In 1998 the line was electrified at 25,000V/50 Hz, compatible with the European system. In 2009, with the Greek debt crisis unfolding OSE's Management was forced to reduce services across the network. Timetables were cut back, and routes closed as the government-run entity attempted to reduce overheads. The line was downgraded, cutting passenger local, regional and suburban services while only maintaining connections to other European countries and for specific times of the year (summer tourist season). In 2011 all international railway routes from Thessaloniki to Skopje and Belgrade were interrupted. In 2017 OSE's passenger transport sector was privatised as TrainOSE, currently, a wholly owned subsidiary of Ferrovie dello Stato Italiane infrastructure, including stations, remained under the control of OSE. In December 2019 Costas Karamanlis, the Greek Minister of Infrastructure and Transport intervened over safety concerns for one of the tunnels on the line.

== Future ==
In December 2020, it was reported that the long-awaited upgrades to the line were moving forward. The Installation of a modern signalling system, as well as ETCS-level 1, in the section between Thessaloniki and Eidomeni, 70.5-kilometre-long (43.8 mi) and the replacement of 37 track changes, In fact, this project includes the modernization of TX1, which is the largest railway junction in the country and thus considered extremely critical to improving the connectivity between Greece and Northern Macedonia. The project is worth €45.75 million (excluding VAT), with bids originally to be submitted by February 2021, with a construction time of 6 years envisaged. Once this project is completed, the way is open for the resumption of international passenger routes with the Western Balkans and Central Europe.

The Polikastro–Eidomeni upgrade started in 2007, and was completed in 2022. The 21-kilometre-long (13 mi) section of the Eidomenis-Thessaloniki line involved 1 new railway station (Polykastro), 1 upgraded railway station (Eidomenis), and a new railway halt (Mikron Dasos). Line speed for this section has increased to 160 km/h (99 mph) with new signalling, telecommunications and electricity conversion.

The freight project is quite important, for the data of the Greek railway, as in addition to the connection of the Port of Thessaloniki with the Balkan countries, it offers a connection between the Port of Piraeus with Central Europe.

== Services ==
In 2014 cross-border services were resumed. As of 2020 services have been suspended on the line, awaiting upgrades.

== See also ==
- Chemins de fer Orientaux
- French-Hellenic Railway Company (CFFH)
