= Kumanovo railway station =

Railway station in Kumanovo, North Macedonia

Kumanovo railway station Железничка станица Куманово Stacioni hekurudhor Kumanovë
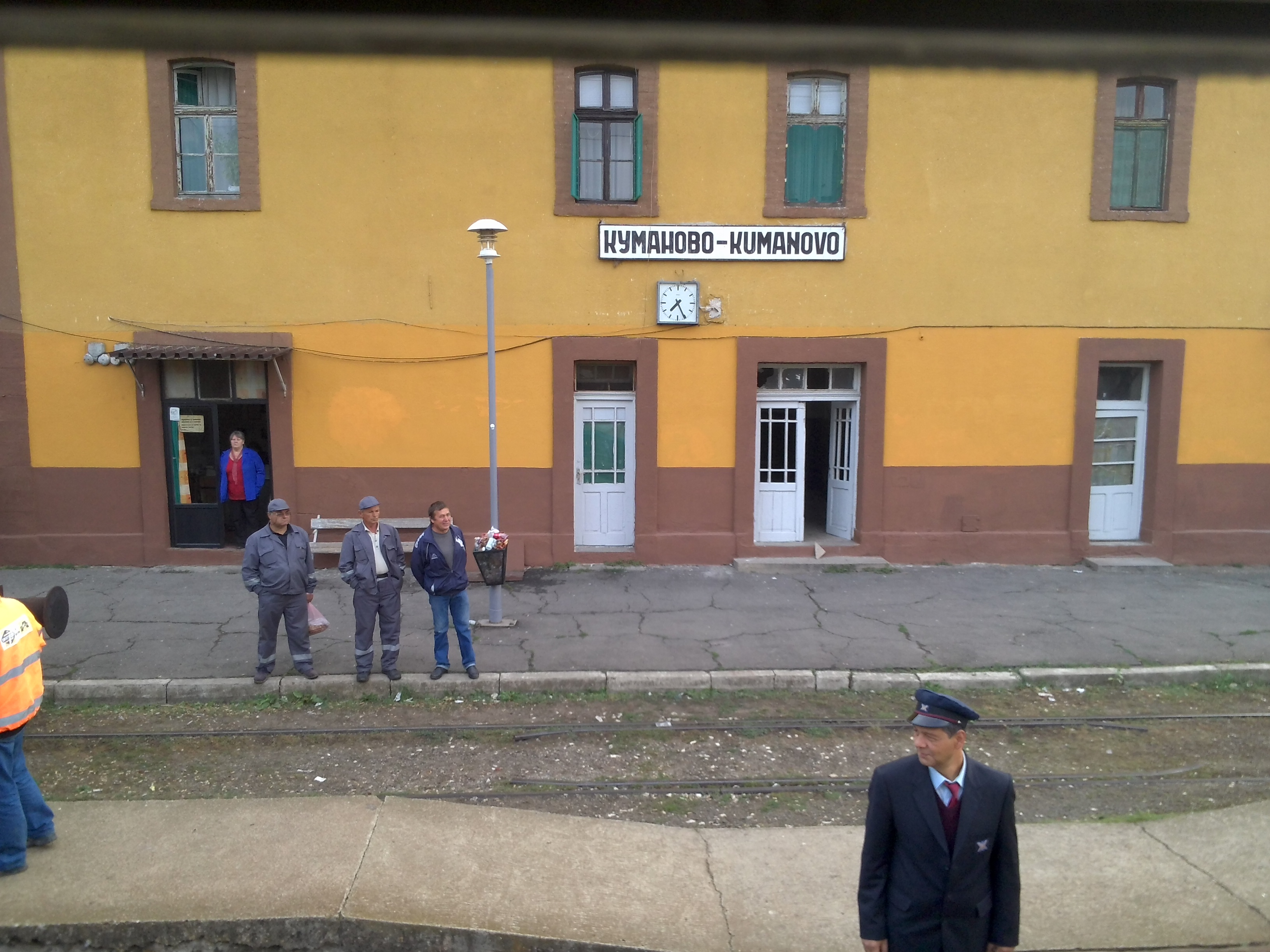
- View of the station buildings, October 2012

General information
- Location: Zheleznichka Stanica bb, Kumanovo, North Macedonia
- Coordinates: 42.1301°N 21.6850°E
- Owner: Makedonski Železnici
- Lines: Corridor VIII; Corridor X
- Train operators: Makedonski Železnici

Construction
- Structure type: at-grade
- Parking: yes

Other information
- Status: Staffed

Services
Preceding station	Hellenic Train	Following station
Makedonski Železnici
Tabanovce towards Belgrade	Hellas	Skopje towards Thessaloniki
Location
- Location within North Macedonia

Kumanovo railway station (KRS) (Macedonian: Железничка станица Куманово; Albanian: Stacioni hekurudhor Kumanovë) is the main railway station in Kumanovo, North Macedonia.

== History ==
The station was built in the time of Ottoman Empire in 1873. Radomir Putnik was at the station in the First Balkan War. Former SFRY Marshal Josip Broz Tito visited Kumanovo on 7 March 1957 and was greeted from 50.000 people at the station. In Oct 2015 several unexploded grenades were found at the Station, according to the Regional Crisis Management Center. In total 18x 60mm grenade launchers, 4x 75mm grenade launchers, 2x 20mm anti-aircraft bullets, 8x grenade launchers, and a single cracked shell casings were recovered. The area was later cleared, and the weapons removed to a safe location.

In April 2021 it was announced that the station would be upgraded and modernized, as part of the IPA program and the plan for the construction of the first and second phases of Corridor 8, the railway from Kumanovo-Beljakovce-Kriva Palanka. It is expected the tender procedure to be completed by the summer and construction to begin soon after.

== Facilities ==
The station is staffed and can be contacted during opening hours.+389 (0) 31 / 421-707

== Services ==
The station is serviced by a number of local, long-distance, and international services, with six trains arriving from Skopje at 6:30, 8:20, 16:18, 19:00, 22:14, 23:00 daily, and two from Belgrade at 07:45 & 18:50, with six trains departing to Skopje 03:55, 05:27, 07:58, 16:50, 17:51, 20:27 and two for Belgrade at 08:51, 22:45 daily.

== Controversy ==
In 2011 international train Belgrade-Skopje was attacked near the station.

== 2019 Fire ==
On 12 August, at around 17:00 a large fire broke out near the Railway Station. The local fire brigade later reported that a large number of old thresholds (removed during the reconstruction and upgrade work) were set alight, which because they are covered with bitumen develop a high temperature and emitted toxic black smoke. The fire was contained and did not spread to other buildings. SIA Kumanovo reports that from 17.40 the railway traffic on the Kumanovo-Tabanovce line is interrupted. The cause of the fire is still unknown.
