= Idomeni railway station =

Railway station in Kilkis, Greece

Ειδομένη Idomeni

General information
- Location: Paionia 614 00, Paionia, Kilkis; Greece
- Coordinates: 41°07′15″N 22°31′05″E
- Owner: GAIAOSE
- Operator: Hellenic Train
- Line: Thessaloniki–Skopje railway
- Platforms: 3
- Tracks: 14
- Train operators: Hellenic Train, Serbian Railways, Makedonski Železnici

Construction
- Structure type: at-grade
- Platform levels: 1
- Parking: Yes
- Cycle facilities: No

Other information
- Status: Staffed
- Website: http://www.ose.gr/en/

History
- Opened: 1947
- Electrified: 25 kV AC, 50 Hz
Former services
Preceding station	Hellenic Train	Following station
Gevgelija towards Belgrade	Hellas Express	Thessaloniki Terminus
Location
- Location within Greece

Idomeni railway station (Greek: Σιδηροδρομικός σταθμός Ειδομένης, romanized: Sidirodromikós stathmós Idoménis) is a railway station serving the settlement of Idomeni in Kilkis, Central Macedonia, Greece. Opened in 1947, it is located on the Thessaloniki–Skopje railway just east of the town centre. The station is ordinarily served by trains from Thessaloniki to Skopje and Belgrade.

== History ==
The station was opened in 1947. On 1 January 1971, the station was transferred to the Hellenic Railways Organisation (OSE), a state-owned corporation and the legal successor to the Hellenic State Railways (SEK). Freight traffic declined sharply when OSE's state-imposed monopoly on the transport of agricultural products and fertilisers ended in the early 1990s, and many small stations of the network with low passenger traffic were closed. The station was reopened on 9 September 2007. In 2009, with the Greek debt crisis unfolding, OSE management was forced to reduce services across the network. Timetables were cut back, and routes closed as the government-run entity attempted to reduce overheads. International services were suspended in 2011 before being restored in May 2014. International services were again suspended in March 2020 due to the COVID-19 pandemic.

The station building is owned by GAIAOSE, which since 3 October 2001 owns most railway stations in Greece: the company was also in charge of rolling stock from December 2014 until October 2025, when Greek Railways (the owner of the Piraeus–Platy railway) took over that responsibility.

== Facilities ==
The station has waiting rooms and a staffed ticket office. The station has no buffet, but a restaurant is located next door. Parking in the forecourt is available.

== See also ==
- Thessaloniki Urban Transport Organization
- Railways of Greece
- Greek railway stations
- Greek Railways
- Hellenic Train
