= Dobova–Ljubljana Railway =

Railway line in Slovenia

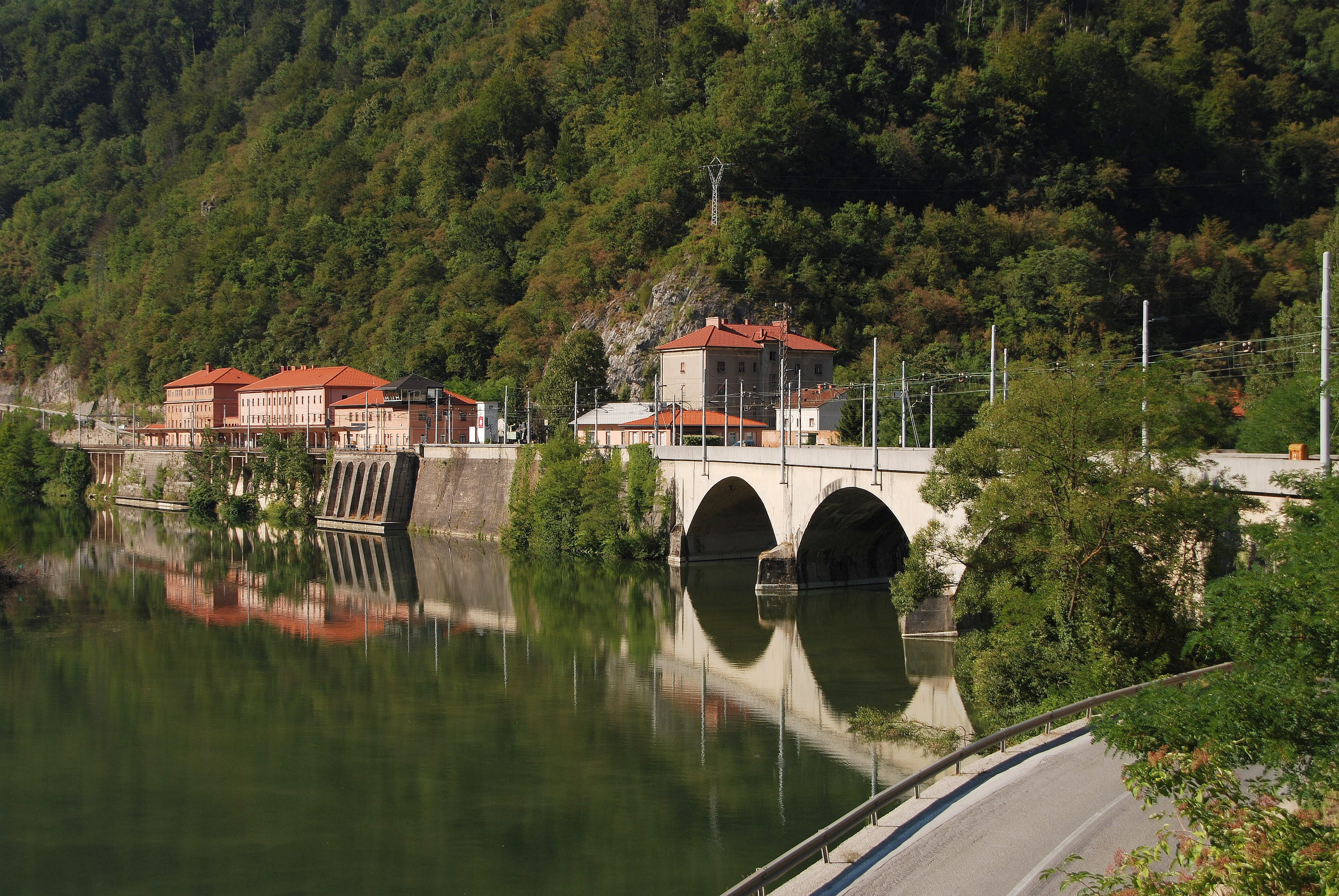
- Railway bridge and station in Zidani Most

Overview
- Line number: 10 (Sž)

Technical
- Line length: 114.8 km (71.3 mi)
- Track gauge: 1435 mm
- Electrification: 3 kV DC
- Operating speed: 160 km/h (99.4 mph) max.

The Dobova–Ljubljana Railway (Slovene: Železniška proga Dobova–Ljubljana) is a 114.7-kilometre (71.3 mi) long, double-tracked railway line in Slovenia, which is operated by Slovenske železnice Infrastruktura d.o.o. It is electrified with 3 kV DC from Ljubljana to Dobova and 25 kV AC from Dobova to the national border, where it connects to Croatian railway network, specifically the M101 line extending to Zagreb.

The railway line follows the Sava Valley and is integral part of Pan-European Corridor X, running from Salzburg through Ljubljana and Zagreb towards Skopje and Thessaloniki. It was the route of the Orient Express service from 1919 to 1977.

== See also ==
- Pan-European Corridor X
