= Podšentjur =

Podšentjur Šent Jurij (until 1955)
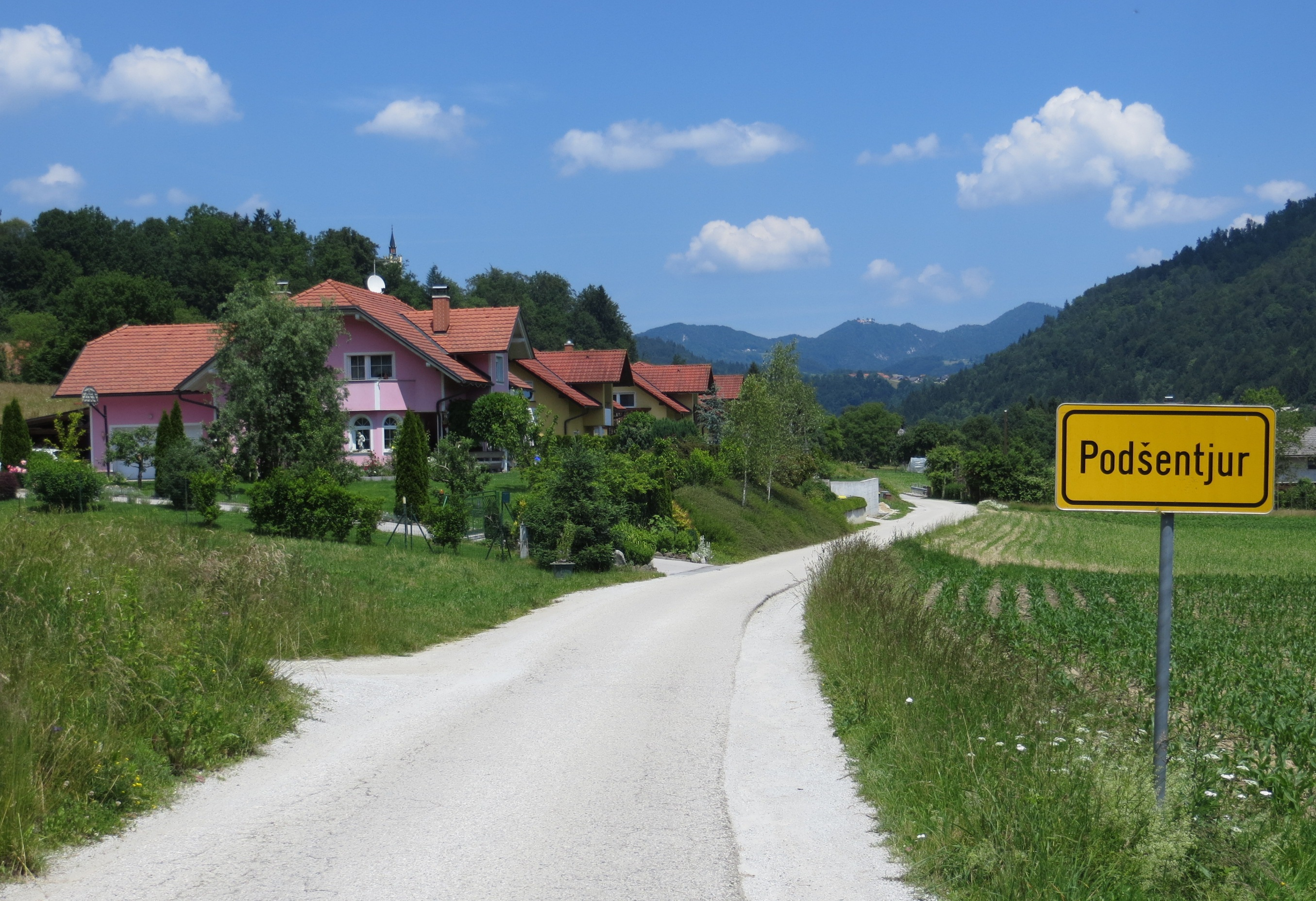

- Location in Slovenia
- Coordinates: 46°4′20.55″N 14°49′2.85″E
- Country: Slovenia
- Traditional region: Lower Carniola
- Statistical region: Central Sava
- Municipality: Litija

Area
  - Total: 2.91 km^{2} (1.12 sq mi)
- Elevation: 249.8 m (820 ft)

Population (2002)
  - Total: 69
- Postal code: 1270

Podšentjur (pronounced [pɔtʃɛnˈtjuːɾ] or [pɔtʃənˈtjuːɾ]; German: Sankt Georgen) is a settlement on the right bank of the Sava River in the Municipality of Litija in central Slovenia. The area is part of the traditional region of Lower Carniola. It is now included with the rest of the municipality in the Central Sava Statistical Region.

== Name ==
The name of the settlement was changed from Šent Jurij (literally, 'Saint George') to Podšentjur (literally, 'below Saint George') in 1955. The name was changed on the basis of the 1948 Law on Names of Settlements and Designations of Squares, Streets, and Buildings as part of efforts by Slovenia's postwar communist government to remove religious elements from toponyms. In the 19th century the German name was Sankt Georgen.

== Church ==
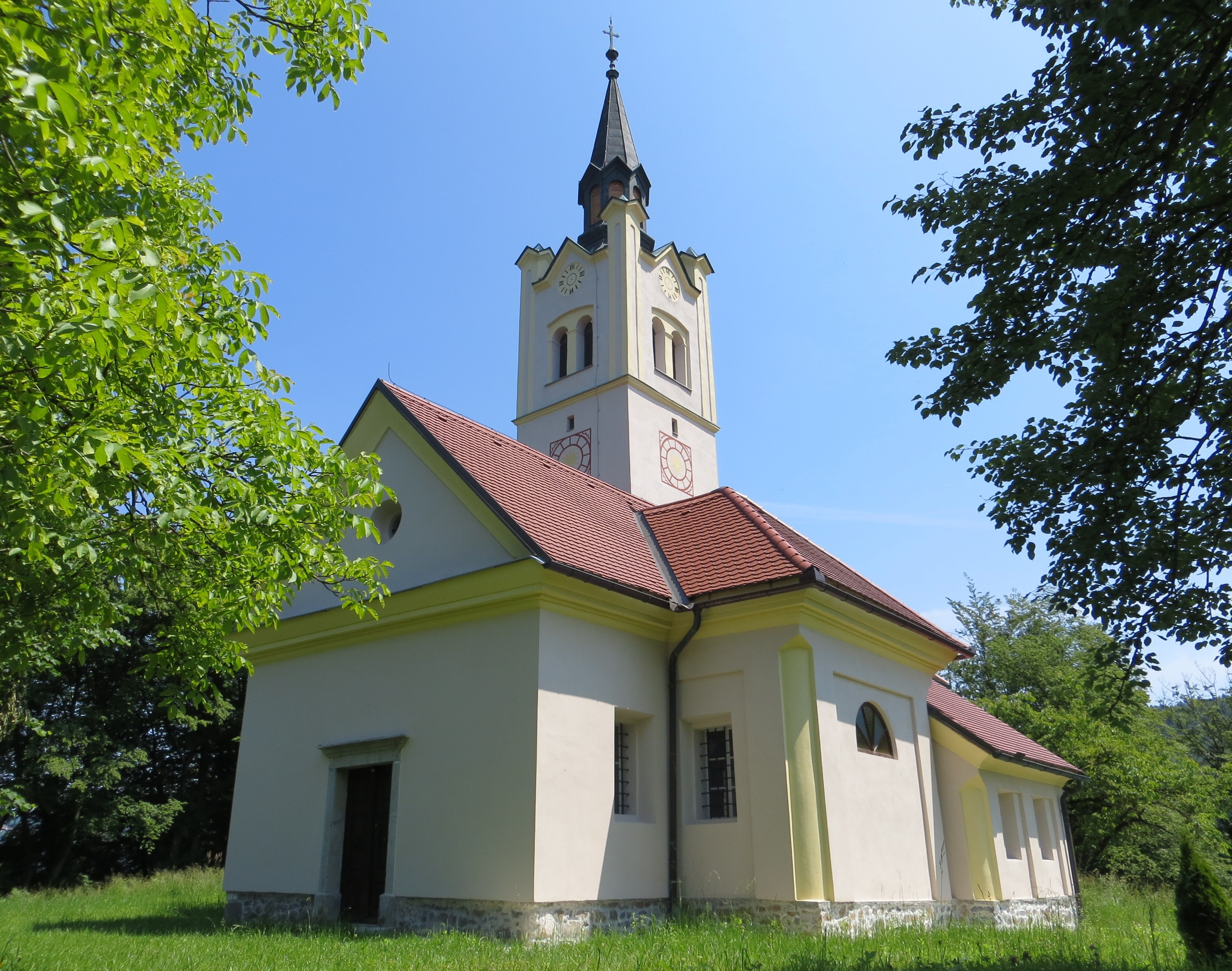
Saint George's Church

The local church is dedicated to Saint George (Slovene: sveti Jurij) and belongs to the Parish of Litija. It was built in the 17th century.
