= Zgornji Hotič =

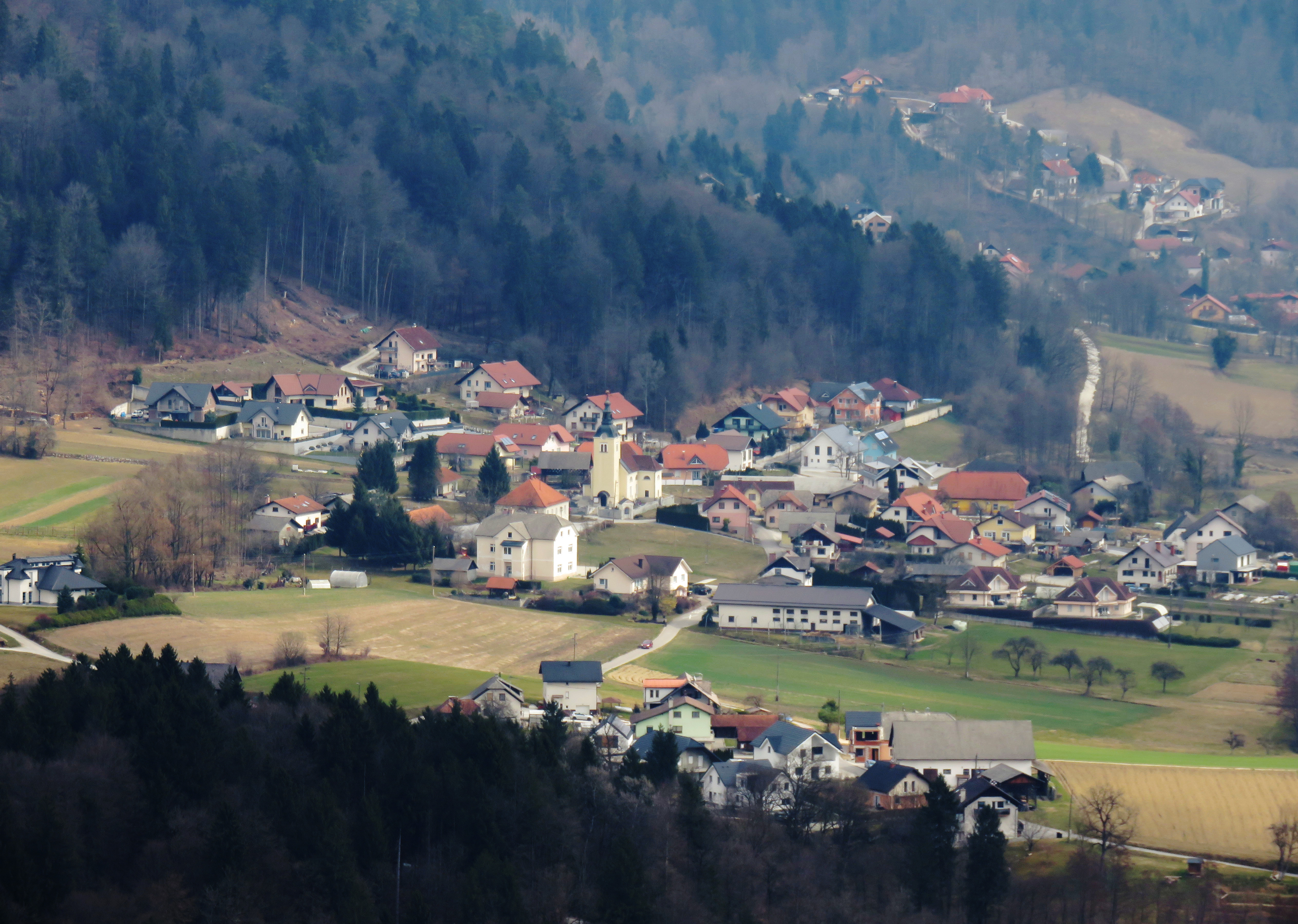

- Location in Slovenia
- Coordinates: 46°5′25.31″N 14°48′47.28″E
- Country: Slovenia
- Traditional region: Upper Carniola
- Statistical region: Central Sava
- Municipality: Litija

Area
  - Total: 1.11 km^{2} (0.43 sq mi)
- Elevation: 262.3 m (861 ft)

Population (2002)
  - Total: 219
- Postal code: 1270

Zgornji Hotič (pronounced [ˈzɡoːɾnji xɔˈtitʃ]; in older sources also Zgornje Hotiče, German: Oberhöttisch) is a settlement on the left bank of the Sava River in the Municipality of Litija in central Slovenia. The area is part of the traditional region of Upper Carniola and is now included with the rest of the municipality in the Central Sava Statistical Region.

== Church ==
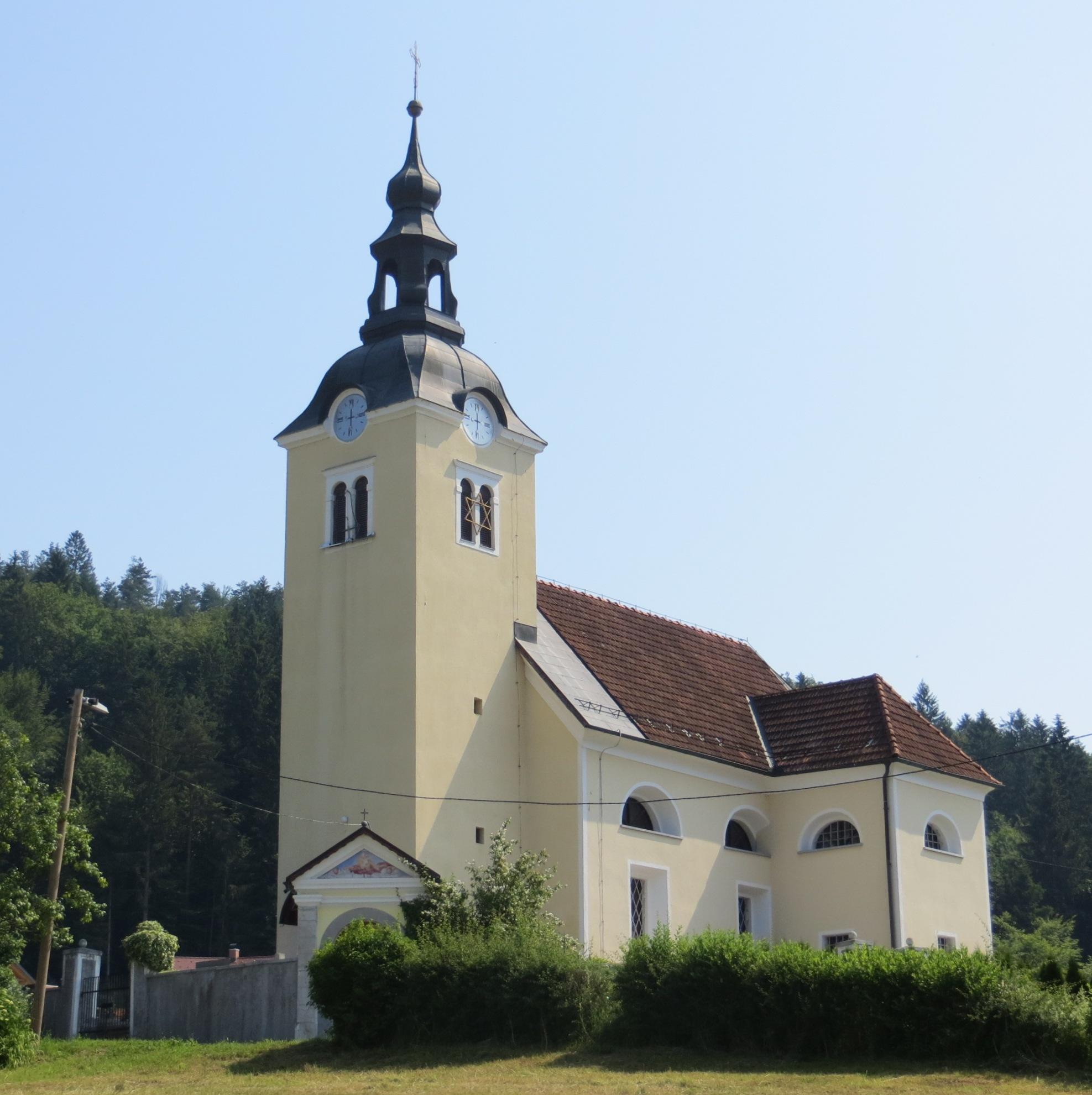
Saint Helena's Church

The parish church in the settlement is dedicated to Saint Helena and belongs to the Roman Catholic Archdiocese of Ljubljana. It was built in 1686.

== Notable people ==
Notable people that were born or lived in Zgornji Hotič, or with ancestry from Zgornji Hotič, include:

- Ivan Bajde (1855–1920), musical inventor
