= Transportation Center Skopje =

Railway and bus station in Skopje, North Macedonia

Transportation Center Skopje Транспортен центар Скопје Qendra transportuese e Shkupit
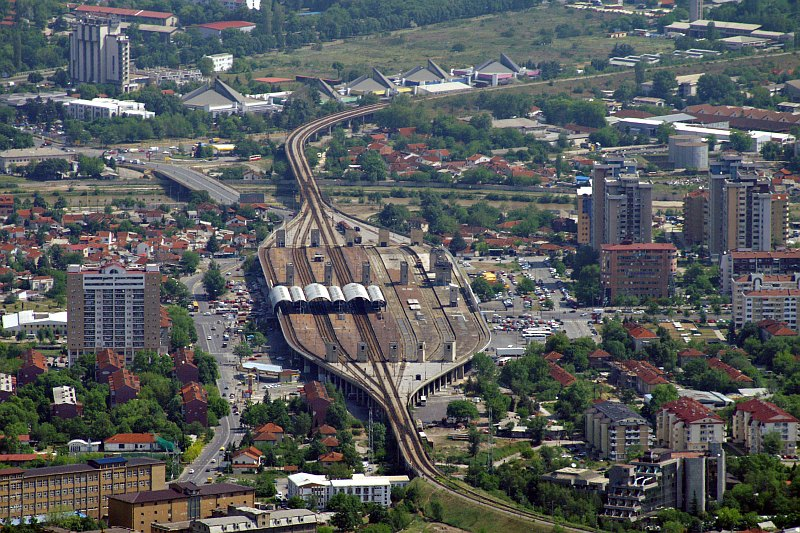
- Skopje Train and Bus Station from Mount Vodno

General information
- Location: Bul. Kuzman Josifovski Pitu 1000 Skopje; Greater Skopje; North Macedonia
- Coordinates: 41.9909°N 21.4465°E
- Owner: Makedonski Železnici
- Lines: Skopje - Tabanovce; Skopje - Veles; Skopje - Kičevo; Skopje - Thessaloniki
- Platforms: 6
- Tracks: 10
- Train operators: ŽRSMT

Construction
- Structure type: At-grade
- Platform levels: 3
- Parking: Yes
- Cycle facilities: No
- Architect: Kenzo Tange
- Architectural style: Brutalism, Late Modernism

Other information
- Status: Staffed
- Station code: 6500001

History
- Opened: 27 July 1981
- Rebuilt: 1971-1981
- Electrified: 25 kV AC, 50 Hz
Location
- Location within North Macedonia

The Transportation Center Skopje, or Skopje railway station (Macedonian: Транспортен центар Скопје; Albanian: Qendra transportuese e Shkupit / Macedonian: Железничка станица Скопје; Albanian: Stacioni hekurudhor i Shkupit) is the main central passenger railway station and bus terminal in the Republic of North Macedonia capital Skopje. It was built after the 1963 Skopje earthquake that destroyed the original station buildings, and much of the city. There are 10 tracks placed on a massive concrete bridge 2 kilometres (1.2 mi) long. The Skopje railway station is 15 min walking from the main square Makedonija.

== History ==
The station was built following the 1963 Skopje earthquake that hit on 26 July 1963 which destroyed the original station buildings. The old station building has become a symbol of the earthquake, with the clock stopped at 5.17 and now houses the Museum of the City of Skopje (Muzej na grad Skopje). After the earthquake, a project was started for a major reconstruction of the city, authored by Kenzo Tange, a Japanese architect, but which has not been fully implemented. The station was rebuilt in the Brutalist style of architecture. It was completed in 1981.

The construction is supported by earthquake-proof concrete pillars and covered by a tubular platform hall. Below the platforms are the counter and waiting rooms, which are separated from the street by glass facades. The interiors are designed with exposed concrete walls and ceilings in the Brutalist style. The bus station located under the tracks was opened in 2004.

The station was originally designed for 18 million passengers per year, but this was never fully realised, as a result five of the ten track troughs remained unused. After the collapse of Yugoslavia, the structural condition of the station complex deteriorated increasingly. From 2014 to 2015, Makedonski Železnici Infrastruktura renovated the station for 2.5 million euros. In 2017, the station was used by 193,000 passengers.

In 2020 The EU Delegation North Macedonia funded the City of Skopje in turning a corner of its transport centre into an urban bike-parking, thus responding to the needs of a constantly growing number of cyclists. It was termed Veloštad, from velosiped = bicycle and ploštad = square.

== Gallery ==
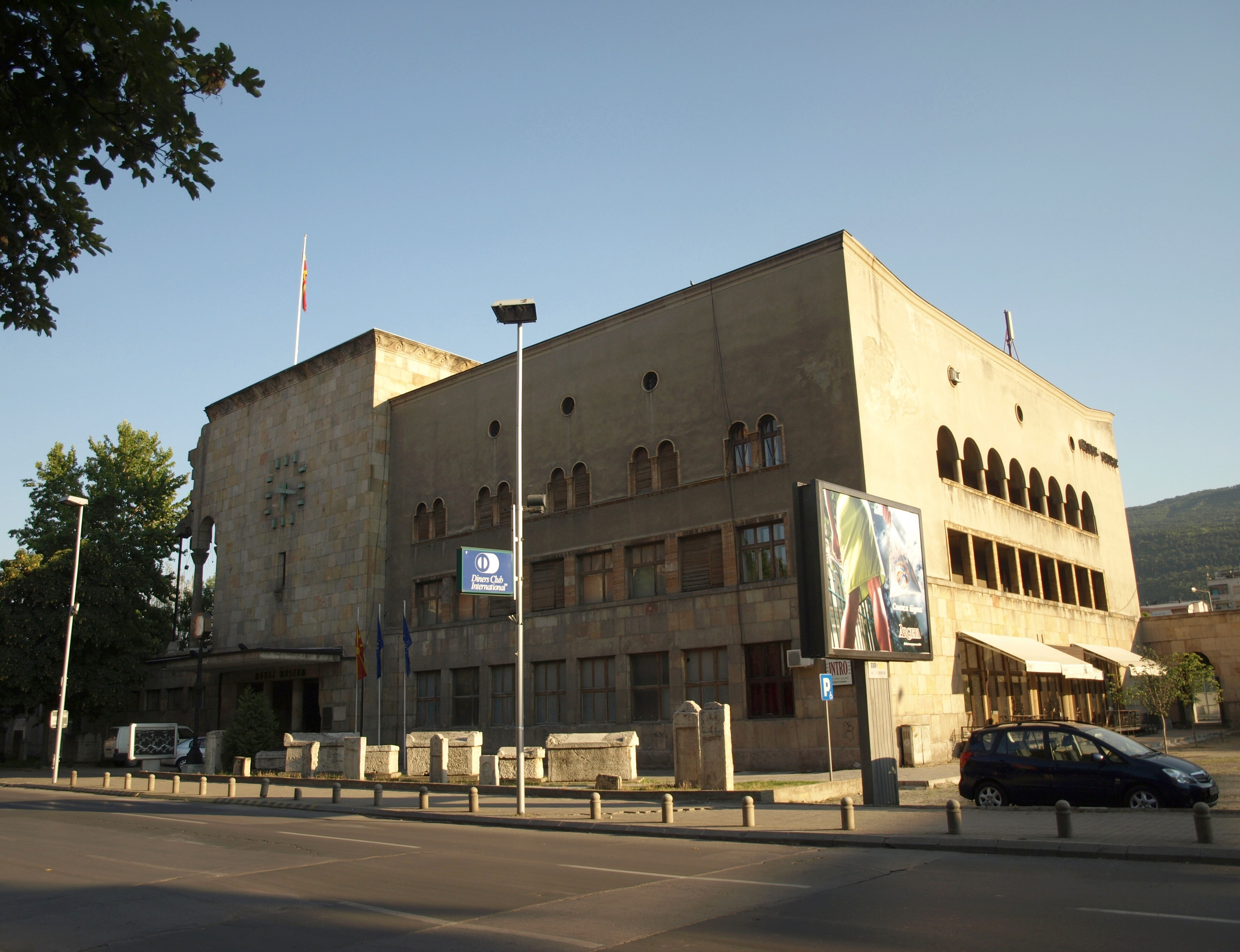
Old station building, rebuilt in 1940, and destroyed in 1963. Today it houses a museum, April 2010.

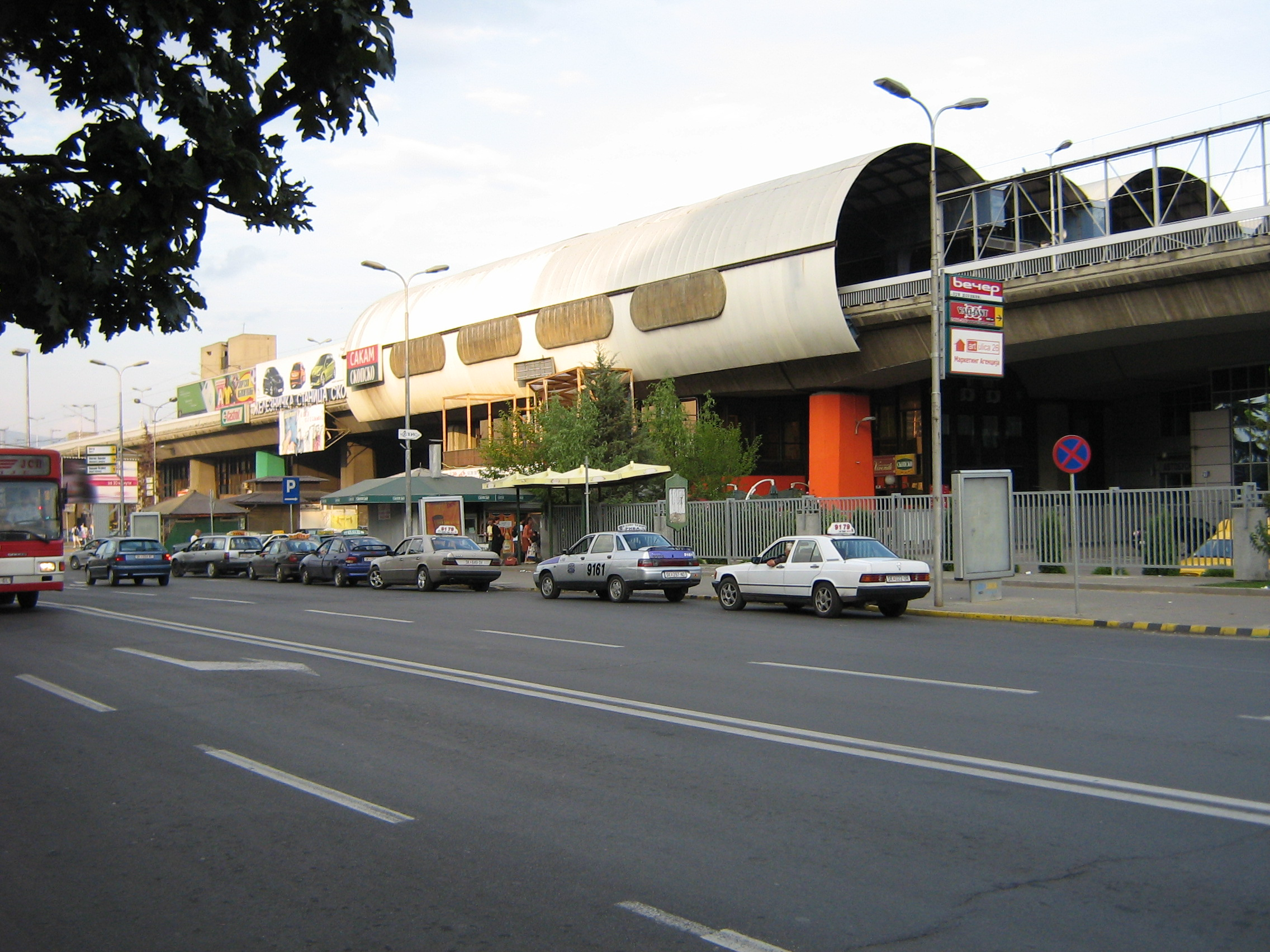
Part of the "Transport Center" complex in Skopje, which includes the Central Railway Station, the Intercity Bus Station, public city transport hub, postal hub, and a traffic control center.

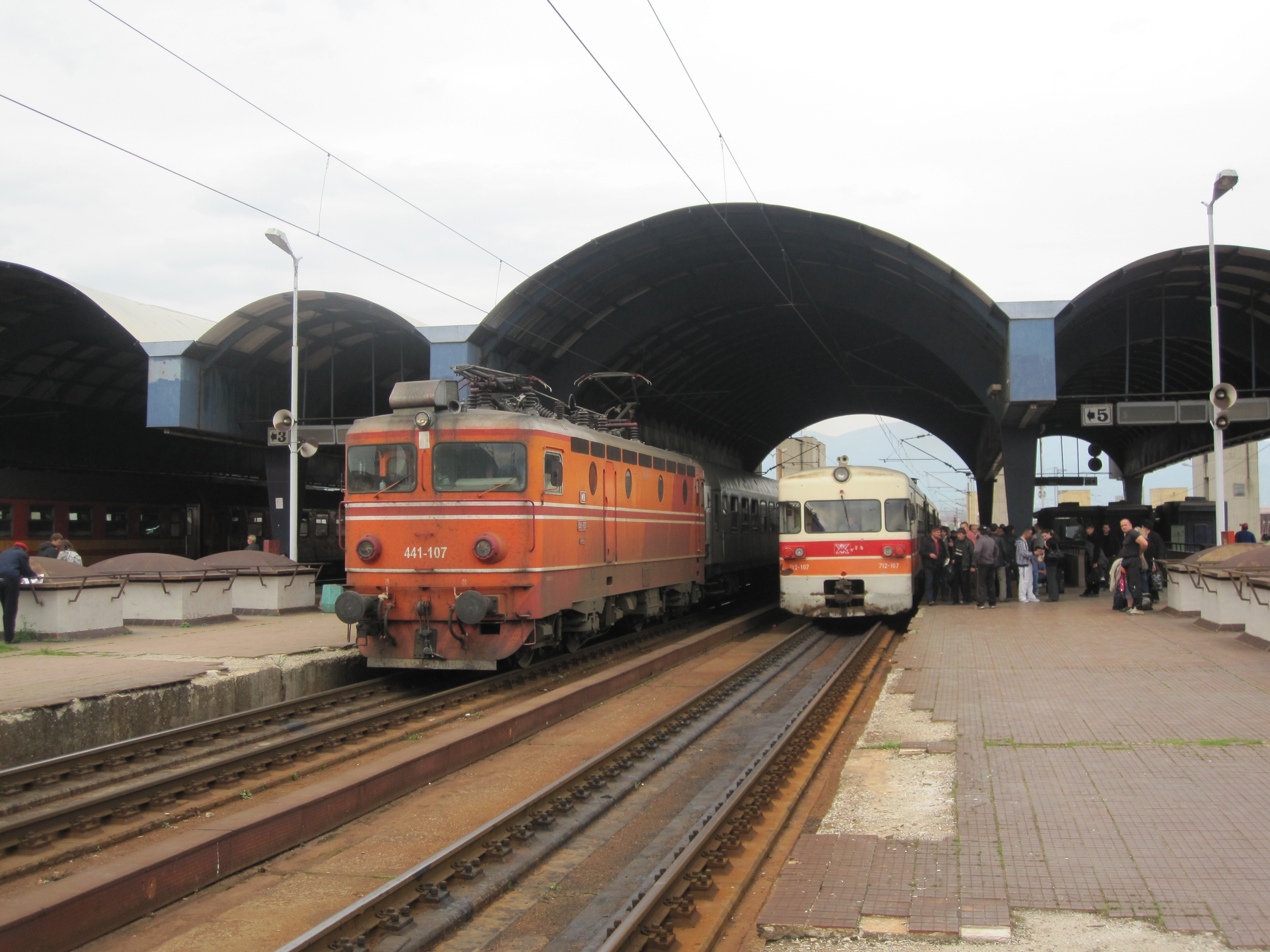
Mid-afternoon at Skopje. On the left, 441.107 on the daytime service from Beograd to Thessaloniki which sits at Skopje for about half an hour. On the right, DMU on a late departing service to Kičevo., April 2010.

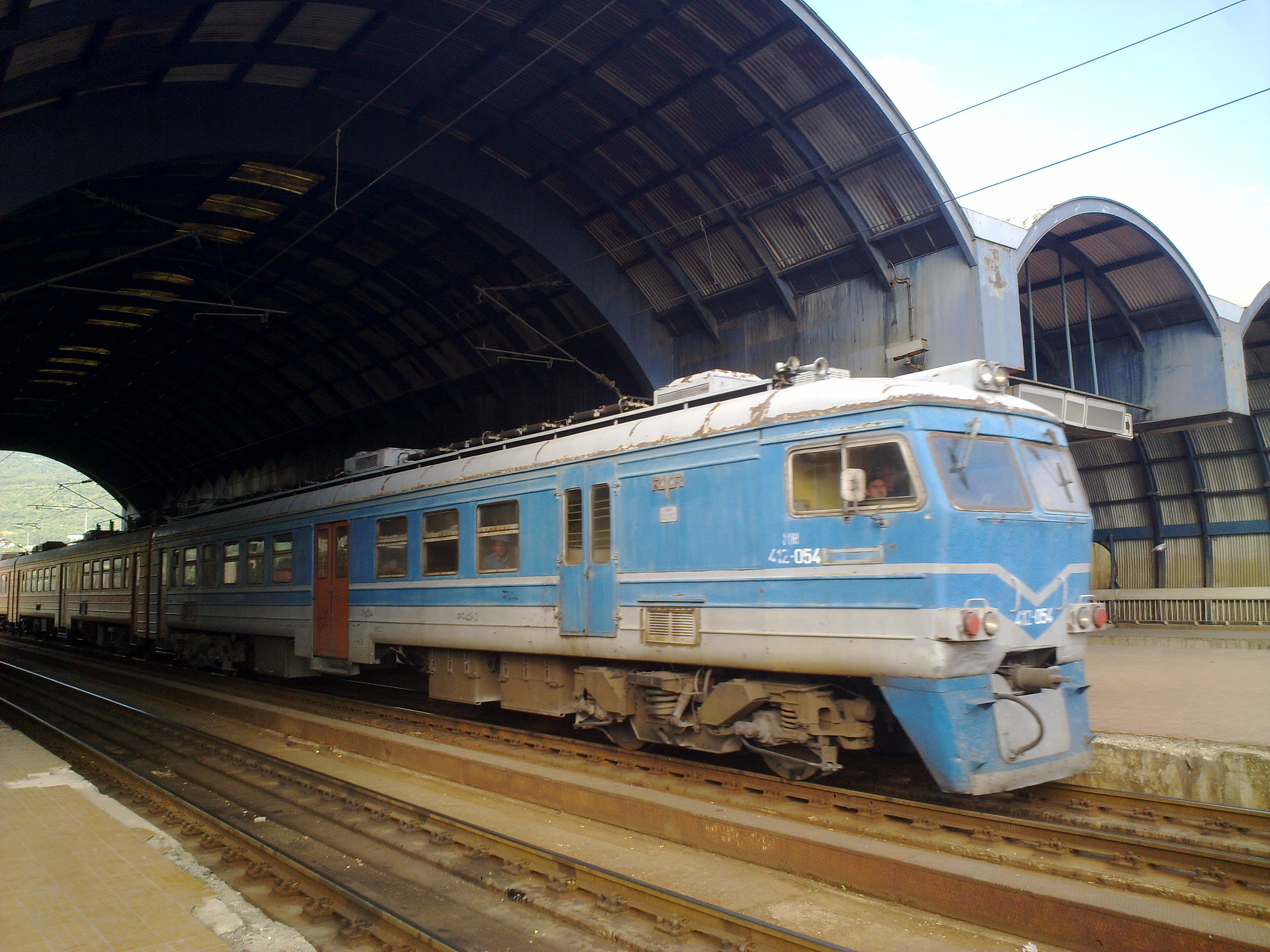
EMU MŽ 412 at Skopje train station, June 2011.

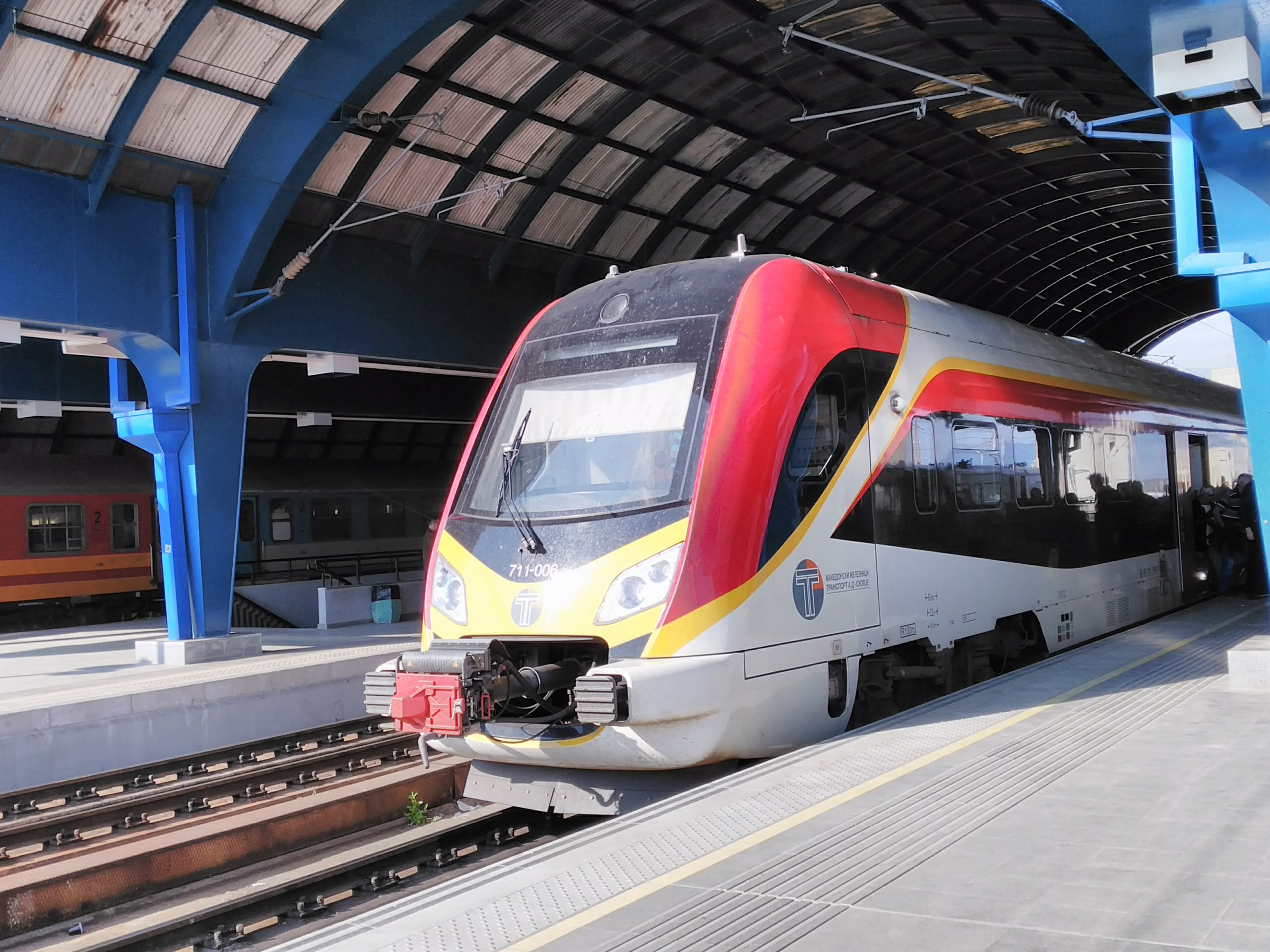
DMU MŽ 711 at Skopje train station, April 2017.
