= Gevgelija railway station =

Railway station in North Macedonia

Gevgelija railway station Железничка Станица Гевгелија
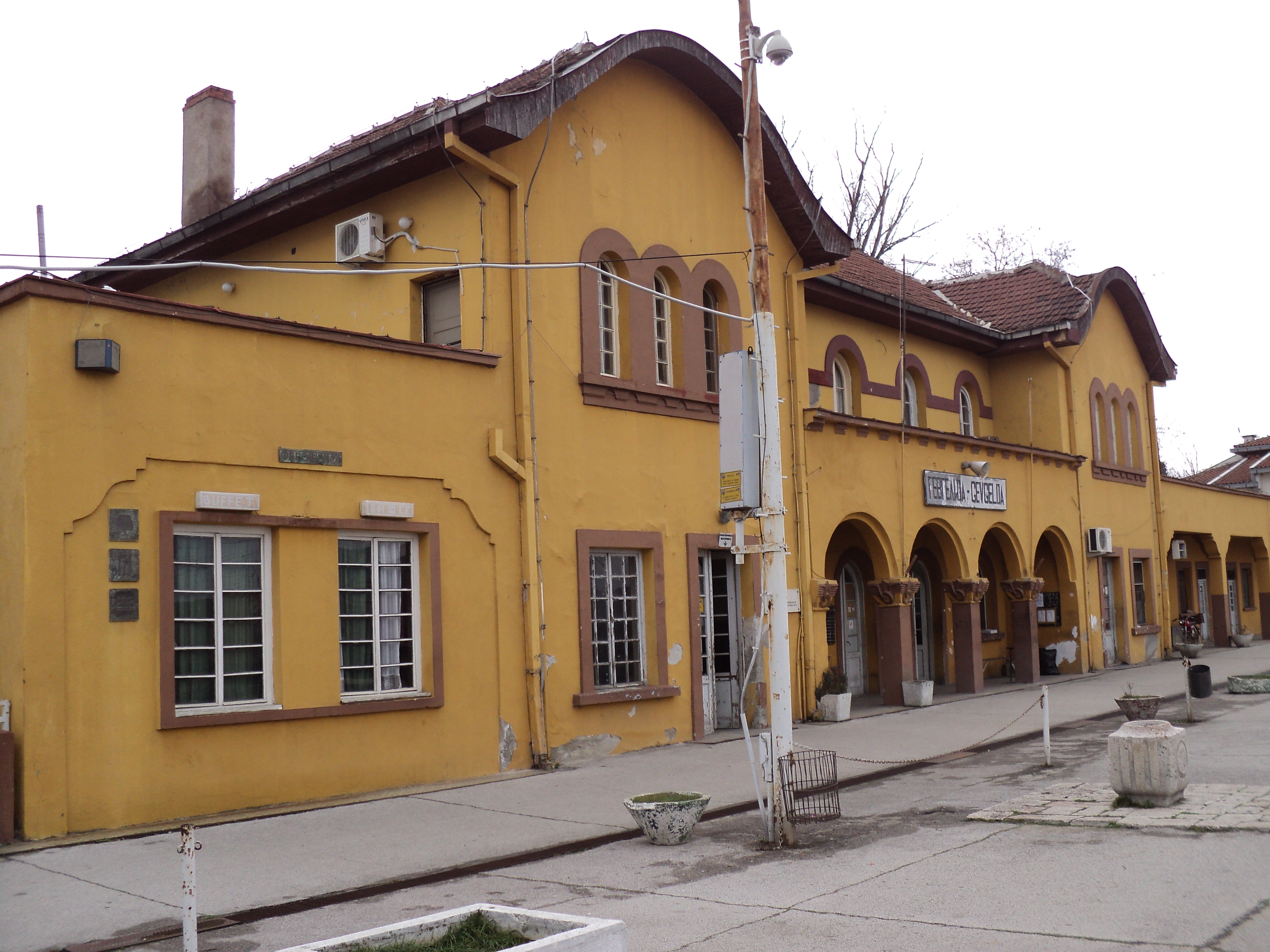
- View of the station buildings, January 2011

General information
- Location: Boris Kidrich 1, Gevgelija, North Macedonia
- Coordinates: 41.143723°N 22.5122362°E
- Owner: Makedonski Železnici
- Lines: Corridor VIII; Corridor X
- Tracks: 13 (10 in use)
- Train operators: Makedonski Železnici

Construction
- Structure type: at-grade
- Parking: yes

Other information
- Status: Staffed

History
- Opened: 1874

Services
Preceding station	Hellenic Train	Following station
Makedonski Železnici
Prdejci towards Belgrade	Hellas	Idomeni towards Thessaloniki
Location
- Location within North Macedonia

Gevgelija railway station (Железничка Станица Гевгелија) is the main railway station in Gevgelija, North Macedonia. It is on the eastern edge of the city and is served by international intercity trains to Thessaloniki, Skopje, and Belgrade.

== History ==
The station was built in 1873 when Chemins de fer Orientaux opened the line from Skopje to Thessaloniki, both at the time part of Ottoman Empire. Following the Treaty of London that ended the First Balkan War on 30 May 1913, Gevgelija was annexed and incorporated into the Kingdom of Serbia, as one of the kingdom's southernmost settlements, and the station was integrated into the Serbian railways. In 1929, the railways along with the country were renamed, now known as Yugoslav State Railways (JDŽ). In April 1941 the railway ceased to exist when Yugoslavia was annexed by the Axis powers. Despite having joined the Axis Powers, the Bulgarian military did not participate in the invasion of Yugoslavia, however, were ready to occupy their pre-arranged territorial gains immediately after the capitulation of the country. The Yugoslav government surrendered on 17 April; on 19 April, the Bulgarian Land Forces entered Yugoslavia. After Yugoslavia's capitulation, Bulgaria occupied most of Yugoslav Macedonia, which had been lost to Bulgaria in 1918. The railways in these regions were incorporated into the Bulgarian State Railways and repurposed to serve the war effect. Following Bulgaria's surrender, Gevgelija was returned to Yugoslavia. The railway was reestablished after World War II. In 1952 it was renamed Yugoslav Railways. In September 1991, an independence referendum was held in then Socialist Republic of Macedonia, which afterwards proclaimed independence from SFR Yugoslavia to become Republic of Macedonia. With that, Gevgelija and all rail infrastructure and assets were transferred from Yugoslav Railways to Makedonski Železnici (MŽ). In 2020, the station was one of ten regional stations to be allocated funds for renovation work. The waiting room, the ticket office, the toilets, and the other rooms within the station building were renovated, with the facade of the building being declared a cultural monument is being repaired and renovated.

== Facilities ==
The station has a ticket office, toilets and cafe. As the last station in North Macedonia for services to Greece, it has a border and customs post. At platform level, the station is equipped with departure and arrival screens on the platforms for passenger information, seating, and information boards. Currently, no buses call at the station. There is, however, onsite parking available at the station.

== Services ==
The station is serviced by a number of local, long-distance, and international services. In April 2021 new timetables were announced, with trains leaving Gevgelija for Skopje at 05:30 and at 16:00

== Migrant crisis ==
12 April 2018 at 18.05 a mixed patrol team of customs officers and a representative of the Macedonian Railways Gevgelija regional unit performed a control inspection of two wagons of a freight train that had arrived from Greece. There they reported four migrants from Afghanistan and Iran caught hiding aboard the train.
