= Zidani Most =

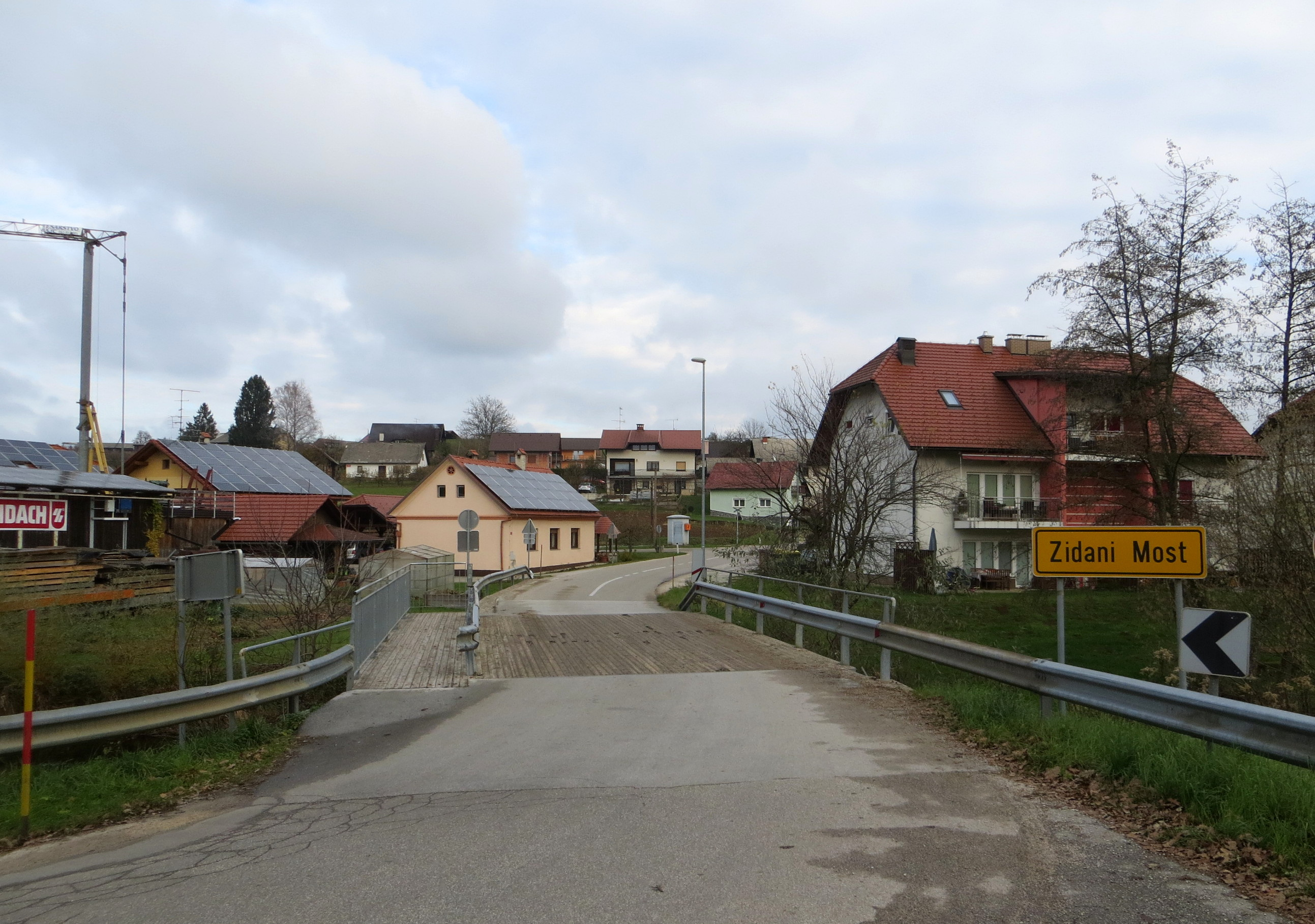
- Interactive map of Zidani Most
- Location in Slovenia
- Coordinates: 46°5′16″N 15°10′25″E
- Country: Slovenia
- Traditional region: Styria
- Statistical region: Savinja
- Municipality: Laško

Area
  - Total: 0.76 km^{2} (0.29 sq mi)
- Elevation: 204.5 m (671 ft)

Population (2011)
  - Total: 284
  - Density: 372/km^{2} (960/sq mi)
- Website: www.zidanimost.si

Zidani Most (pronounced [ˈziːdani ˈmoːst]; German: Steinbrück) is a settlement in the Municipality of Laško in eastern Slovenia. It lies at the confluence of the Sava and Savinja rivers. The area is part of the traditional region of Styria. It is now included with the rest of the municipality in the Savinja Statistical Region. It is an important railway station and junction.

== Name ==
The name Zidani Most literally means 'stone bridge'. The settlement was attested in 1224 as Lapideo Ponti (and as trans Pontem in 1230, bey der Gemauertten Prucken in 1457–1461, and an der Stainen Prukken in 1470). The name refers to a stone bridge built at the site in 1224 by Leopold VI. The bridge was destroyed in battles between Emperor Frederick III and the Counts of Celje in 1442.

== Main sights ==
=== Bridges ===
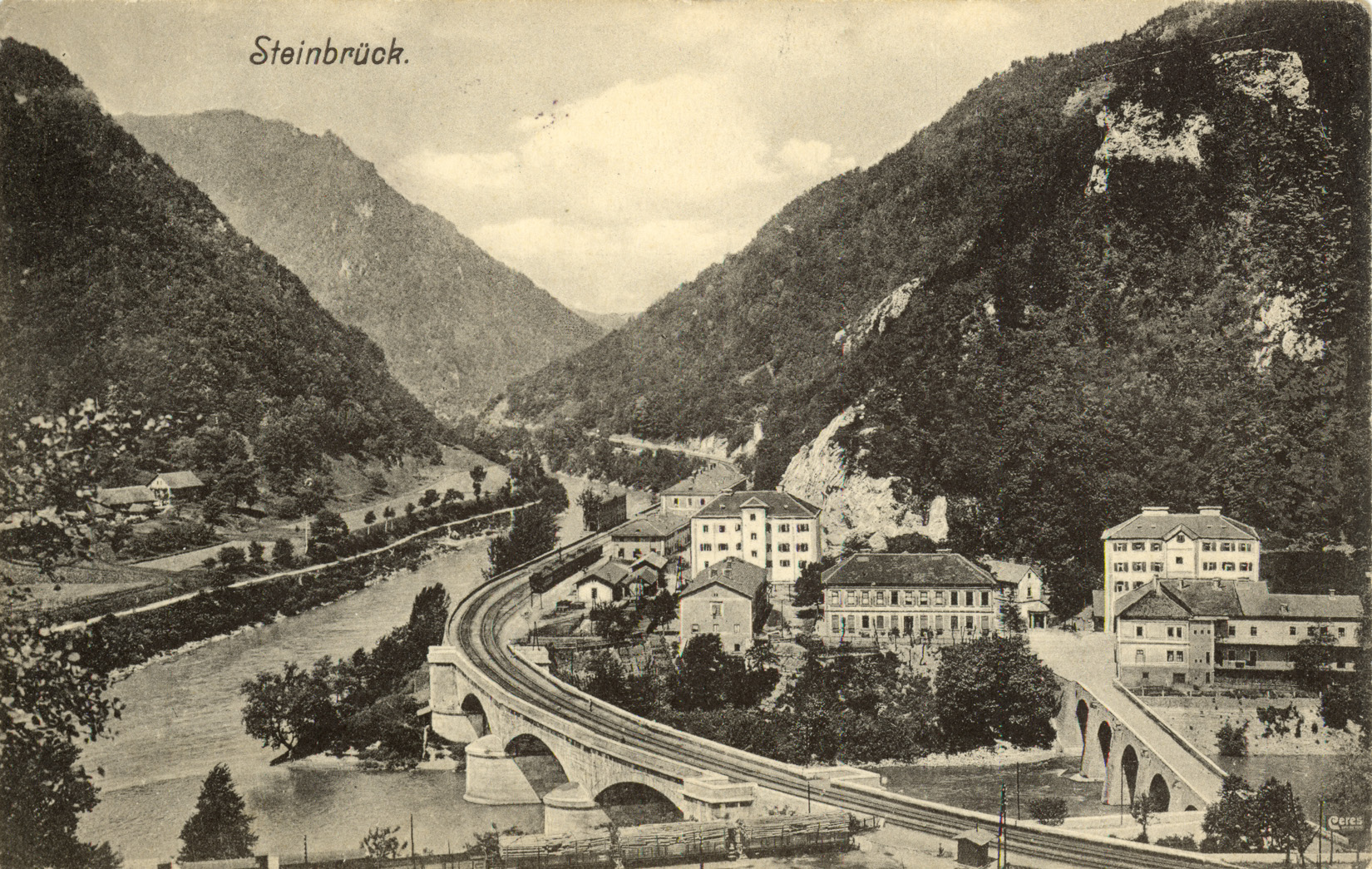
1914 panorama of Zidani Most before the construction of the new railroad bridge. The Savinja flows to Zidani Most from the north (right). The Sava flows from the west (back).

A bridge already crossed the Sava in the area in 20 BC, in the Roman period, linking the towns of Emona, Celeia, and Neviodunum. The current road stone bridge over the Savinja was built by order of Archduke John of Austria in 1824–26 following plans by the engineer Friedrich Byloff and linked the town of Celje and the Lower Sava Valley. The old railroad bridge that still stands was built in 1846–49 from 1,260 stone blocks to the plans of the engineer Eduard Heider. Its construction was technically very demanding, because it had to follow a curve. Similarly technically demanding was the construction of the new reinforced concrete railroad bridge, built by the Slavec company from Kranj in 1929–30.

=== Church ===
The local church, built in the eastern part of the settlement known as Vila, is dedicated to the Sacred Heart of Jesus and belongs to the Parish of Marija Širje. It was built in 1920.

=== Transportation ===
Zidani Most is connected by rail with the Zidani Most railway station.

== See also ==
- Zidani Most railway station
