= UIC passenger coach types =

Standardised passenger coaches

The UIC type X, Y and Z coaches are passenger coaches for international railway services that have been standardised in certain respects by the International Union of Railways (Union internationale des chemins de fer or UIC).

In 1961, types X and Y were defined in UIC Leaflet 567, the type Z followed subsequently. This standardisation was intended to give rail passengers on international services a standard level of comfort; in addition it was intended to simplify the maintenance of coaches when abroad. One of the standards introduced was the use of rubber corridor connectors on gangways instead of bellows.

== UIC type X ==
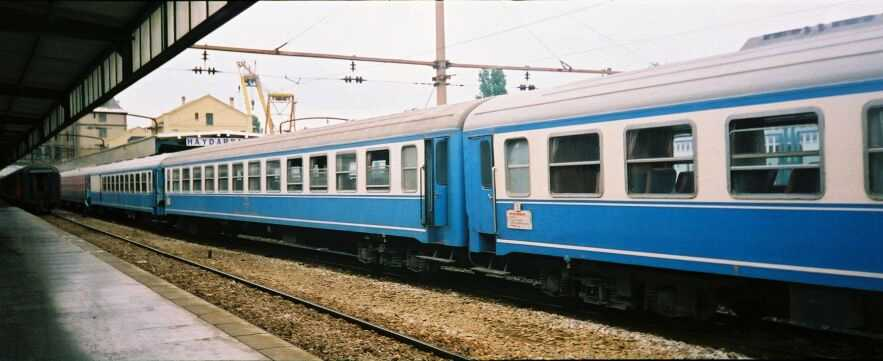
TCDD UIC-X coaches at Haydarpaşa railway station in 2001

The UIC type X was based on the express coaches developed after the Second World War by the Deutsche Bundesbahn (DB). These coaches were 26.4 m (86 ft 7 in) long and had doors at each end as well as compartments opening off a corridor as follows:

- Twelve compartments each with six seats in second class
- Ten compartments each with six seats in first class

Composite coaches usually had six second class compartments and five first class compartments Type X coaches went into service in many countries, the largest numbers being deployed by the DB and the Italian state railways.

== UIC type Y ==
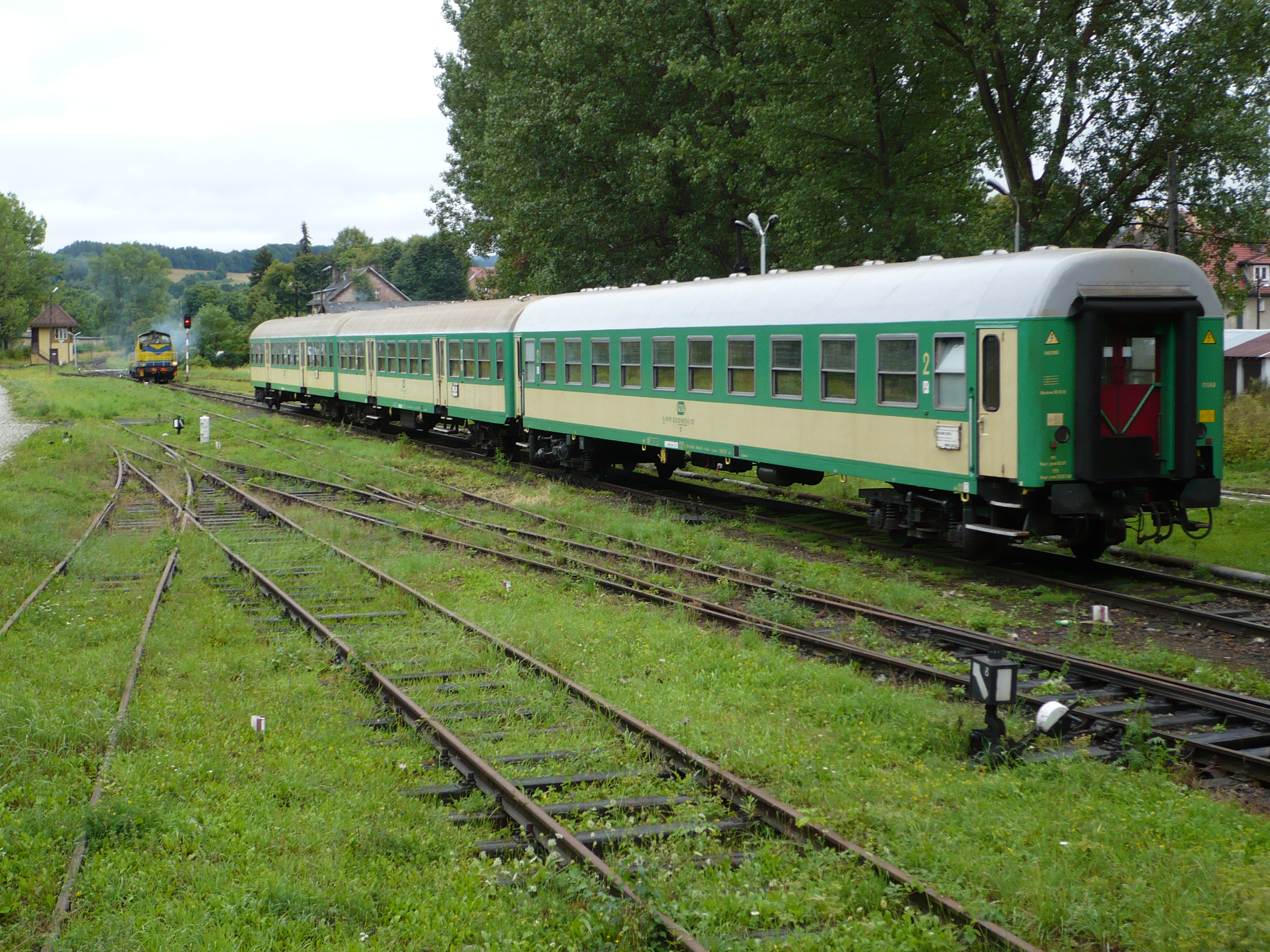
Unrefurbished PKP Class 111A carriages of UIC-Y standard at Kudowa-Zdrój, August 2008

The UIC type Y was based on French proposals for an international express coach (Schnellzugwagen). Important differences from the type X were its shorter length and greater number of seats in second class compartments. The coaches were 24.5 m (80 ft 5 in) long, the doors were also at the ends and a corridor coach configuration was standard:

- Ten compartments of eight seats in second class
- Nine compartments of six seats in first class

The French state railway, SNCF, had composite coaches, sleepers, dining cars and coaches with a luggage section built as part of the same series.

The Danish national railway, the DSB, operated three main types of coaches based on the type Y, the first class A (a total of 25 coaches), second class B (291 coaches) and the mixed class AB (20 coaches), from 1966 till they were replaced by modern train sets. Later also sleeper coaches almost identical was added, and for the regional traffic the classes BN and A, and later also coaches with a control cabin. There were two primary reasons for choosing the type Y, the first being that according to international standards it could be slightly wider and therefore more comfortable, the other equally important that this length provided for optimal usage of the available track length of the Great Belt ferries.

== UIC type Z ==
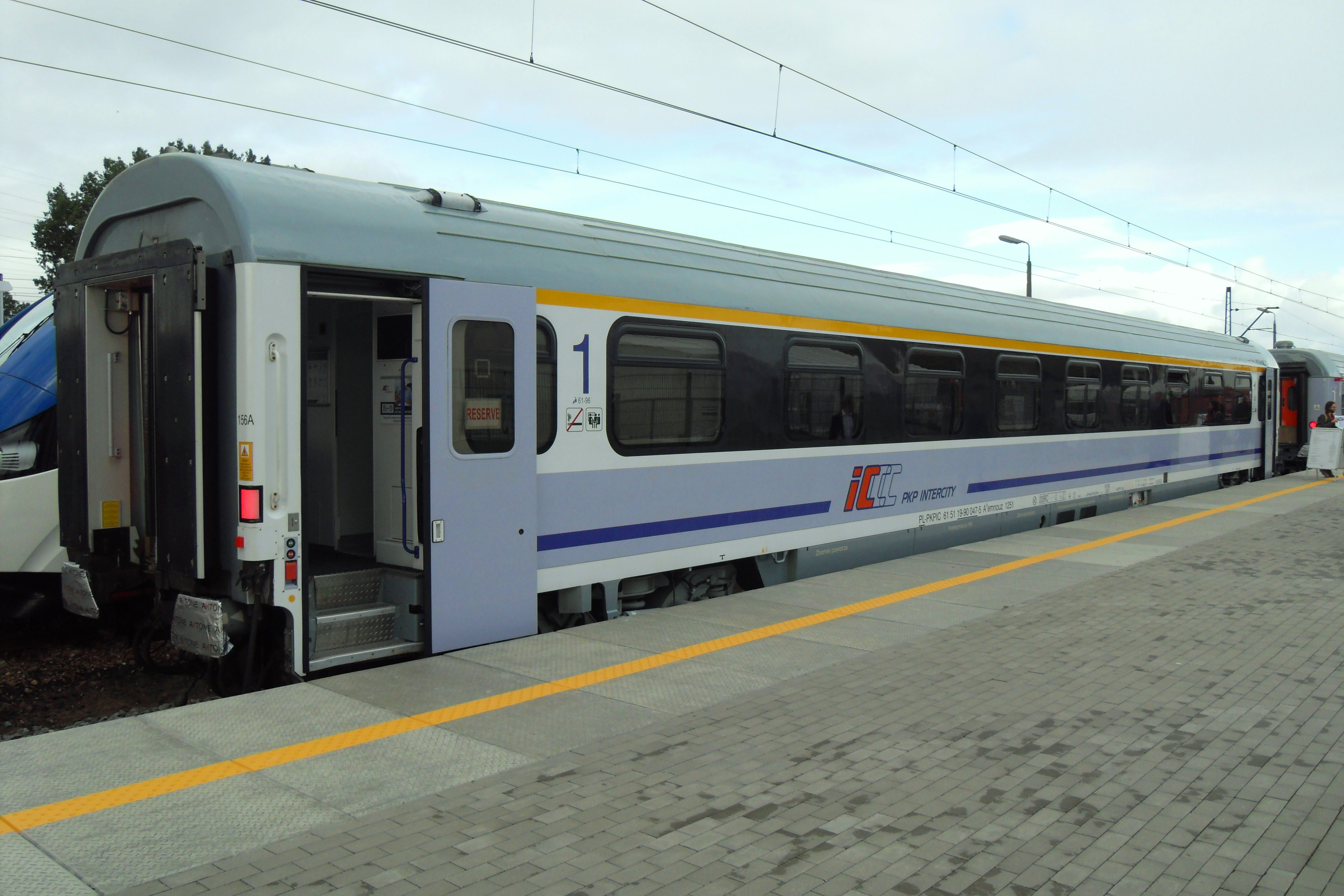
PKP Intercity Class 156A passenger carriage of UIC-Z1 standard at TRAKO International Railway Fair, September 2013

With the development of Eurofima coaches a new level of comfort was achieved; the number of compartments was reduced whilst keeping to the same overall length, the coaches were also air-conditioned. These coaches were designated from 1976 as type Z. But because various railways still did not want to procure air-conditioned coaches or wanted to reduce the number of compartments compared with the type X (the SBB on all its acquisitions since 1969), the class was eventually divided into Z1 and Z2:

- Z1 = air-conditioned coaches with a reduced number of compartments
- Z2 = non air-conditioned coach with a reduced number of compartments

namely:

- Eleven compartments of six seats in second class
- Nine compartments of six seats in first class

Composite coaches usually had six second class compartments and four first class compartments.

On the Eurofima coach the exits were changed from the folding doors characteristic of type X and Y to pneumatically operated swinging-sliding doors.

== See also ==
- Union Internationale des Chemins de Fer
- UIC classification of locomotive axle arrangements
- UIC classification of railway coaches
- UIC classification of goods wagons
- UIC country codes

== Sources ==
- Alain Rambaud, Jean-Marc Dupuy: Encyclopédie des voitures SNCF. La vie du rail, Paris 1990. ISBN 2-902808-31-3
