= UIC wagon numbers =

Railway vehicle and coach number system

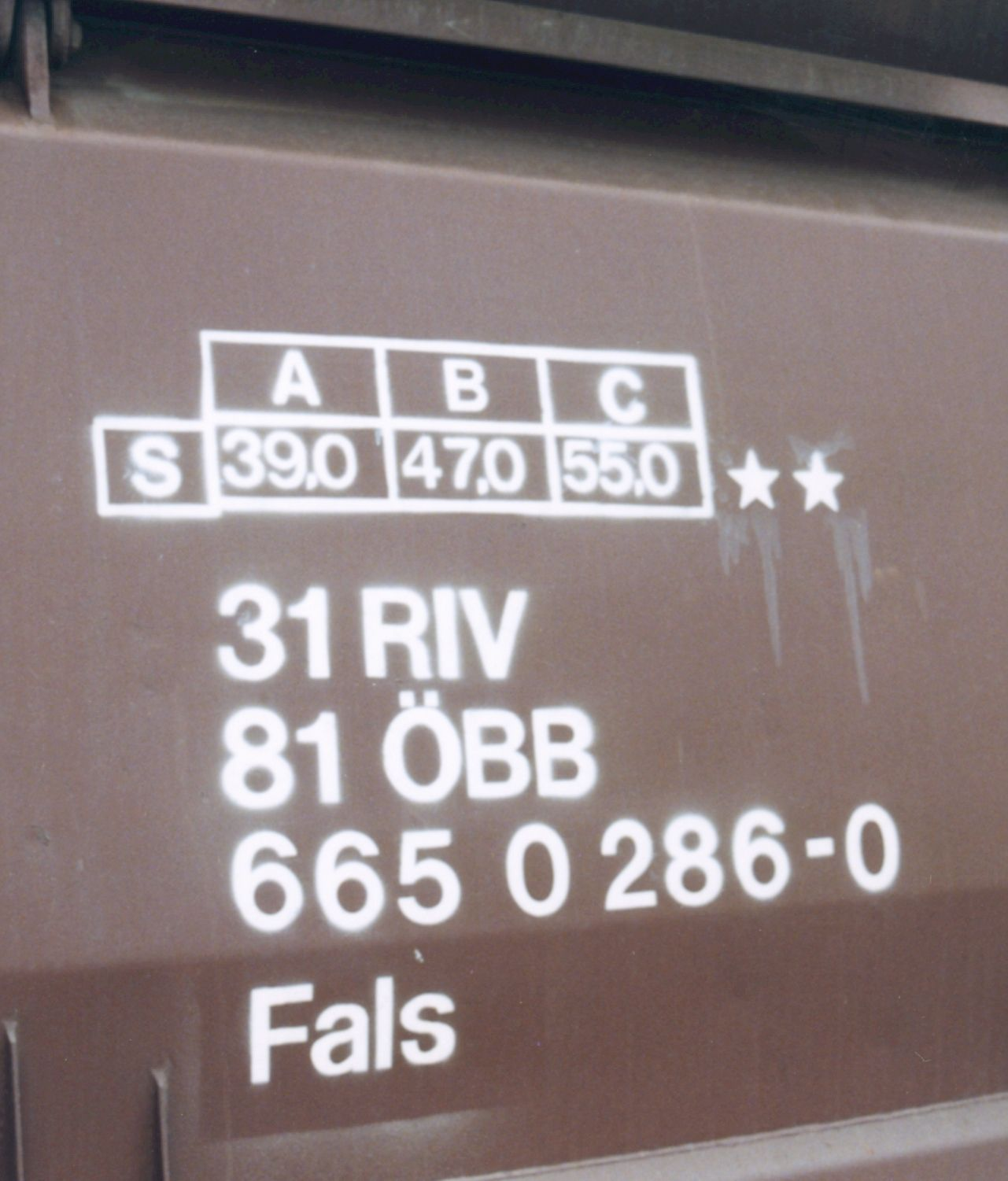
Wagon number, 81 stands for Austria

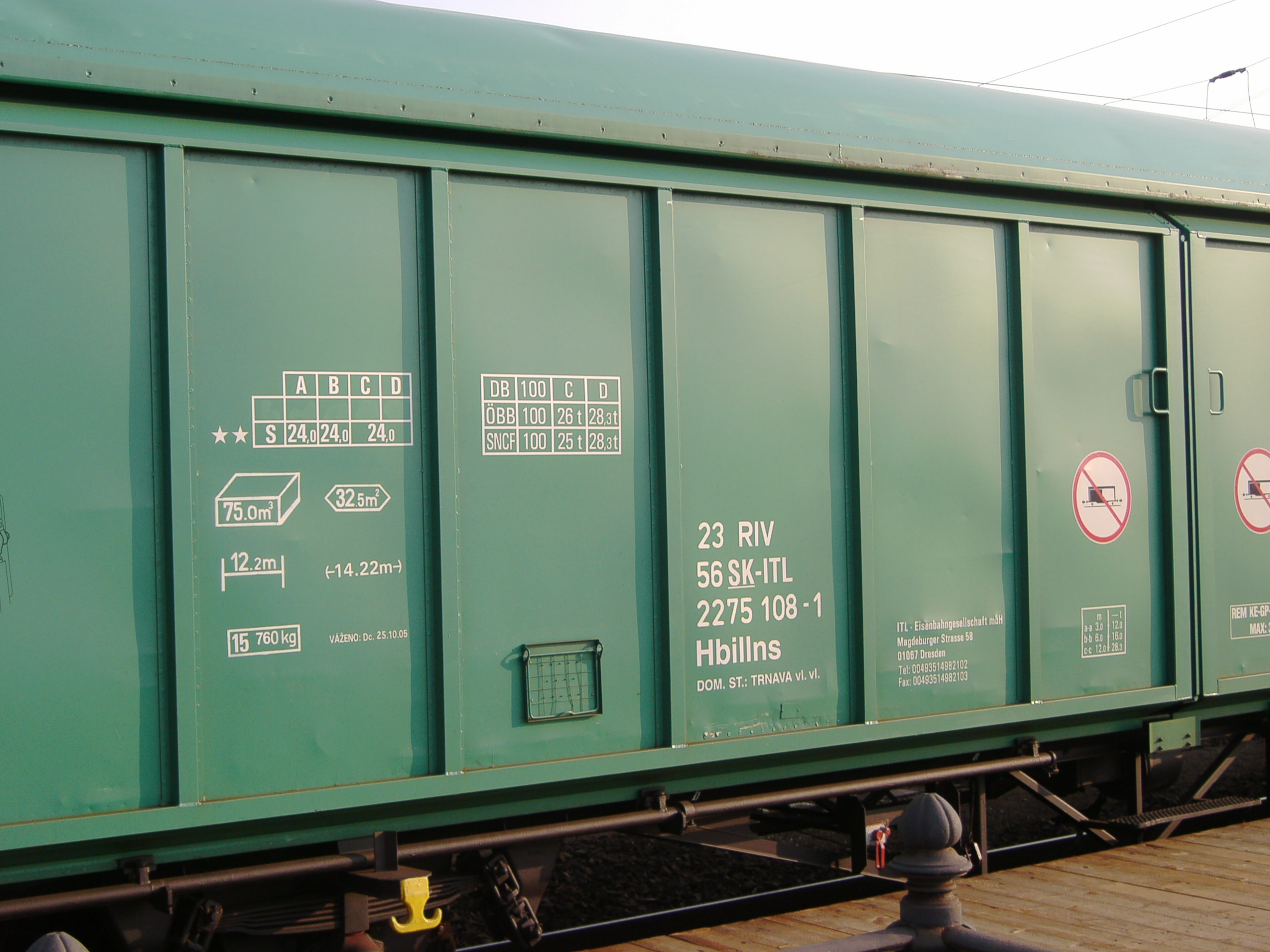
This ITL Hbbillns goods wagon with country code 56 is based in Slovakia

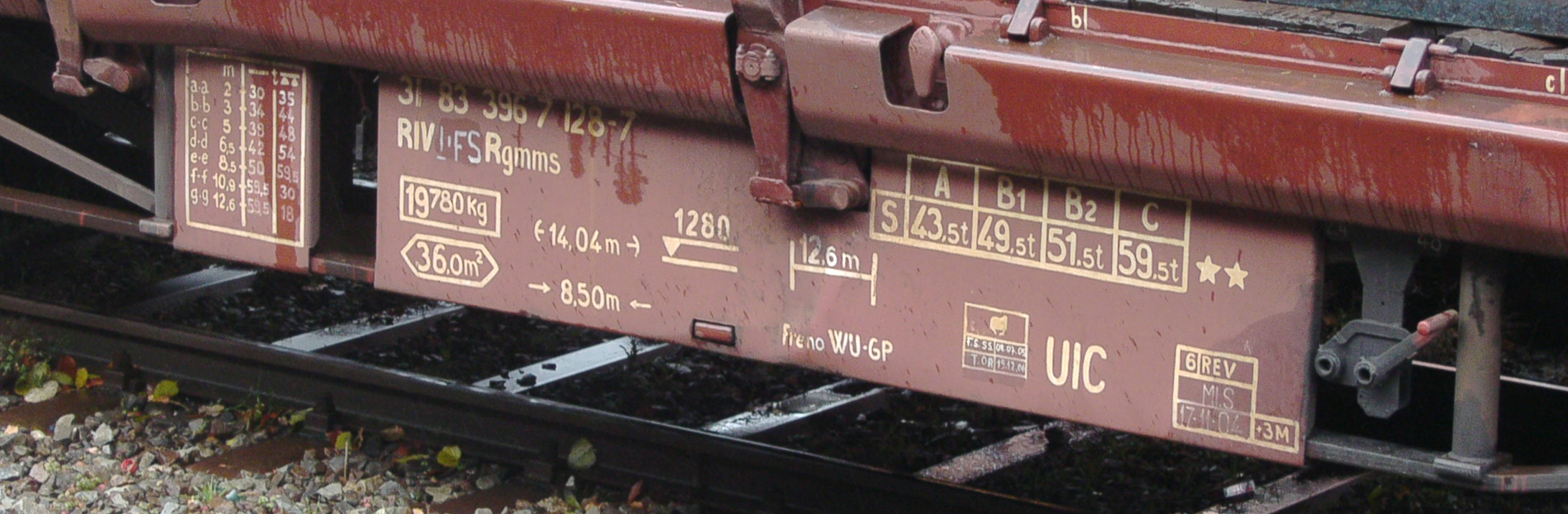
Wagon number of an Italian Rgmms flat wagon

Wagon numbers (or coach numbers) are key data for railway operations. They enable a railway wagon or coach to be positively identified and form a common language between railway operators, infrastructure companies and the state authorities. The system of wagon numbering has been laid down by the International Union of Railways (Union internationale des chemins de fer or UIC, founded in 1922) and is similar to that used for the locomotives and multiple units. Vehicle numbering is now governed by the Intergovernmental Organisation for International Carriage by Rail and in Technical Specifications for Interoperability (TSI) of the European Union.

The complete wagon number comprises 12 digits. The individual digits have the following meaning:

Digits 1-2:	Type of vehicle and indication of the interoperability capacity (on multiple units, type)
Digits 3-4:	Country code (owner before 2006)
Digits 5-8:	Vehicle type
Digits 9-11:	Individual running number (serial number)
Digit 12:	Self-check digit

== Placement of the code ==
As shown on the photographs at right, the code may be arranged either vertically (e.g. on closed wagons) on three or more lines at man's height with the letter codes next to the corresponding part of the digit code, or horizontally (e.g. on flat wagons) at the bottom of the chassis side with all digits together (with groups separated by spaces and the check digit by a dash) and all letters together. It is always found on both sides of the wagon, not on the front or back.

== Calculation of the self-check digit ==
The digits are multiplied individually from right to left alternately by 2 and 1, and digit summed using the Luhn algorithm. The difference between this sum and the next multiple of ten is the check digit, placed after the eleventh digit, separated by a dash.

=== Examples ===
Wagon number: 21 81 2471 217

 2  1    8  1    2  4  7  1    2  1  7
             multiplying by 
 2  1    2  1    2  1  2  1    2  1  2
                 gives
 4  1   16  1    4  4 14  1    4  1 14
               digit sum
 4  1    7  1    4  4  5  1    4  1  5
                sum = 37
        next multiple of ten = 40
         check digit = 40-37 = 3
 2  1    8  1    2  4  7  1    2  1  7  -  3

Wagon number: 51 80 0843 001

 5  1    8  0    0  8  4  3    0  0  1
            multiplying by 
 2  1    2  1    2  1  2  1    2  1  2
                 gives
10  1   16  0    0  8  8  3    0  0  2
               digit sum
 1  1    7  0    0  8  8  3    0  0  2
                sum = 30
        next multiple of ten = 30
         check digit = 30-30 = 0
 5  1    8  0    0  8  4  3    0  0  1  -  0

== Country code ==
At the beginning of 2006 the country replaced the owner (almost exclusively state railways), with the owner now indicated by following letters. For example, for a vehicle registered in Germany on the AAE, which had its own code as a private railway, 68 AAE became 80 D-AAE. (see also UIC country code)

== Numbering systems ==
The UIC has the following numbering systems, as detailed in leaflets:

- Leaflet 419-2 – Analytical numbering of international freight trains.
- Leaflet 428-1 – International sorting system for wagonload traffic.
- Leaflet 438-2 – Identification marking for freight rolling stock.
- Leaflet 920-1 – Standard numerical coding for railway undertakings, infrastructure managers and others companies involved in rail-transport chains.
- Leaflet 920-2 – Standard numerical coding of locations.
- Leaflet 920-10 – Standard numerical code for railway customers.
- Leaflet 920-14 – Standard numerical country coding for use in railway traffic.

These agreements have not yet achieved the status of a standard or norm.

== See also ==
- DB locomotive classification
- UIC classification of goods wagons
- UIC classification of railway coaches
- UIC identification marking for tractive stock
- UIC passenger coach types
- UIC country codes
- Reporting marks, identifiers used on North American railroads
- ISO 6346, used for intermodal containers
