= Road number =

Road number may refer to:

- Route number of a road
- Running number of a locomotive
