= UIC classification of railway coaches =

International classification

Railway coaches are classified under an international system developed by the UIC. This UIC classification of railway coaches replaced earlier national classification schemes in many countries, such as Germany. The coach class is expressed as a combination of letters. It is sometimes followed, for example in the Deutsche Bahn AG, by a three-figure class number. In a broader sense the vehicle number displayed on the coach is also part of its classification, because it encodes other technical details such as the top speed or the type of heating system used.

For example the full designation of a passenger coach, including its coach number, looks like this:

73 80 29-94 708-7 Bpmbz 293.6

This article explains how this classification code on the sole bar of each coach may be decoded.

== Main letters ==
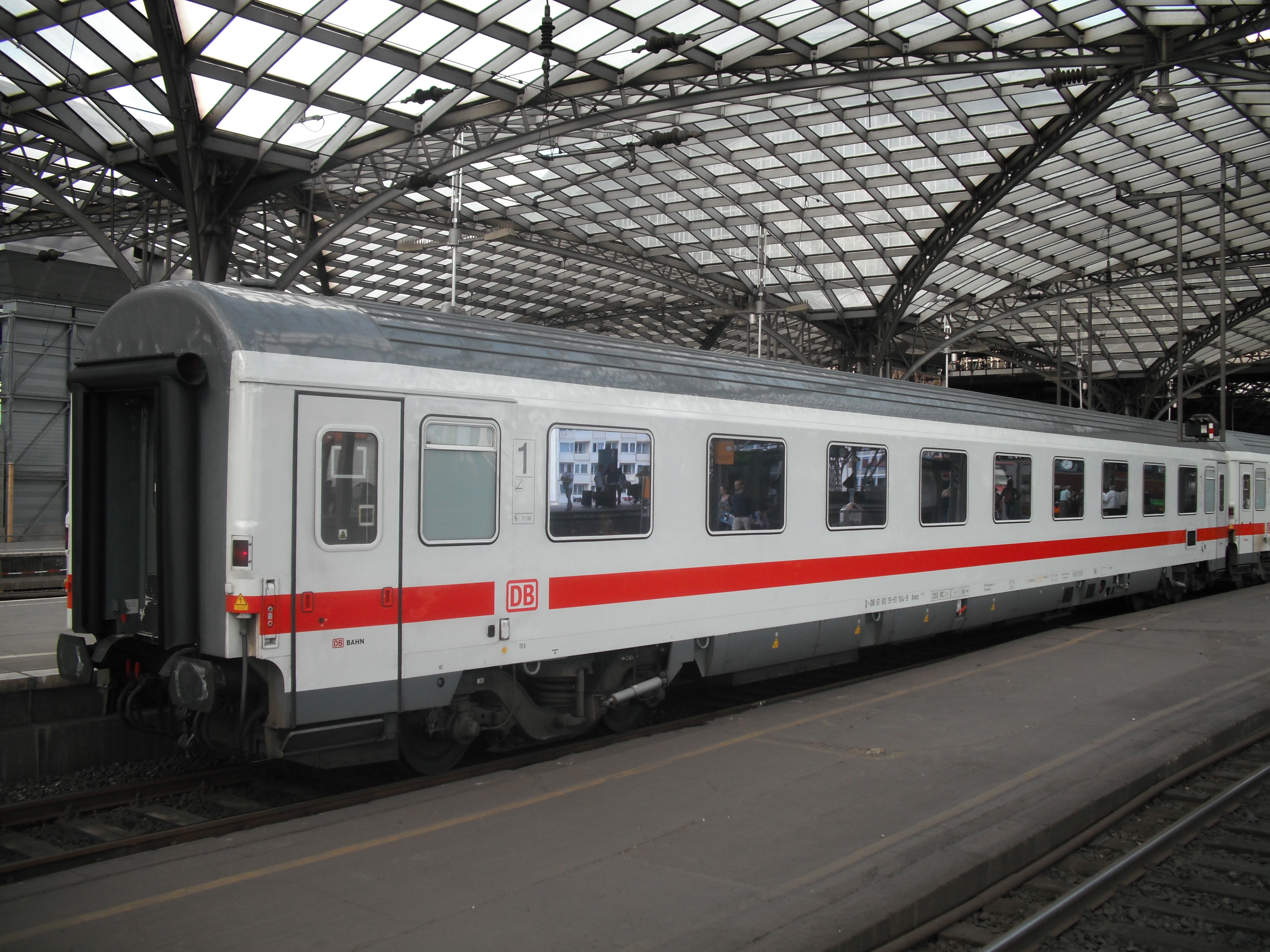
Avmz - 1st class compartment coach

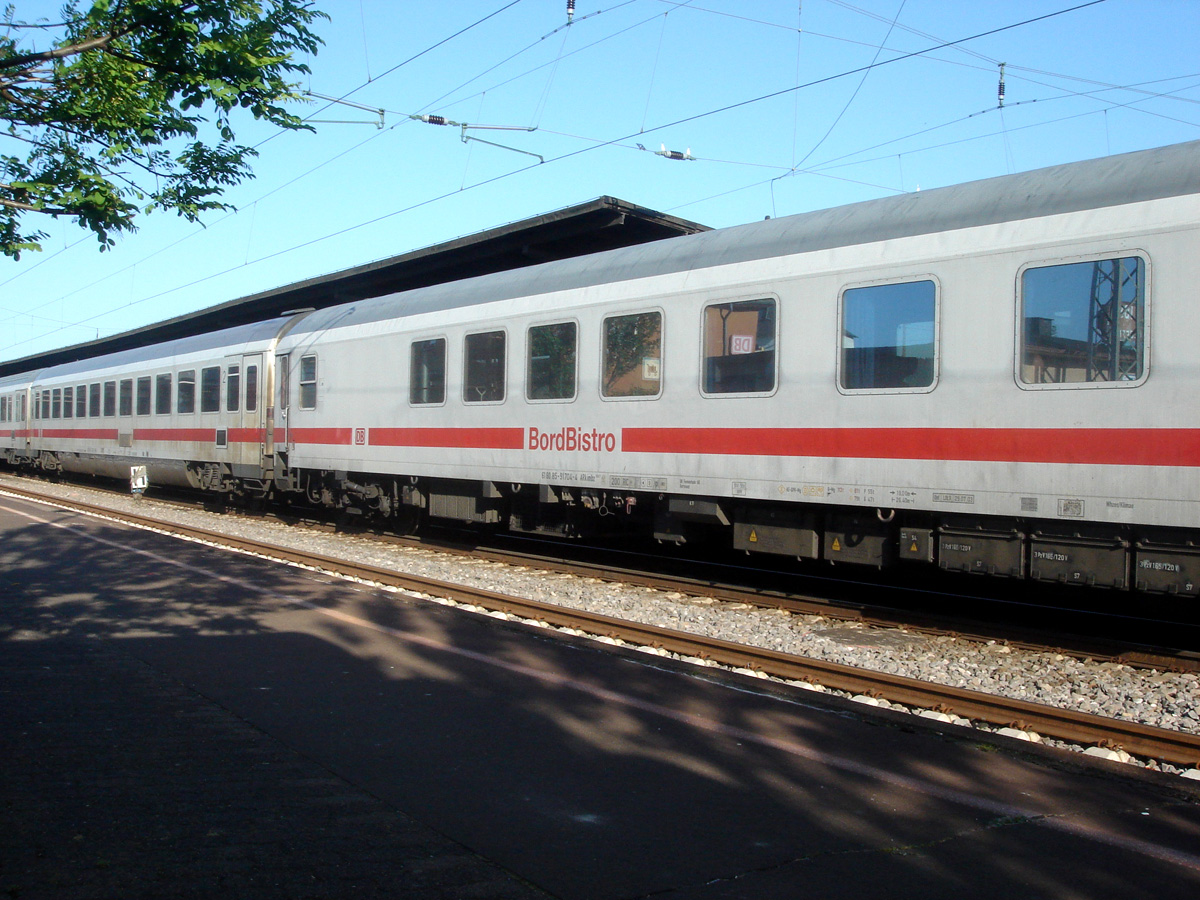
ARkimbz - Bistro Cafe/1st Class ex-InterRegio coach

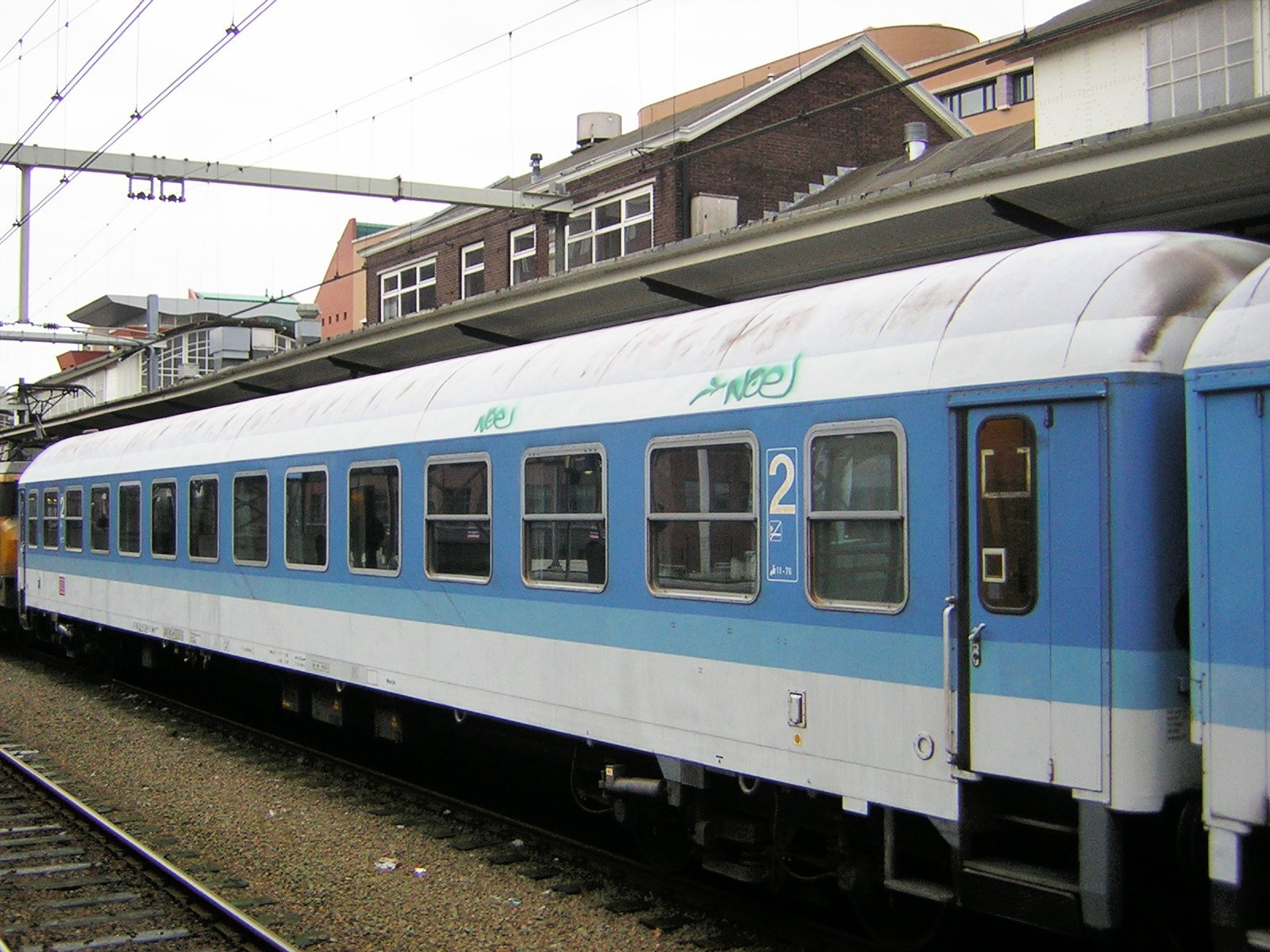
Bimz - 2nd class InterRegio coach

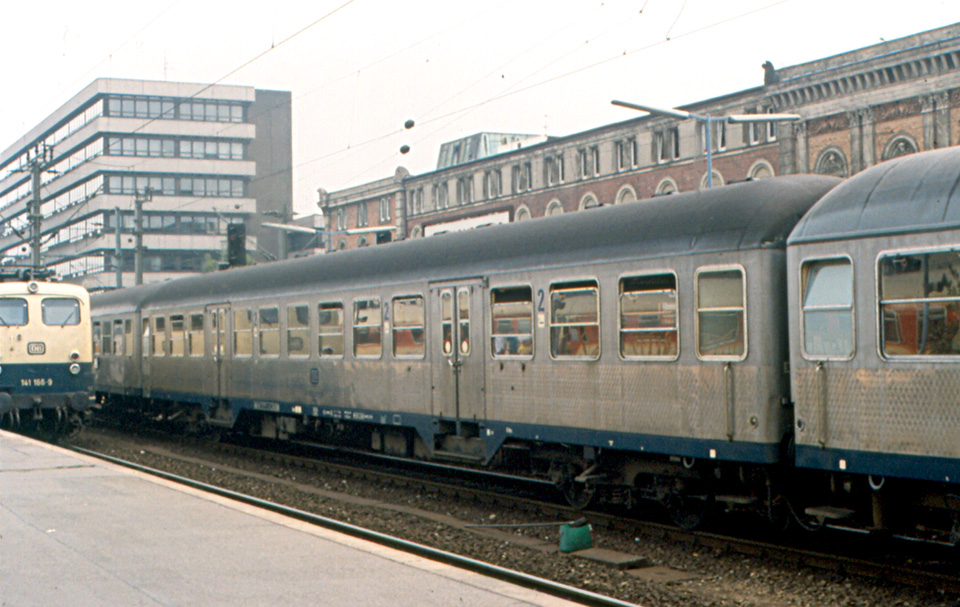
Bnrz - 2nd class local coach

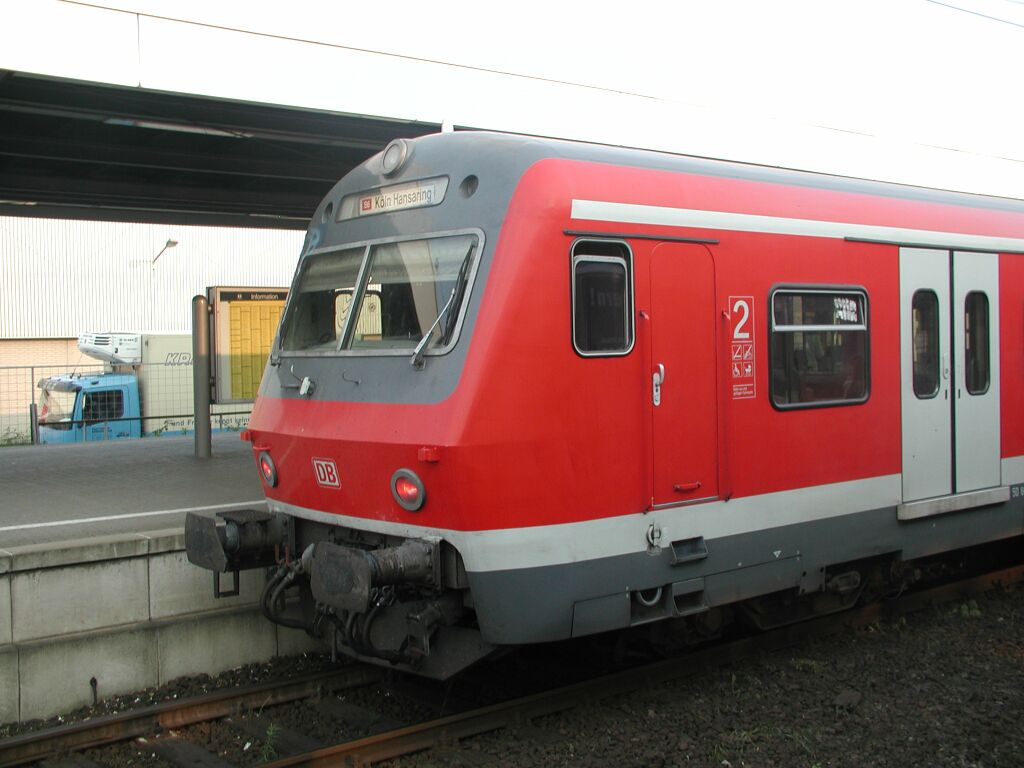
Bxf - 2nd class S-Bahn driving trailer

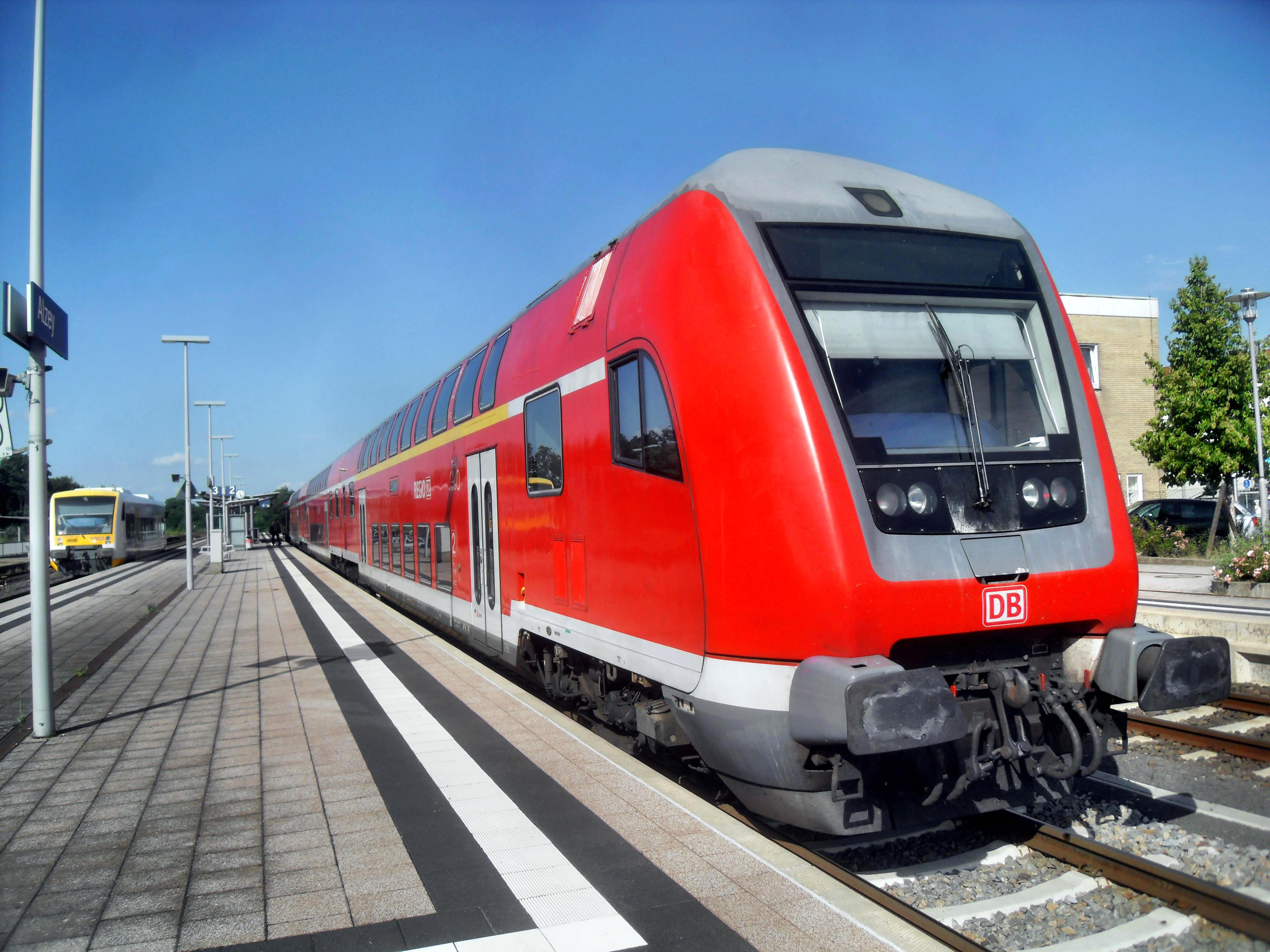
DABpzf - Double decker driving trailer with 1st and 2nd class (open) seating

The classification of a coach begins with one or more class letters, in our example above, a capital B. It describes the general class of coach:

A	Passenger coach with 1st class seating
B	Passenger coach with 2nd class seating
AB	Composite coach with 1st and 2nd class seating
AR	Coach with 1st class seating, kitchen and dining area
BC	Coach with 2nd class seating and place for disabled, and could also include playroom for children	(Norway only)
BF	Coach with place for small children, place for disabled, staff room and bicycle room	(Norway only)
BR	Coach with 2nd class seating, kitchen and dining area
AD, BD	Composite coach with 1st or 2nd class seating and a luggage compartment
D	Luggage van
DA, DB	Double-decker coach (Doppelstockwagen) with 1st or 2nd class seating	(Germany only)
DAB	Composite double-decker coach with 1st and 2nd class	(Germany only)
DD	Double-decker luggage van	(DR only)
DD	Double-decker car transporter of the passenger coach type	(used in motorail trains)
Post	Mail van	(Germany only)
F	Luggage van	(Norway and Sweden only)
F	Mail van	(Austria only)
FR	Coach with restaurant / bistro and staff room / luggage room	(Norway only)
BPost	Composite coach with 2nd class and a mail section
DPost	Luggage van with a mail section
WG	Club car	(Germany only)
WGS	Special club car (Saloon car)	(Germany only)
SR	Club car
Salon	Saloon coach
WR	Restaurant car
WL…	Sleeper	(in most countries in combination with A or B)
K…	Narrow gauge coach	(only in combination with A, B or D)
Z	Mail van	(Switzerland only)
Z	Prisoner transporter	(DR only)

== Secondary letters (Deutsche Bahn) ==
The following lower-case letters follow the main letters and describe the technical equipment and fittings of the coach. How the letters are used, is at least partly up to the individual railway company. This overview is based on the system used by Deutsche Bahn:

i
formerly: local- or regional-traffic passenger (Nah- oder Regionalverkehrswagen) coach with center aisle, gangway without rubber connectors
formerly: InterRegio coach
l
regional-traffic passenger coach (Regionalverkehrswagen) with length of more than 24.5 metres, centre aisle in 2nd class, centre aisle or side corridor in 1st class, rubber gangway connectors (currently not used)
formerly: couchette coach (Liegewagen), later changed to c
m
long-distance passenger coach (Fernverkehrswagen) with length of more than 24.5 metres, rubber gangway connectors (except on DDm)
mm
long-distance modified passenger coach (Fernverkehrswagen) with length of more than 24.5 metres, rubber gangway connectors
n
local-traffic passenger coach (Nahverkehrswagen) with length of more than 24.5 metres, centre aisle in 2nd class, centre aisle or side corridor in 1st class, two centre doors, with 36-pole control cable for push-pull operations
x
local-traffic passenger coach (S-Bahn) with centre aisle, centre doors, high performance brakes, bus bar for current collection, push-pull operations by default
y
regional-traffic passenger coach (Regionalverkehrswagen) with length of more than 24.5 m, centre aisle in 2nd class, centre aisle or side corridor in 1st class, two centre doors, with 34-pole control cable for push-pull operations
b
coach with equipment for the disabled (behindertengerecht)
formerly: coach with command-control cabling (Befehls-Leitung)
c
couchette coach, compartment seats can be converted to couchettes
d
coach with luggage, multi-purpose or bicycle section
k
coach with bistro, kiosk, kitchen section or snack machines
o
compartment coach with fewer number, without (ohne) air-conditioning
p
open coach with centre aisle (pullman type), air-conditioned
s
on luggage vans: side corridor (Seitengang)
on sleepers: Special type (small single- or twin-bed compartments)
on compartment coaches: Service compartment
v
compartment coach with fewer (verringerter) number (11 instead of 12 on Bm, 9 instead of 10 on Am, 6/4 instead of 6/5 on ABm), air-conditioned
w
compartment coach with way fewer number (9 instead of 12 Bm, former Am)
formerly: seats with padding (weich) also in former third class and then new second class
r
coach with high-performance brakes (Rapid-Bremse) KE-GPR (only with n or Post)
f
coach with driving cab (Führerstand), 36-pole control cabling or time-division multiplexed push-pull operations
q
coach with driving cab, 34-pole control cabling for push-pull operations (only non-modernised vehicles without n or y)
u
coach with 34-pole control cable for push-pull operations
uu
coach with 36-pole control cable for push-pull operations (included in f or n)
h
coach which power supply from axle generators (some with additional bus-bar)
formerly: non-converted local passenger train coaches of Reichsbahn origin
z
coach with power supply from bus-bar (no axle generators)
a
coach with automatic door operation (TAV)
e
formerly: coach with electrical heating

== Secondary letters (Austrian Federal Railways) ==
The Austrian Railways use different secondary letters for twin- and four-axled coaches. The following letters have been in force since 1981. The letters d for double-decker coach, l for push-pull coaches and s for driving cars are written after a dash (e.g.: Bmpz-ds).

c	Four-axled couchette coach
m	Four-axled coach longer than 24 m
p	Four-axled open coach with centre doors
s	on four-axled luggage van with corridor
x	on four-axled luggage van for express goods
z	Four-axled coach with power supply from a bus-bar
h	Twin-axled coach with electric heating
i	Twin-axled coach with open platforms and centre doors
ip	Twin-axled coach with enclosed platforms and centre doors
o	Twin-axled coach without steam heating
ü	Twin-axled coach with gangway bellows
w	Twin-axled coach with Webasto heating (driving trailer)
-d	Double-decker coach
-k	Coach with driving cab
-l	Coach with control cables for push-pull operation
-s	Driving trailer for push-pull operation

== Secondary letters (SNCF) ==
In addition to secondary letters, SNCF includes superscript characters to indicate the number of compartments or sections within a coach. (Example = A^{8}tuj)

c	Couchette car
d	Coach with luggage section
(e)	Bi-level coach
f	Coach compatible with the British loading gauge
h	Wheelchair accessible coach
j	Stainless steel (Inox) coach
o	Coach suitable for Hospital train use
(p)	Coach with gangway, but no bellows or rubber connectors
q	Non-metallic coach
r	Coach with Buffet or Restaurant section
s	Luggage van with side corridor
t	Open center aisle coach (Chair car)
u	Air-conditioned coach
w	Coach with immobilization brake
x	Coach with special compartment
z	Coach without screw brake (hand brake)

== Secondary letters (Swiss Federal Railways) ==
The Swiss Federal Railways currently uses secondary letters for their fleet of Eurofima coaches and to denote special type carriages.

c	Couchette car
m	Passenger coach with a length of more than 24 meters
p	Open center aisle coach (Chair car) or Panorama coach
r	Bar or Buffet coach (not currently in use)
s	Salon coach
t	Driving trailer

== Vehicle number ==
The fifth digit of the Coach number defines the type:

- 0 = private coach
- 1 = first class seating coach (A)
- 2 = second seating class coach (B)
- 3 = mixed classes seating coach (AB)
- 4 = first or mixed class couchette coach (Ac, ABc)
- 5 = second class couchette coach (Bc)
- 7 = sleeper coach (any class)

== See also ==
- UIC identification marking for tractive stock
- UIC classification of locomotive axle arrangements
- UIC passenger coach types
- UIC classification of goods wagons
- UIC country codes

== Sources ==
- Reisezugwagen-Gattungszeichen
