= Reporting mark =

Alphabetic code ID used on the North American railroad network

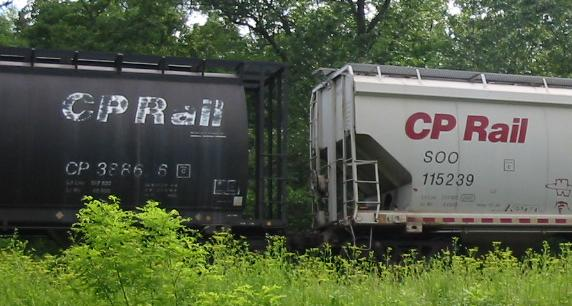
Reporting marks on two Canadian Pacific covered hopper cars; with the left car marked as CP 388686 and the right car marked as SOO 115239

A reporting mark is a code used to identify owners or lessees of rolling stock and other equipment used on certain rail transport networks. The code typically reflects the name or identifying number of the owner, lessee, or operator of the equipment, similar to IATA airline designators.

In North America, the mark, which consists of an alphabetic code of two to four letters, is stenciled on each piece of equipment, along with a one- to six-digit number. This information is used to uniquely identify every such rail car or locomotive, thus allowing it to be tracked by the railroad it is traveling over, which shares the information with other railroads and customers. In multinational registries, a code indicating the home country may also be included.

== Standard practices ==
=== North America ===
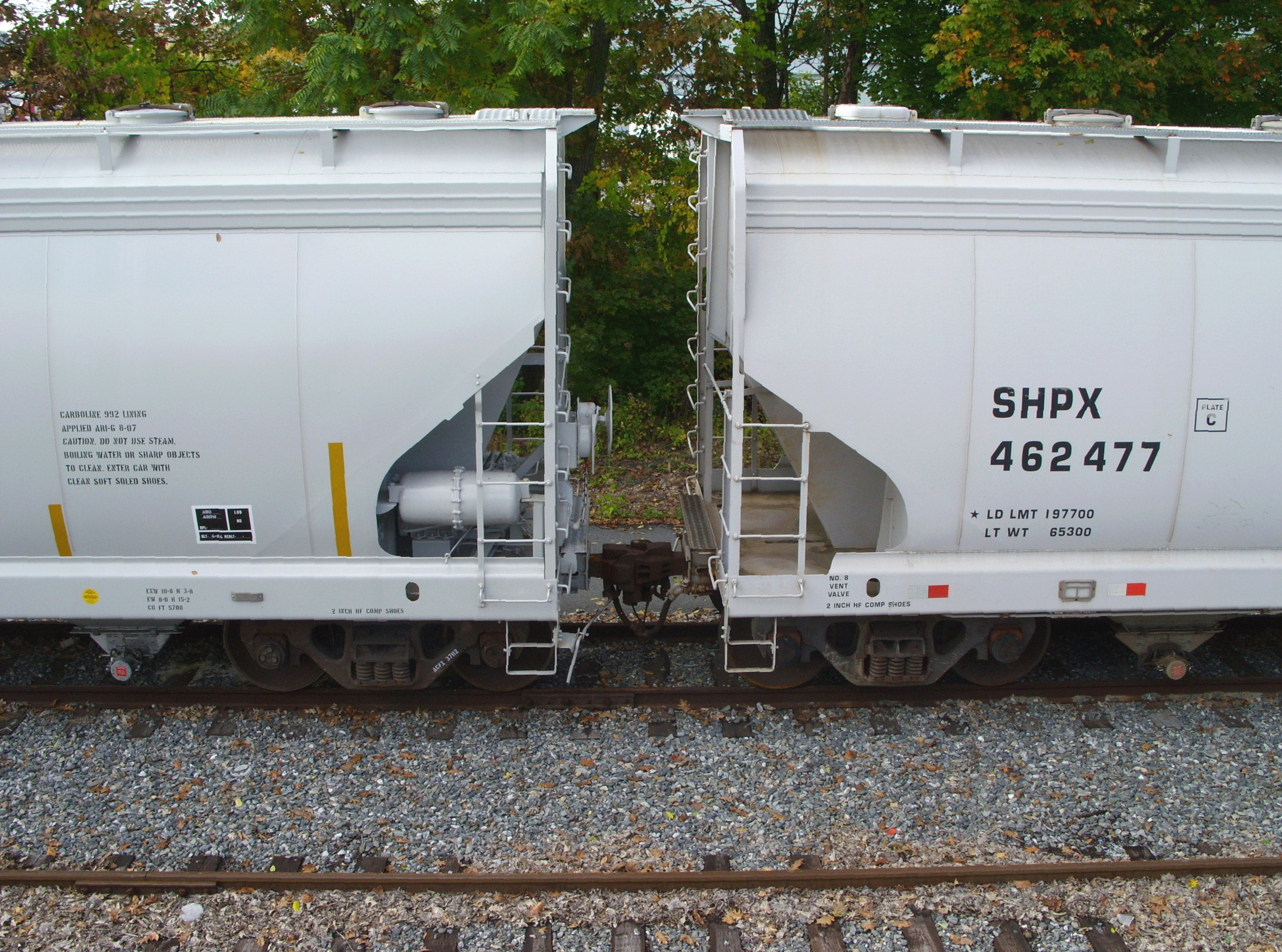
A covered hopper with SHPX markings

The Association of American Railroads (AAR) assigns marks to all carriers, under authority granted by the U.S. Surface Transportation Board, Transport Canada, and Mexican Government. Railinc, a subsidiary of the AAR, maintains the active reporting marks for the North American rail industry.

Under current practice, the first letter must match the initial letter of the railroad name. As it also acts as a Standard Carrier Alpha Code, the reporting mark cannot conflict with codes in use by other nonrail carriers.

Marks ending with the letter "X" are assigned to companies or individuals who own railcars, but are not operating railroads; (Note: "X" originally meant "express", as the first non-railroad car owners were express companies such as Adams Express.) for example, the TTX Company (formerly Trailer Train Company) is named for its original reporting mark of TTX. In another example, the reporting mark for state-funded Amtrak services in California is CDTX (whereas the usual Amtrak mark is AMTK) because the state transportation agency (Caltrans) owns the equipment used in these services. This may also apply to commuter rail, for example Metrolink in Southern California uses the reporting mark SCAX because the equipment is owned by the Southern California Regional Rail Authority—which owns the Metrolink system—even though it is operated by Amtrak. This is why the reporting mark for CSX Transportation, which is an operating railroad, is CSXT instead of CSX. Private (non-common carrier) freight car owners in Mexico were issued, up until around 1990, reporting marks ending in two X's, possibly to signify that their cars followed different regulations (such as bans on friction bearing trucks) than their American counterparts and so their viability for interchange service was impaired. This often resulted in five-letter reporting marks, an option not otherwise allowed by the AAR.

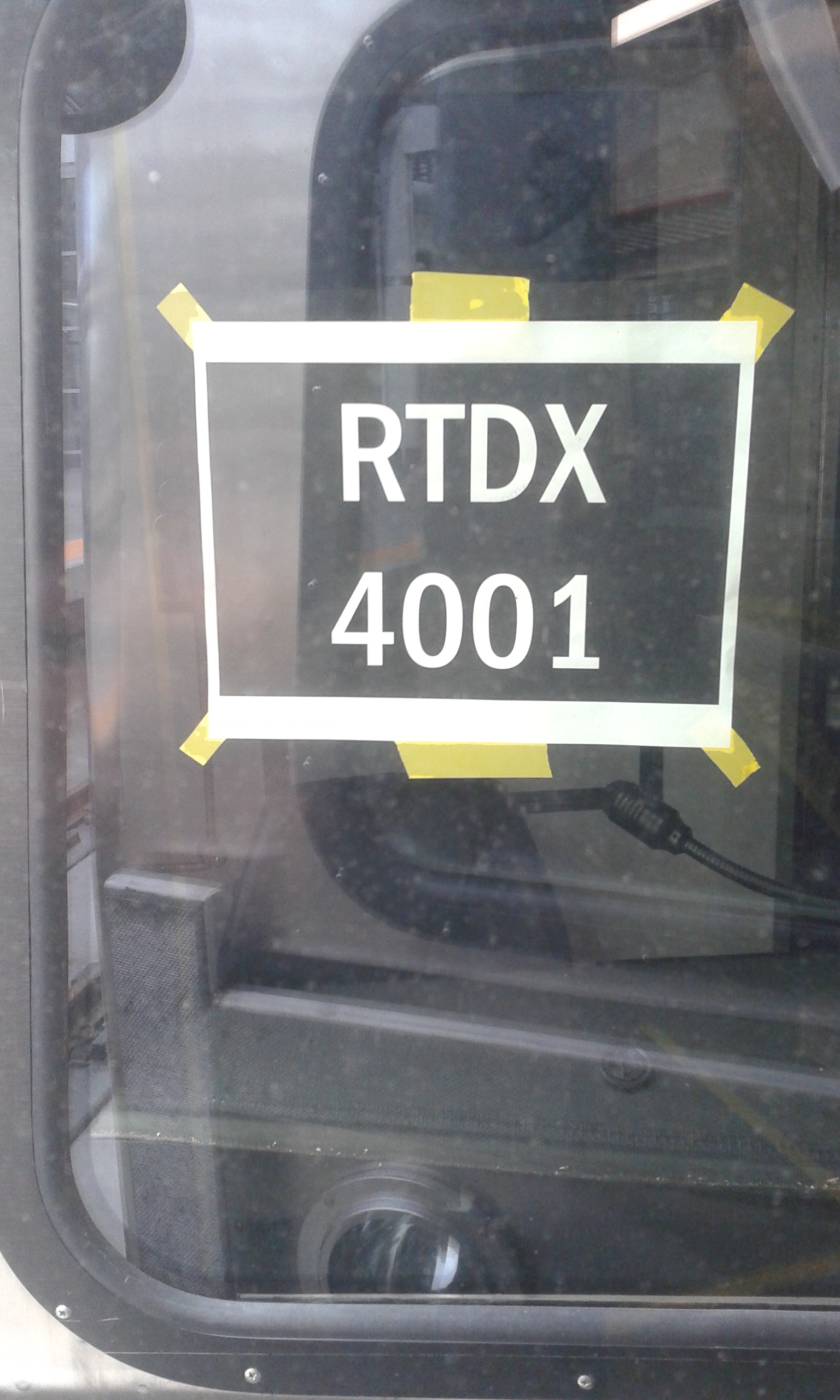
A temporary window sign with RTDX markings

Companies owning trailers used in trailer-on-flatcar service are assigned marks ending with the letter "Z", and the National Motor Freight Traffic Association, which maintains the list of Standard Carrier Alpha Codes, assigns marks ending in "U" to owners of intermodal containers. Marks for intermodal containers carried by ship are assigned by the Bureau International des Containers, even when the containers are also transported by rail. The standard ISO 6346 covers identifiers for intermodal containers.

When the owner of a reporting mark is taken over by another company, the old mark becomes the property of the new company. For example, when the Union Pacific Railroad (mark UP) acquired the Chicago and North Western Railway (mark CNW) in 1995, it retained the CNW mark rather than immediately repaint all acquired equipment. Some companies own several marks that are used to identify different classes of cars, such as boxcars or gondolas. If the acquiring company discontinues the name or mark of the acquired company, the discontinued mark is referred to as a "fallen flag" railway. Occasionally, long-disused marks are suddenly revived by the companies which now own them. For example, in recent years, the Union Pacific Railroad has begun to use the mark CMO on newly built covered hoppers, gondolas and five-bay coal hoppers. CMO originally belonged to Chicago, St. Paul, Minneapolis and Omaha Railway, a predecessor of the CNW, from which the UP inherited it. Similarly, during the breakup of Conrail, the long-retired marks of the Pennsylvania Railroad (PRR) and New York Central Railroad (NYC) were temporarily brought back and applied to much of Conrail's fleet to signify which cars and locomotives were to go to CSX (all cars labeled NYC) and which to Norfolk Southern (all cars labeled PRR). Some of these cars still retain their temporary NYC marks.

==== List of North American reporting marks ====
Because of its size, this list has been split into subpages based on the first letter of the reporting mark:

=== Europe since 2006 ===
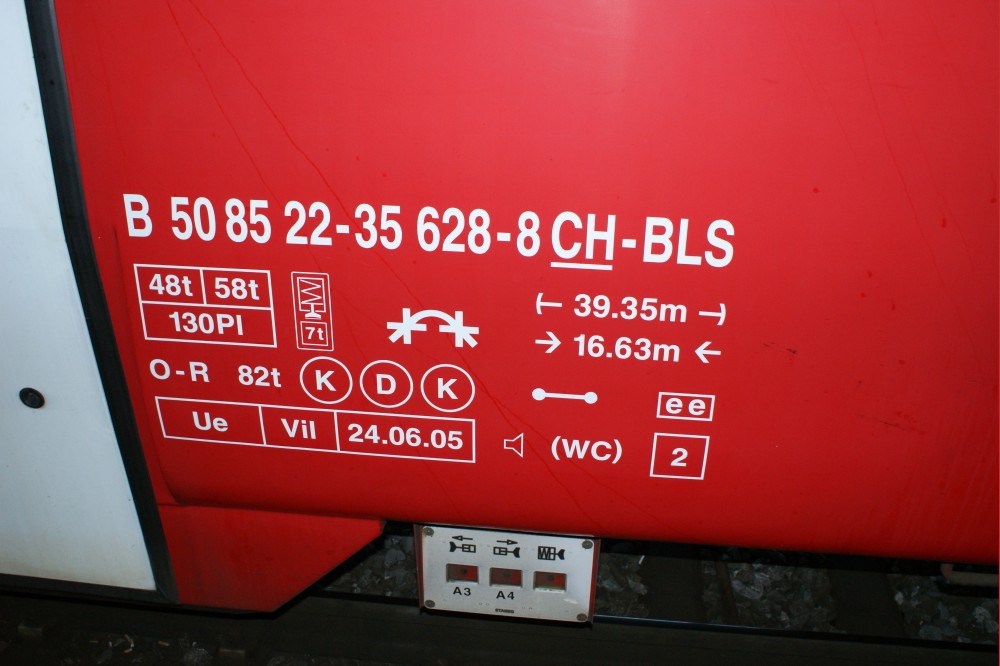
BLS coach registered in Switzerland (85 = CH)

A railway vehicle must be registered in the relevant state's National Vehicle Register (NVR), as part of which process it will be assigned a 12-digit European Vehicle Number (EVN). The EVN schema is essentially the same as that used by the earlier UIC numbering systems for tractive vehicles and wagons, except that it replaces the 2-digit vehicle owner's code (see § Europe 1964 to 2005) with a 2-digit code indicating the vehicle's register country. The registered keeper of a vehicle is now indicated by a separate Vehicle Keeper Marking (VKM), usually the name of the owning company or an abbreviation thereof, which must be registered with the Intergovernmental Organisation for International Carriage by Rail (OTIF) and the European Union Agency for Railways (ERA) and which is unique throughout Europe and parts of Asia and Northern Africa.

The VKM must be between two and five letters in length (Note: There is a specific exemption to the length requirement for Belgian operator NMBS/SNCB, allowing them to use as a VKM their corporate logo of a single letter B enclosed within a circle.) and can use any of the 26 letters of the Latin alphabet. Diacritical marks may also be used, but they are ignored in data processing (for example, Ö is treated as though it is O).

The VKM is preceded by the code for the country (according to the alphabetical coding system described in Appendix 4 to the 1949 convention and Article 45(4) of the 1968 convention on road traffic), where the vehicle is registered and a hyphen. Some examples:

Code	Country	Keeper
A-ÖBB	Austria	Österreichische Bundesbahnen
B-Ⓑ	Belgium	National Railway Company of Belgium, which uses an encircled blue B as its logo. Using either 'NMBS' or 'SNCB' (acronyms of its name in respectively Dutch and French) would not be linguistically neutral and thus a politically charged decision in Belgium.
CH-SBB	Confoederatio Helvetica (Switzerland)	Schweizer Bundesbahnen
D-DB	Deutschland (Germany)	Deutsche Bahn AG
F-SNCF	France	Société nationale des chemins de fer français
I-FS	Italy	Ferrovie dello Stato Italiane
L-CFL	Luxembourg	Société Nationale des Chemins de Fer Luxembourgeois
NL-NS	Netherlands	Nederlandse Spoorwegen
TR-TCDD	Turkey	Türkiye Cumhuriyeti Devlet Demiryolları

When a vehicle is sold it will not normally be transferred to another register. The Czech railways bought large numbers of coaches from ÖBB. The number remained the same but the VKM changed from A-ÖBB to A-ČD.

=== Europe 1964 to 2005 ===
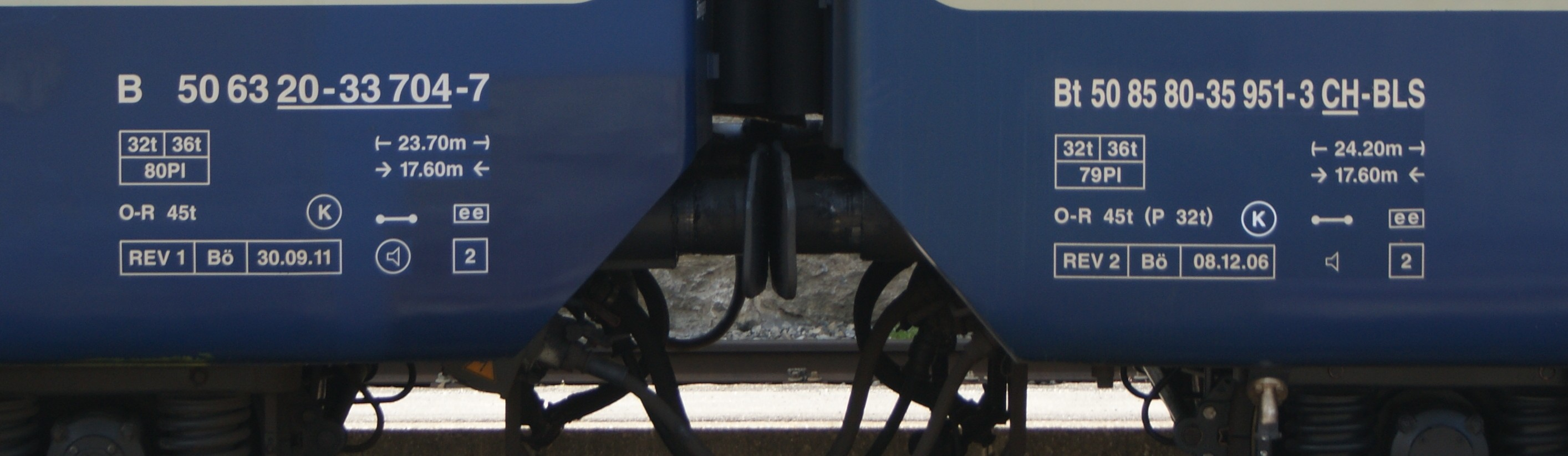
BLS coaches, on the left still with owner code 63, on the right with country code 85 and VKM BLS

The UIC introduced a uniform numbering system for their members based on a 12-digit number, largely known as UIC number. The third and fourth digit of the number indicated the owner, or more precisely the keeper of the vehicle. Thus each UIC member got a two-digit owner code. With the introduction of national vehicle registers this code became a country code. Some vehicles had to be renumbered as a consequence. The Swiss company BLS Lötschbergbahn had the owner code 63. When their vehicles were registered, they got numbers with the country code 85 for Switzerland and the VKM BLS. Example for an "Einheitswagen" delivered in 1957:

- delivered as BLS B 831
- renumbered with UIC number 50 63 20-33 801-5
- rebuilt 1991 and renumbered 50 63 20-33 705-4
- registered as 50 85 20-35 451-7 CH-BLS

=== United Kingdom ===
In the United Kingdom, prior to nationalisation, wagons owned by the major railways were marked with codes of two to four letters, these codes normally being the initials of the railway concerned; for example, wagons of the Great Western Railway were marked "G W"; those of the London, Midland and Scottish Railway were marked "L M S", etc. The codes were agreed between the railways and registered with the Railway Clearing House.

=== India ===
In India, wagons owned by the Indian Railways are marked with codes of two to four letters, these codes normally being the initials of the railway divisions concerned along with the Hindi abbreviation; for example, trains of the Western Railway zone are marked "WR" and "प रे"; those of the Central Railway zone are marked "CR" and "मध्य", etc. The codes are agreed between the railways and registered with the Ministry of Railways, Government of India.

List of IR Zones
	Railway Zone	Code	Zone Headquarters
1.	Northern Railway	NR	Delhi
2.	North Eastern Railway	NER	Gorakhpur
3.	Northeast Frontier Railway	NFR	Guwahati
4.	Eastern Railway	ER	Kolkata
5.	South Eastern Railway	SER	Kolkata
6.	South Central Railway	SCR	Secunderabad (Hyderabad)
7.	Southern Railway	SR	Chennai
8.	Central Railway	CR	Mumbai
9.	Western Railway	WR	Mumbai
10.	South Western Railway	SWR	Hubballi
11.	North Western Railway	NWR	Jaipur
12.	West Central Railway	WCR	Jabalpur
13.	North Central Railway	NCR	Allahabad
14.	South East Central Railway	SECR	Bilaspur
15.	East Coast Railway	ECoR	Bhubaneswar
16.	East Central Railway	ECR	Hajipur
17.	Kolkata Metro	MR	Kolkata
18.	South Coast Railway	SCoR	Visakhapatnam

== See also ==
- Automatic equipment identification
- UIC Country Code, a series of prefixes used on rolling stock identification numbers by members of the International Union of Railways (UIC) to identify the country of origin of railway rolling stock
- UIC wagon numbers
