= UIC classification of locomotive axle arrangements =

Classification

The UIC classification of locomotive axle arrangements, sometimes known as the German classification or German system, describes the wheel arrangement of locomotives, multiple units and trams. It is used in much of the world, notable exceptions being the United Kingdom and North America. (Note: In United Kingdom and North America, the Whyte notation is used for steam locomotives (and small diesel shunters in the UK). United Kingdom otherwise uses its own slightly simplified form of UIC. North America otherwise uses the AAR wheel arrangement, essentially another simplification of the UIC system.)

The classification system is managed by the International Union of Railways (UIC).

== Structure ==
The UIC uses the following structure:

Upper-case letters
Indicate driving axles, starting at A for a single axle. B thus indicates two and C indicates three consecutive pairs of driving wheels, etc.
Lower-case "o"
Related to driving axles (minimum 2, "B"), indicates they are individually driven by separate traction motors.
Numbers
Consecutive non-driving axles, starting with 1 for a single axle.
Prime symbol " ′ "
The axles indicated by a single letter or number are mounted on a bogie.
Parentheses
Groups letters and numbers describing the same bogie. For example, (A1A) indicates a three-axle bogie with the outer two axles driven. When parentheses are used around a single letter or number, a prime is not needed to indicate a bogie. Articulated locomotives can be indicated by bracketing the front power unit — for example, the Union Pacific Big Boy, 4-8-8-4 in Whyte notation, is (2′D)D2′ in UIC notation.
Plus sign "+"
The locomotive or multiple unit consists of permanently coupled but mechanically separate traction units.

Garratt locomotives are indicated by bracketing or placing plus signs between all individual units.

Other suffixes
- h: superheated steam (German: Heißdampf, lit. 'hot steam')
- n: saturated steam (German: Nassdampf, lit. 'wet steam')
- v: compound (German: Verbund)
- Turb: turbine
- number: number of cylinders
- t: tank locomotive
- tr: tram (urban) locomotive
- E: Engerth-type locomotive
- G: freight (German: Güterzug, lit. 'goods train'). Also used to indicate shunting locomotives
- P: passenger (German: Personenzug, lit. 'passenger train')
- S: fast passenger (German: Schnellzug, lit. 'express train')

The most common wheel arrangements in modern locomotives are Bo′Bo′ and Co′Co′.

== Examples ==
The following examples are based on the UIC classification:

(A1A)(A1A)
Two bogies or wheel assemblies under the unit. Each bogie has one powered axle, one idle axle, and one more powered axle. All powered axles are individually driven by traction motors.
BB
Four powered axles all mounted in the locomotive's frame, driven in pairs, i.e. each pair of axles is connected by driving rods or gears. Compare with "D" below. (Whyte notation: 0-4-4-0)
B′B′
Two bogies or wheel assemblies under the unit. Each bogie has two powered axles, connected by driving rods or gears.
Bo′(A1A)
Two bogies or wheel assemblies. The "Bo′" bogie is under one end of the unit, and has two powered axles, while the "(A1A)" bogie under the other end of the unit has one powered axle, one idle axle, and another powered axle. All powered axles are individually driven by traction motors.
Bo′Bo′
Two bogies or wheel assemblies under the unit. Each bogie has two powered axles individually driven by traction motors. Three-quarters of all modern locomotives (and power cars of self-propelled trains) are configured in either this or the "B′B′" arrangement.
Bo′Bo′Bo′
Three bogies or wheel assemblies under the unit. Each bogie has two powered axles individually driven by traction motors.
C
Three powered axles, connected by driving rods or gears, all mounted in the locomotive's frame (Whyte notation: 0-6-0).
C′C′
Two bogies or wheel assemblies under the unit. Each bogie has three powered axles, connected by driving rods or gears. One such example of this type is Southern Pacific 9010.
Co′Co′
Two bogies or wheel assemblies under the unit. Each bogie has three powered axles individually driven by traction motors.
(2Co)(Co2)
A locomotive with two bogies, each with two leading axles and three individually powered axles. A number of Japanese electric locomotives used this wheel arrangement, including the JNR Class EF58, and the PRR GG1.
D
Four powered axles, connected by driving rods or gears, all mounted in the locomotive's frame (Whyte notation: 0-8-0).
1′D1′
One leading idle (non-driven) axle mounted in a bogie, four driven axles mounted in the frame and connected by driving rods or gears, followed by one trailing idle axle mounted in a bogie (Whyte notation: 2-8-2).
E
Five powered axles, mounted in the locomotive's frame (Whyte notation: 0-10-0).
Cn2Gt
No leading axle, three driven axles mounted in the frame, no trailing axle, simple steam expansion, saturated steam, two cylinders, for freight trains/shunting duties, tank engine (Whyte notation: 0-6-0T).
2′D1′h3S
Two front leading axles grouped in a bogie, four driving axles, one trailing axle in a bogie, simple steam expansion, superheated steam, three-cylinders, for fast trains (Whyte notation: 4-8-2).
1′E1′h2Gt
One front leading axle in a bogie, five driving axles, one rear trailing axle, simple steam expansion, superheated steam, two-cylinder machine, for freight trains, tank engine (Whyte notation: 2-10-2T).
1′Dn4vP
One front leading axle in a bogie, four driving axles, saturated steam, four-cylinder machine, compound (double steam expansion), for passenger trains (Whyte notation: 2-8-0).
D′Dh4vtG
No front leading axle, four driving axles in a bogie, four more driven axles mounted in the frame (Mallet locomotive), superheated steam, four-cylinder machine, compound (double steam expansion), tank locomotive, for freight trains (Whyte notation: 0-8-8-0T).

== See also ==
- AAR wheel arrangement
- Class (locomotive)
- Co-Co locomotive
- International Union of Railways
- List of UIC country codes
- Swiss locomotive and railcar classification
- UIC classification of goods wagons
- UIC classification of railway coaches
- UIC identification marking for tractive stock
- Wheel arrangement
