= UIC identification marking for tractive stock =

Registry number for locomotives and multiple units

The UIC identification marking for tractive stock is a standard for identifying train stock like locomotives that supply tractive force primarily in Europe. Since the beginning of 2007 locomotives or other traction units in Europe have been given a 12-digit number. Vehicle numbering is now governed by the Intergovernmental Organisation for International Carriage by Rail and in Technical Specifications for Interoperability (TSI) of the European Union, specifically the European Railway Agency's CR OPE TSI (Conventional Rail OPErations Technical Specification for Interoperability). This makes the locomotive clearly identifiable within Europe and parts of Asia and northern Africa (see List of UIC country codes).

A complete number is referred to as a European Vehicle Number and comprises 12 digits as originally outlined in UIC Code of Practice 438-3, Identification marking for tractive stock. Digits 1–2 are the type code, 3–4 the country of origin (where the vehicle is registered), 5–11 are defined by the country concerned, 12 is the check digit calculated via the Luhn algorithm. It is followed by abbreviations for the country of origin and the owner of the vehicle.

The EU CR OPE TSI required that by 1 August 2008 all traction units had to be registered and marked with their number. Existing locomotive numbers used internally were not necessarily affected, but meanwhile in many countries the vehicles got 12-digit numbers.

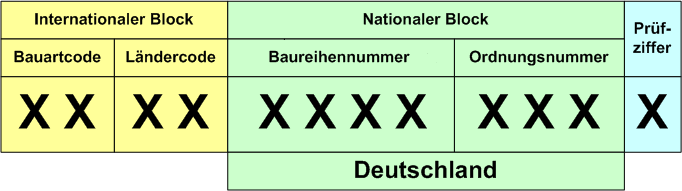
UIC classification scheme for locomotives in Germany. For explanation see text.

== International section ==
=== Type code ===
Digit 1 is '9'

If digit 2 describes the type of tractive stock, the following coding is mandatory:

90	Miscellaneous (tractive unit not otherwise classified, e.g. steam locomotive)
91	Electric locomotive
92	Diesel locomotive
93	Electric multiple unit (high speed) [power car or trailer]
94	Electric multiple unit (not high speed) [power car or trailer]
95	Diesel multiple unit [power car or trailer]
96	Specialised trailer
97	Electric shunter
98	Diesel shunter
99	Special vehicle (e.g. Departmental tractive unit)

The above codes have been altered from those shown in UIC 438-3 by ERA CR OPE TSI; this table was updated on 22 January 2012 to include the most recent wording.

=== Country code ===
see List of UIC country codes

== National block ==
=== Germany ===
A register of tractive units has been introduced by the Federal Railway Office (Eisenbahnbundesamt, EBA), which also issues vehicle numbers. Digits 5–8 are a four-digit class number, 9–11 the three-digit serial number of the vehicle within its class.

For class numbers for vehicles in the existing Deutsche Bahn fleet, DB selected digits 5–8 so that the previous number could continue to be used without affecting the check digit: changing the check digit was needed only for combustion-engined railcars. For new DB vehicles, such as the Alstom Class 1214 introduced in 2008, this is not valid. Although they are internally counted as Class 262, they have been given a number corresponding to the class used by the manufacturer.

As a result of the requirement to be entered into the register, vehicles and classes were included that had never been part of the DB. These were allocated to new classes by the EBA, no longer based around DB historical classification. This has caused misunderstandings, because the classes are now generally made up of four-digit numbers (digits 5–8) that no longer indicate the type of vehicle, now shown by the type code (digits 1–2).

Example:

From the last three digits, class "0128" could appear to be an electric locomotive. However the full number includes the type code "98", so it is a diesel shunter. The three-digit numbers "3xy" or "2xy" previously used by DB are not part of the new numbers. They are obsolete, found only in the numbers of former state railway vehicles.

Vehicles that are used both by DB and private railways are allocated to the same class – the difference is recognisable from the owner's abbreviation. One advantage of the system is its simplicity, because when vehicles change ownership they retain the same number: only the abbreviation of the owner's name needs to be changed. For a major rebuild the number can be changed to that of an appropriate class.

See also List of classes in the German Rail Vehicle Register

=== Italy ===
In Italy document ANSF 04658/09 issued on 17-08-2009 by ANSF (Agenzia Nazionale per la Sicurezza delle Ferrovie), who maintains the RIN (Registro Immatricolazione Nazionale). According to these rules, digits 5-11 are thus subdivided: Digit 5 is the vehicle type

Digit 5	Meaning
0	Unspecified
1	Traction only
2	Traction and drive cab
3	Traction, drive cab and 1st class passenger compartment(s)
4	Traction, drive cab and 2nd class passenger compartment(s)
5	Traction and 1st class passenger compartment(s)
6	Traction and 2nd class passenger compartment(s)
7	Drive cab and 1st class passenger compartment(s)
8	Drive cab and 2nd class passenger compartment(s)
9	Not used - available

The following 3 digits are the class number (the Italian word is 'Gruppo') while the digits 9–11 the three-digit serial number of the vehicle within its class.

The method of applying and spacing the digits differs between operators. For example a British Rail Class 66 loco registered in Britain has been seen to carry the number: GB 9 2 70 0 066246-4, with the existing national number "66246" underlined, and lacking the operator identifying code. Frequently the commonly used national part of the number is underlined in order to make it more readily identifiable.

== Check digit ==
The check digit is calculated from digits 1–11 using the Luhn algorithm. It is derived from the sum of the numbers that arise when the digits are alternately multiplied by 2 and 1; the difference of this sum from the next multiple of ten produces the check digit (for examples of this see wagon numbers).

== Keeper's code ==
For every railway that enters its tractive units into the register, a clear European-wide code is needed, separate from the number. This alphanumerical Vehicle Keeper Marking (VKM) is allocated by a railway administration in accordance with CR OPE TSI. The list of keeper codes is linked below. (The keeper will be different to the owner of a vehicle where a leasing agreement is in force.)

== Example ==
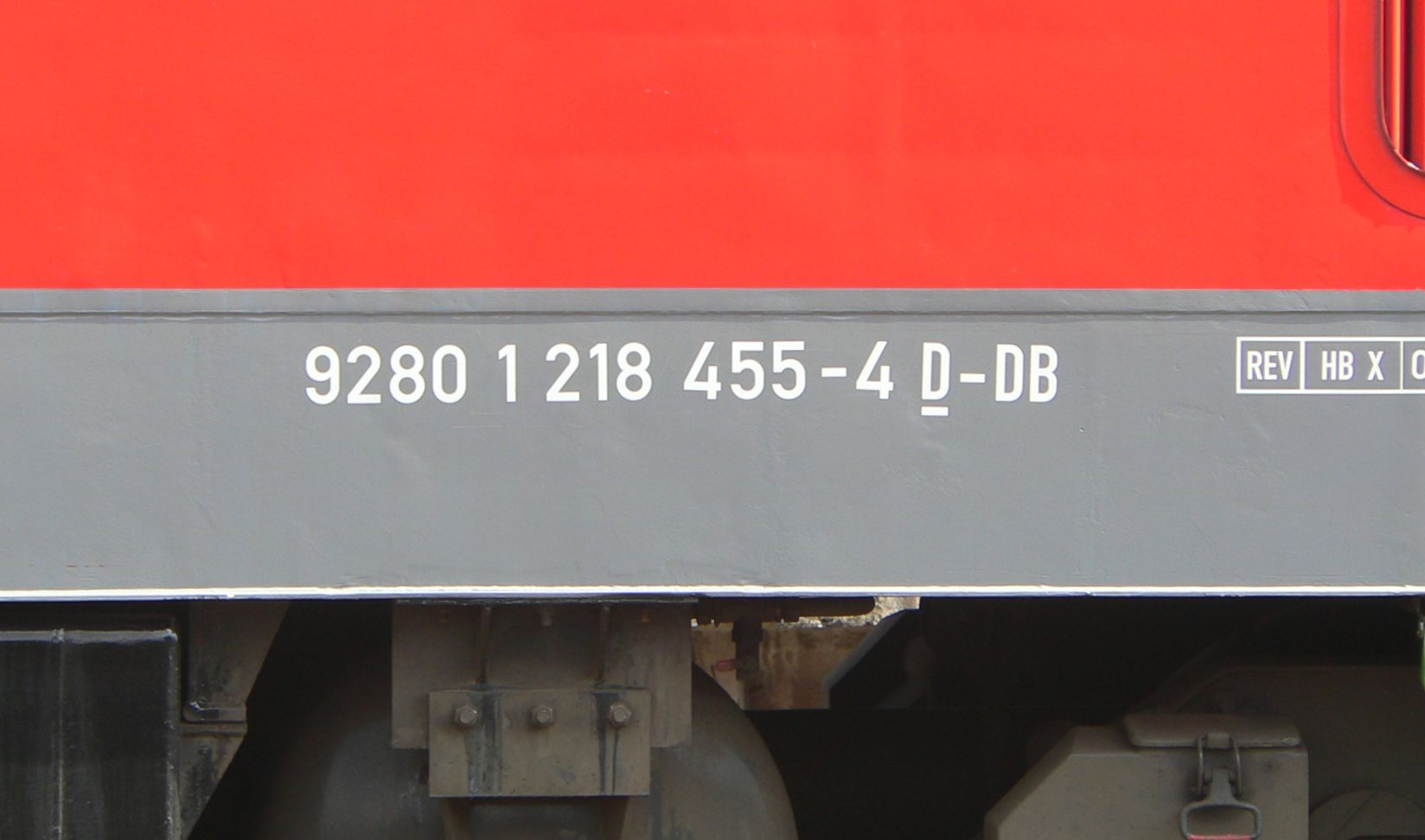
Example of a UIC vehicle number

Meaning of 92 80 1218 455-4 D-DB
92	Type, here diesel locomotive, top speed up from 100 km/h
80	Country, here Germany
1218	Federal Railway Office type, here DB Class 218
455	Serial
4	Check digit
D-DB	Keeper, here Deutsche Bahn.

== Older identification systems ==
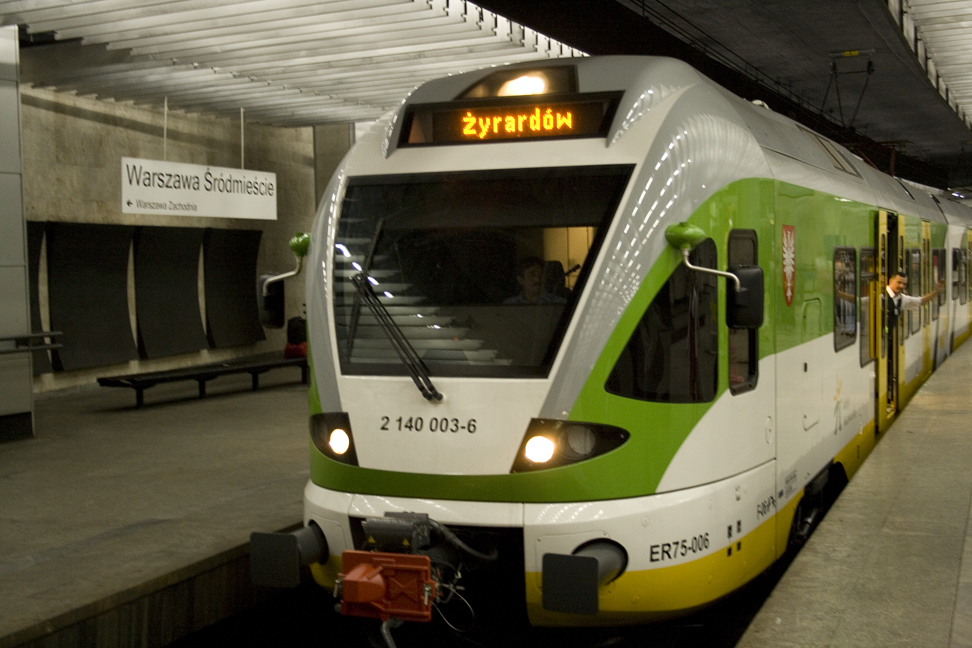
Example in Poland - train at Warszawa Śródmieście, shows on foreground UIC markings however missing first four numbers (country and type because of local usage) – (94 51) 2 140 003-6, with additional national class number – ER75-006.

In the past, each railway adopted its own identification system. Each locomotive was given a road number or running number which would sometimes be combined with a class number. For example British Rail diesel and electric locomotives have five-digit numbers of which the first two digits are the class number and the remaining digits are the running number, e.g. 37 409.

== See also ==
- UIC classification of locomotive axle arrangements
- UIC classification of railway coaches
- UIC classification of goods wagons
- UIC country codes
- UIC wagon numbers
