= UIC classification of goods wagons =

International classification for rolling stock

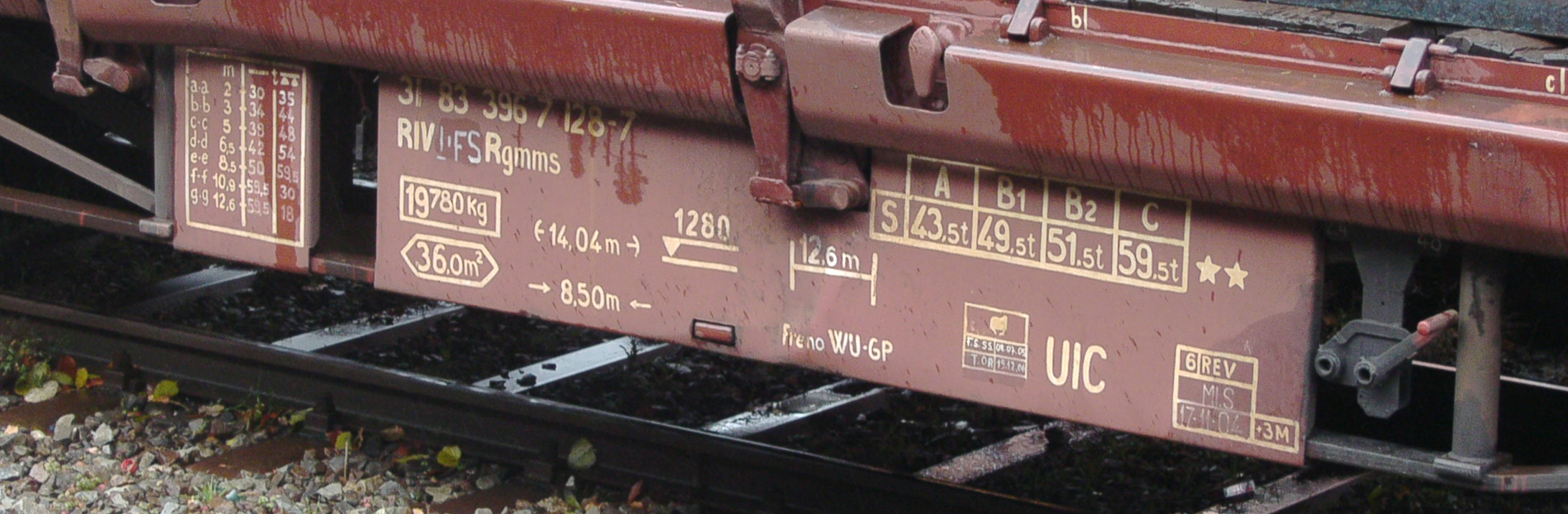
Inscription on an Italian flat wagon of Class Rgmms.

This list contains the UIC classification of goods wagons and their meanings. The description is made up of a category letter (in capitals) and usually several index letters (in lower case).

The international system for the classification of goods wagons was agreed by the Union internationale des chemins de fer (UIC) in 1965 and subsequently introduced into member countries. For example it was adopted in Germany on 1 January 1968 replacing the previous German railway wagon classes that originated as early as 1905. The UIC classification has been amended several times since it began.

Not all wagons are given UIC designations. In Germany the few remaining guards vans and narrow gauge goods wagons have retained their original classifications.

== Category letters ==
The following table contains the complete list of standard category letters. Letters A, B, C, D, P and W are reserved for coaches. However, also S is used for coaches and this doubles a goods wagons class. These are covered in detail in the article on UIC classification of railway coaches. Each goods wagons type is given a type number, whose first digit forms the fifth digit of the 12-digit UIC wagon number.

Class	Wagon type	1st digit of type no. (5th digit of UIC no.)
E	Ordinary open high-sided wagon	5
F	Special open high-sided wagon	6
G	Ordinary covered wagon	1
H	Special covered wagon	2
I	Refrigerated van	8
K	Ordinary flat wagon with separate axles	3
L	Special flat wagon with separate axles	4
O	Open multi-purpose wagon (composite open high-sided flat wagon)	3
R	Ordinary flat wagon with bogies	3
S	Special flat wagon with bogies	4
T	Goods wagon with opening roof	0 (before 1988: 5)
U	Special wagons	9
Z	Tank wagon	7

== Index letters ==
=== International index letters ===
	Classes	Meaning
a	E, F, G, H, I, T, U, Z	4 wheelsets (Note: In the version of the classification scheme valid up to 1979 a meant bogie wagon, aa was not applicable to classes E, F, G, H, T, U, Z.)
a	L, O	3 wheelsets
a	S	6 wheelsets
aa	E, F, G, H, T, U, Z	≥ 6 wheelsets
aa	L	≥ 4 wheelsets
aa	S	≥ 8 wheelsets
b	F	Wagon with separate wheelsets and a volume greater than 45 m^{3} (1,600 cu ft)
b	G	Wagon with separate wheelsets and of 12 m (39 ft 4 1/2 in) length or more and 70 m^{2} (750 sq ft) loading area
b	H	Wagon with separate wheelsets and of length 12–14 m (39 ft 4 1/2 in – 45 ft 11 1/8 in), 70 m^{3} (2,500 cu ft) volume, may be less for ferry wagons (f)
b	I	Wagon separate wheelsets and loading area 22–27 m^{2} (240–290 sq ft)
b	T	Wagon with separate wheelsets and length over 12 m (39 ft 4 1/2 in)
b	G, T	Bogie wagon with loading length of 18 m (59 ft 5/8 in) or more
b	H	Bogie wagon with loading length 18–22 m (59 ft 5/8 in – 72 ft 2 1/8 in)
b	K	Bogie wagon with long stakes
b	L, S	Transporter for medium-sized containers
bb	H	Bogie wagon with loading length of 22 m (72 ft 2 1/8 in) or more
bb	I	Wagon with separate wheelsets and loading area of 27 m^{2} (290 sq ft) or more 22 m (72 ft 2 1/8 in) or more
bb	H	Bogie wagon with loading length of 22 m (72 ft 2 1/8 in) or more
c	E	Discharging trap on the wagon floor
c	F	Controllable gravity discharging wagon. Underside of floor ≥70 cm (27 1/2 in) above top of rails
c	H, T	Door in front wall
c	I	Meat hooks
c	L, S	Cradle
c	U, Z	Compressed air or air blast discharging system
cc	F	Controllable gravity discharge hopper. Underside of floor <70 cm (27 1/2 in) above top of rails
cc	H	Door in end wall and interior equipment for the transportation of motor vehicles
d	H	Floor trap
d	I	For sea fish
d	L, S	For transportation of motor vehicles on one level
d	T, U	Controllable gravity discharge hopper, Underside of floor ≥70 cm (27 1/2 in) above top of rails (Note: Up to 1979 both wagons with metered as well as those with loose gravity discharge were designated with a d.)
dd	T, U	Controllable gravity discharge hopper. Underside of floor <70 cm (27 1/2 in) above top of rails, cannot be used with lifting equipment
e	H	Two levels
e	I	Electrical forced-air heating
e	L, S	Double-decker wagon for motor vehicles
e	R	Folding sides
e	T	Door height over 1.90 m (6 ft 2 3/4 in)
e	Z	Heating equipment
ee	H	More than 2 levels
f	F, H, I, L, O, S, T, U, Z	Great Britain loading gauge, suitable for ferries and channel tunnel
ff	F, H, I, L, O, S, T, U, Z	Great Britain loading gauge, suitable for channel tunnel only
fff	F, H, I, L, O, S, T, U, Z	Great Britain loading gauge, suitable for ferries only
g	G, H, T, U	For grain
g	I	Refrigerated van with cooling equipment
g	K, L, R	For container transport
g	S	For containers up to 60 feet
g	Z	For sealed or liquified gases or gas dissolved under pressure
gg	I	Refrigerated van, cooled with liquid gas
gg	S	For containers up to 80 feet
h	G, H	For early vegetables
h	I	With thick insulation
h	L, R, S, T	For sheet metal coils laid horizontally
hh	L, R, S, T	For sheet metal coils laid vertically
i	H, T	Opening side walls (sliding walls)
i	I	Refrigerated van with refrigerator on trailer wagon
i	K, L, R, S	Fixed front wall, movable top cover
i	U	Low-loading platform
i	Z	Non-metal containers
ii	H	High-strength sliding walls
ii	I	Technical trailer
k	E, F, G, H, K, L(a), O, T, U, Z	Maximum load on class C route: m < 20 t (20 long tons; 22 short tons)
k	Ea, Fa, Ga, Ha, Laa, R, S, Ta, Ua, Za	Maximum load on class C route: m < 40 t (39 long tons; 44 short tons)
k	Eaa, Faa, Gaa, Haa, Sa(a), Taa, Uaa, Zaa	Maximum load on class C route: m < 50 t (49 long tons; 55 short tons) (Note: In version of the classification scheme valid up to 1979 there was also a load limit 40 t.)
k	I	Maximum load on class C route: m < 15 t (15 long tons; 17 short tons)
k	Ia	Maximum load on class C route: m < 30 t (30 long tons; 33 short tons)
kk	E, F, G, H, K, L(a), O, T, U, Z	Maximum load on class C route: 20 t (20 long tons; 22 short tons) ≤ m < 25 t (25 long tons; 28 short tons) (Note: The index letter was not part of the original 1966 version and was not introduced until later.)
kk	Ea, Fa, Ga, Ha, Laa, R, S, Ta, Ua, Za	Maximum load on class C route: 40 t (39 long tons; 44 short tons) ≤ m < 50 t (49 long tons; 55 short tons)
kk	Eaa, Faa, Gaa, Haa, Sa(a), Taa, Uaa, Zaa	Maximum load on class C route: 50 t (49 long tons; 55 short tons) ≤ m < 60 t (59 long tons; 66 short tons)
l	E	Not tippable
l	F, T, U	Loose (i.e. not controllable) gravity discharge hopper. Underside of floor ≥70 cm (27 1/2 in) above top of rails
l	G	Up to 8 cm (3 5/32 in) ventilation space
l	H	With movable partitions (from 1 May 1994)
l	I	Insulated wagon without ice chests
l	K, L, O, R, S	No stakes
ll	F, T, U	Loose gravity discharge hopper; underside of floor <70 cm (27 1/2 in) above top of rails
ll	—	No lifting gear allowed
ll	H	With lockable partitions (from 1 May 1994)
m	E	Loading length (Note: In the DR the definition was initially just "length under …m", which referred to the length over buffers. As a result numerous wagons were given the wrong classification with the m missing.) (Note: In the original 1965 version m was only intended for classes E, G, I, K, O, R.): l < 7.7 m (25 ft 3 1/8 in)
m	Ea(a)	Loading length: l < 12 m (39 ft 4 1/2 in)
m	G, H, T	Loading length: l < 9 m (29 ft 6 3/8 in)
m	Ga(a), Ha(a), Ta(a)	Loading length: l < 15 m (49 ft 2 1/2 in)
m	I	Loading area: A < 19 m^{2} (200 sq ft)
m	Ia	Loading area: A < 39 m^{2} (420 sq ft)
m	K, O, L	Loading length: 9 m (29 ft 6 3/8 in) ≤ l < 12 m (39 ft 4 1/2 in)
m	R, S	Loading length: 15 m (49 ft 2 1/2 in) ≤ l < 18 m (59 ft 5/8 in)
m	La(a), Sa(a)	Loading length: 18 m (59 ft 5/8 in) ≤ l < 22 m (72 ft 2 1/8 in)
mm	K, O, L	Loading length (Note: In the original 1965 version mm was only intended for classes K, O, R.): l < 9 m (29 ft 6 3/8 in)
mm	R, S	Loading length: l < 15 m (49 ft 2 1/2 in)
mm	La(a), Sa(a)	Loading length: l < 18 m (59 ft 5/8 in)
n	I	Maximum load on class C route: m > 25 t (25 long tons; 28 short tons)
n	H	Maximum load on class C route: m > 28 t (28 long tons; 31 short tons)
n	E, G, K, L, T	Maximum load on class C route: m > 30 t (30 long tons; 33 short tons)
n	F, O, U, Z	Maximum load on class C route: m > 30 t (30 long tons; 33 short tons) for twin-axled wagons / m > 40 t (39 long tons; 44 short tons) for three-axled wagons
n	Ia, La	maximum load at limit of load C: m > 40 t (39 long tons; 44 short tons)
n	Ea, Fa, Ga, Ha, Laa, R, S, Ta, Ua, Za	Maximum load on class C route: m > 60 t (59 long tons; 66 short tons)
n	Eaa, Faa, Gaa, Haa, Sa(a), Taa, Uaa, Zaa	Maximum load on class C route: m > 60 t (59 long tons; 66 short tons)
o	E	Not end-tipping
o	F, T, U	Loose gravity discharge hopper. Underside of floor ≥70 cm (27 1/2 in) above top of rails. Lifting gear not usable
o	G, H	Twin-axled with loading length under 12 m (39 ft 4 1/2 in) and more than 70 m^{3} (2,500 cu ft) loading area
o	I	Ice chests under 3.5 m^{3} (120 cu ft)
o	K	Fixed sides
o	R	Fixed end walls under 2 m (6 ft 6 3/4 in)
o	S	Articulated wagon with three twin-axled bogies
oo	F, T, U	Loose gravity discharge hopper. Underside of floor <70 cm (27 1/2 in) above top of rails. Lifting gear cannot be used
oo	R	Fixed end walls over 2 m (6 ft 6 3/4 in) high
p	F, T, U	Loose gravity discharge hopper. Underside of floor ≥70 cm (27 1/2 in) above top of rails. Lifting gear cannot be used
p	I	No slatted floor
p	K, L, S	No sides
p	R	No end wall
pp	F, T, U	Loose gravity discharge hopper. Underside of floor <70 cm (27 1/2 in) above top of rails. Lifting gear cannot be used
pp	K, R	Removable sides
q	all	Electrical heating pipes for all permitted types of power
qq	all	Electrical heating pipes and heating equipment for all permitted types of power
r	all	Steam heating pipes (Note: The index letter could be dropped in 1980, but was sometimes displayed beyond that date.)
rr	all	Steam heating pipes and equipment
r	S	Articulated wagon (Note: The index letter was introduced later than 1980.)
s	all	Permitted in trains up to 100 km/h (62 mph)
ss	all	Permitted in trains up to 120 km/h (75 mph)

=== National index letters ===
==== Country code 50: DR ====
	Classes	Period	Meaning
t	Gbkl, Hkr	1968 to 1979	with special equipment for transporting personnel
u	E, G, K, R	1968 to 1979	not suitable for military use
v	E, T	1968 to 1979	not suitable for loading or unloading with a crane
v	G, H	1968 to 1993	With roof hatches (loading hatches in the roof)
v	U	1980 to 1993	For cement
w	U	1968 to 1979	For liquid fuel
w	Z	1980 to 1993	For liquid fuel
x	Uc	1968 to 1993	For coal dust
x	E	1980 to 1993	With steel floor
y	Uc	1968 to 1979	Chemical container wagon
y	T, U, Z	1980 to 1993	With internal lining
z	K, L, R, S	1968 to 1979	Removable platform railings
z	G, I	1980 to 1993	With steam heating pipes
zz	F	1980 to 1993	With steam heating pipes and equipment

==== Country code 80: DB ====
(Germany)

	Classes	Meaning
t	H	Daberkow transport protection equipment (to 30 April 1994)
t	L	inside loading width at the ends under 2.45 m
tt	H	Lockable partitions (to 30 April 1994)
u	E, F, S	Hydraulic tipping system
u	G, H, I, K, L, T	Steam heating pipes
v	all	Electrical heating pipes for 1,000 or 1,500 volts
vv	all	Electrical heating pipes and heating equipment for 1,000 or 1,500 volts
w	G, H, S	Full spark protection covering
ww	all	Spark protection plate to UIC standard 543
x	E	With steel floor (from 1 January 1994)
z	F	Dumper wagon
z	H	Wagons for Leig-Einheit units
z	T	Wagons used as Td or Tdg
zz	Fb	Bucket wagon

==== Country code 85: SBB ====
(Switzerland)

	Classes	Meaning
t	all	line feeder (10 bar or 1,000 kPa or 150 psi)
u	F	Electro-hydraulic dumping system
u	H	Cooling system
v	all	Electrical heating pipes 1000 V 16 2/3 ~
w	R, S, U	Movable handbrake railings and screw brake spindle (removable/folding)
ww	H	Spark protection plate to UIC standard 543
x	H	2-axled drum brake
x	S, L	ACTS rotating frame
y	H	Insulated
y	F	Smaller loading area (<20 m^{3} or 710 cu ft)
y	R, S	Disc brakes
z	G, H	With 12-core UIC cable

== See also ==
- Austauschbauart
- Union Internationale des Chemins de Fer (UIC)
- UIC identification marking for tractive stock
- UIC classification of locomotive axle arrangements
- UIC classification of railway coaches
- UIC country codes
- Numbering scheme
