= Railway vehicle owner's code =

The railway vehicle owner's code formed part of the vehicle number on the side of a railway coach or wagon. Until 2005 it was used to specify the owner of the wagon. However, the owner code did not necessarily reflect ownership of a vehicle but rather who had the right to use it. Since then the owner code has been replaced by the UIC country code. The keeper of a vehicle is now indicated with a Vehicle Keeper Marking (VKM). The table shows the former numbers used.

Code	Railway company	Abbreviation	Country
10	VR-Yhtymä	VR	Finland
20	Soviet state railway	SŽD	USSR
20*	Rossijskije Železnyje Dorogi	RZD	Russia
21	State railway of Albania	ALB	Albania
21*	Belaruskaja Čyhunka — Беларуская Чыгунка	BČ — БЧ	Belarus
22	Ukrzaliznytsia	UZ	Ukraine
23	Calea Ferată din Moldova	CFM	Moldavia
24	Lietuvos Geležinkeliai	LG	Lithuania
25	Latvijas Dzelzceļš	LDZ	Latvia
26	Eesti Vabariigi Raudtee	EVR	Estonia
27	Qazaqstan Temir Zholy	KTZ	Kazakhstan
28	Sakartwelos Rkinigsa	GR	Georgia
29	Oʻzbekiston Temir Yoʻllari - Ўзбекистон темир йўллари	OTY - ЎTЙ	Uzbekistan
30	Zoesen Chelto	ZC	North Korea
31	Mongolyn Tömör Zam	MTZ - МТЗ	Mongolia
32	Dung Sat Viet-Nam	DSVN	Vietnam
33	Zhong Guo Tie Lu	KNR	China
40	Ferrocarriles de Cuba	FC	Cuba
41	Hekurudha Shqiptare	HSH	Albania
42	Japan Rail	JR	Japan
43	Győr-Sopron-Ebenfurti Vasút	GySEV	Hungary/Austria
44	Budapesti Helyiérdekű Vasút	HEV	Hungary
44*	Željeznice Republike Srpske	ŽRS	Bosnia and Herzegovina
50*	Željeznice Federacije Bosne i Hercegovine	ŽFBH	Bosnia and Herzegovina
50	Deutsche Reichsbahn	DR (DBAG to 1999)	Eastern Germany/Germany
51	Polskie Koleje Państwowe	PKP	Poland
52	Balgarski Darschawni Schelesnizi	BDZ	Bulgaria
53	Căile Ferate Române	CFR	Romania
54	Československé státní dráhy	ČD	Czechoslovakia
54*	České dráhy	ČD	Czech Republic
55	Magyar Államvasutak	MÁV	Hungary
56	Železničná spoločnosť Slovensko	ŽSSK	Slovakia
57	Azərbaycan Dövlət Dəmir Yolu	ADDY	Azerbaijan
59	Kyrgyz Temir Žol - Кыргыз темир жол	KTZ, KRG	Kyrgyzstan
60	Córas Iompair Éireann	CIE	Ireland
61	Chemin de fer d'Anzin	ANZ	France
62	Association of Swiss Private Railways	SP	Switzerland
63	BLS Lötschbergbahn	BLS	Switzerland
64	Ferrovie Nord Milano	FNM	Italia
65	Hydro Transport (formerly Norsk Transportaktieselskab), owner/operator of the Rjukan Line until 1991	RjK; RjB	Norway
65*	Makedonski Železnici	MZ	North Macedonia
66	Compagnie Internationale des Wagons-Lits	CIWL	Belgium
70	British Rail	BR	United Kingdom
71	Red Nacional de los Ferrocarriles Españoles	RENFE	Spain
72	Jugoslovenske Železnice	JŽ	Yugoslavia
72*	Zeleznice Srbije	ZS	Serbia
73	Hellenic Railways Organisation	OSE	Greece
74	Statens Järnvägar	SJ	Sweden
75	Türkiye Cumhuriyeti Devlet Demiryollari	TCDD	Turkey
76	Norges Statsbaner	NSB	Norway
78	Hrvatske Željeznice	HŽ	Croatia
79	Slovenske železnice	SŽ	Slovenia
80	Deutsche Bundesbahn; Deutsche Bahn	DBAG	Germany
81	Österreichische Bundesbahnen	ÖBB	Austria
82	Chemins de fer luxembourgeois	CFL	Luxembourg
83	Ferrovie dello Stato / Trenitalia	FS / TI	Italia
84	Nederlandse Spoorwegen	NS	Netherlands
85	Schweizerische Bundesbahnen; Chemins de Fer Fédéraux; Ferrovie Federali Svizzere	SBB; CFF; FFS	Switzerland
86	Danske Statsbaner	DSB	Denmark
87	Société Nationale des Chemins de fer Français	SNCF	France
88	Nationale Maatschappij der Belgische Spoorwegen; Société Nationale des Chemins de fer Belges	NMBS; SNCB	Belgium
90	Egyptian National Railways	ENR	Egypt
91	Societe Nationale des Chemins de fer Tunisiens	SNCFT	Tunisia
92	Societe Nationale des Transports Ferroviaires	SNTF	Algeria
93	Office National des Chemins de fer du Maroc	ONCFM	Morocco
94	Caminhos de ferro Portugueses	CP	Portugal
95	Israel Railways	IR	Israel
96	Rah Ahan Iran - راه آهن ایران	RAI	Iran
97	Syrian Railways	CFS	Syria
98	Office des Chemins de fer de l'Etat Libanais	CEL	Lebanon
99	Iraqi Railways	IRR	Iraq

*later attribution
