= Rail transport in Bosnia and Herzegovina =

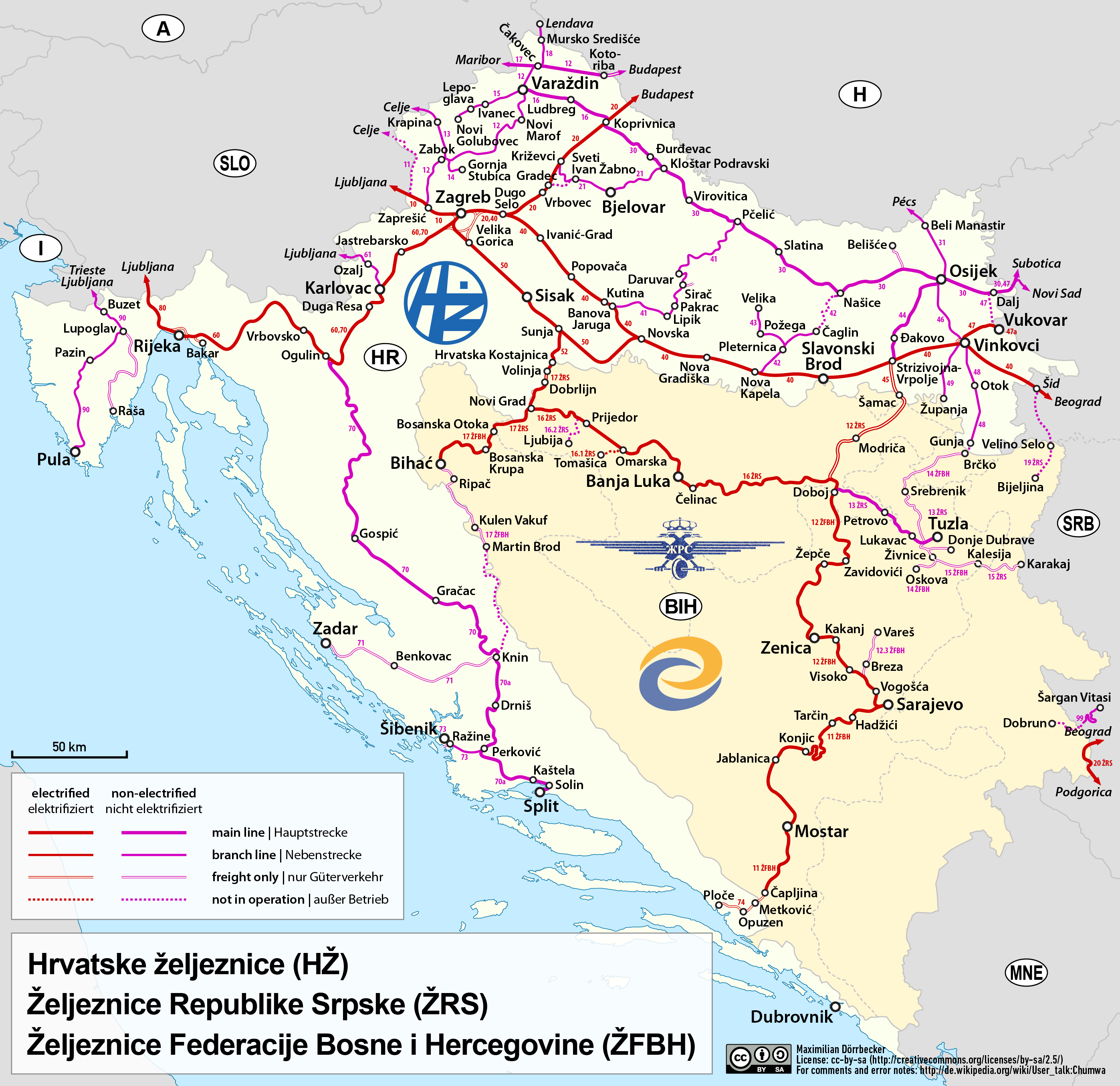
Railway network in Bosnia and Herzegovina and Croatia

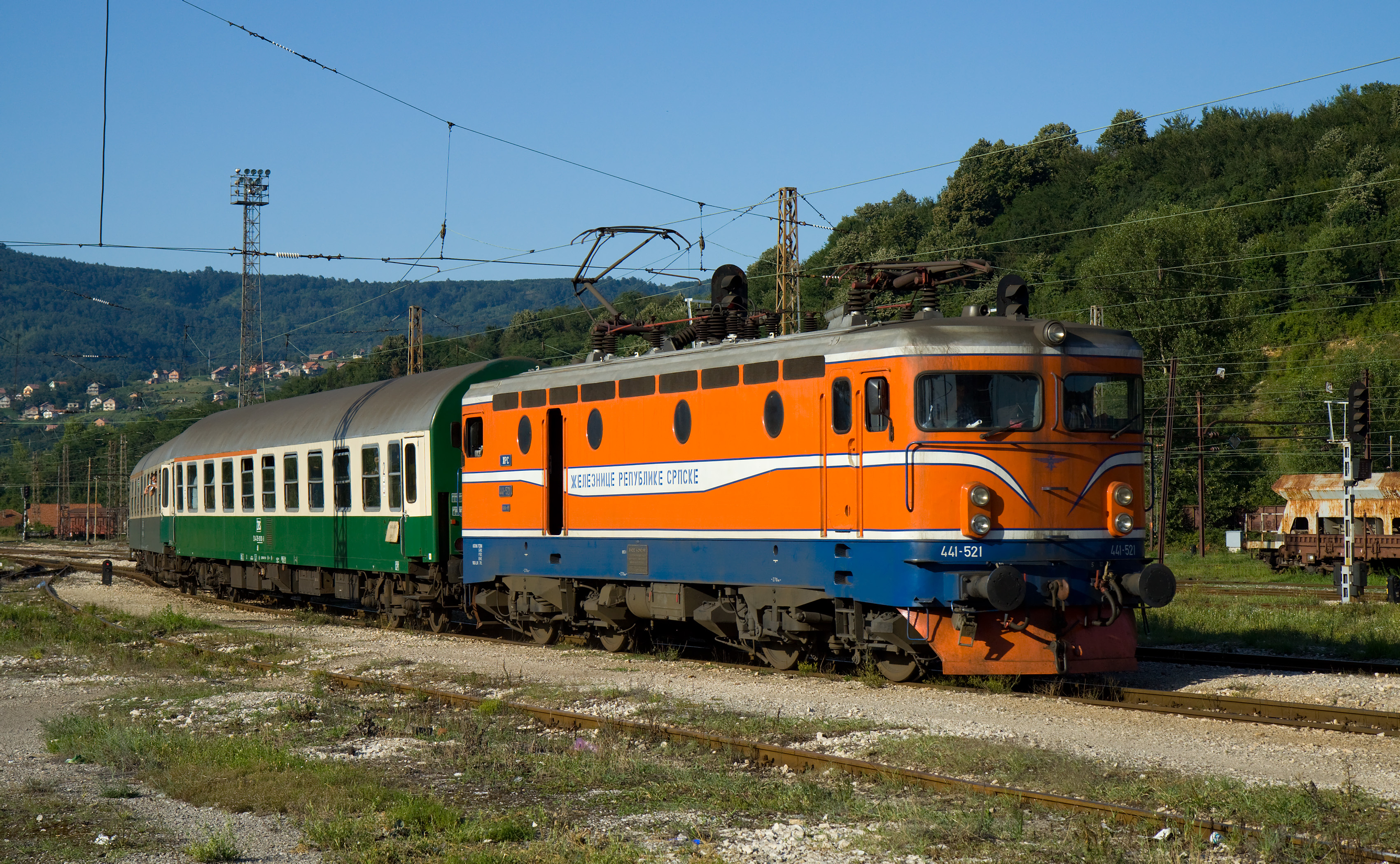
ŽRS local train arriving at Doboj

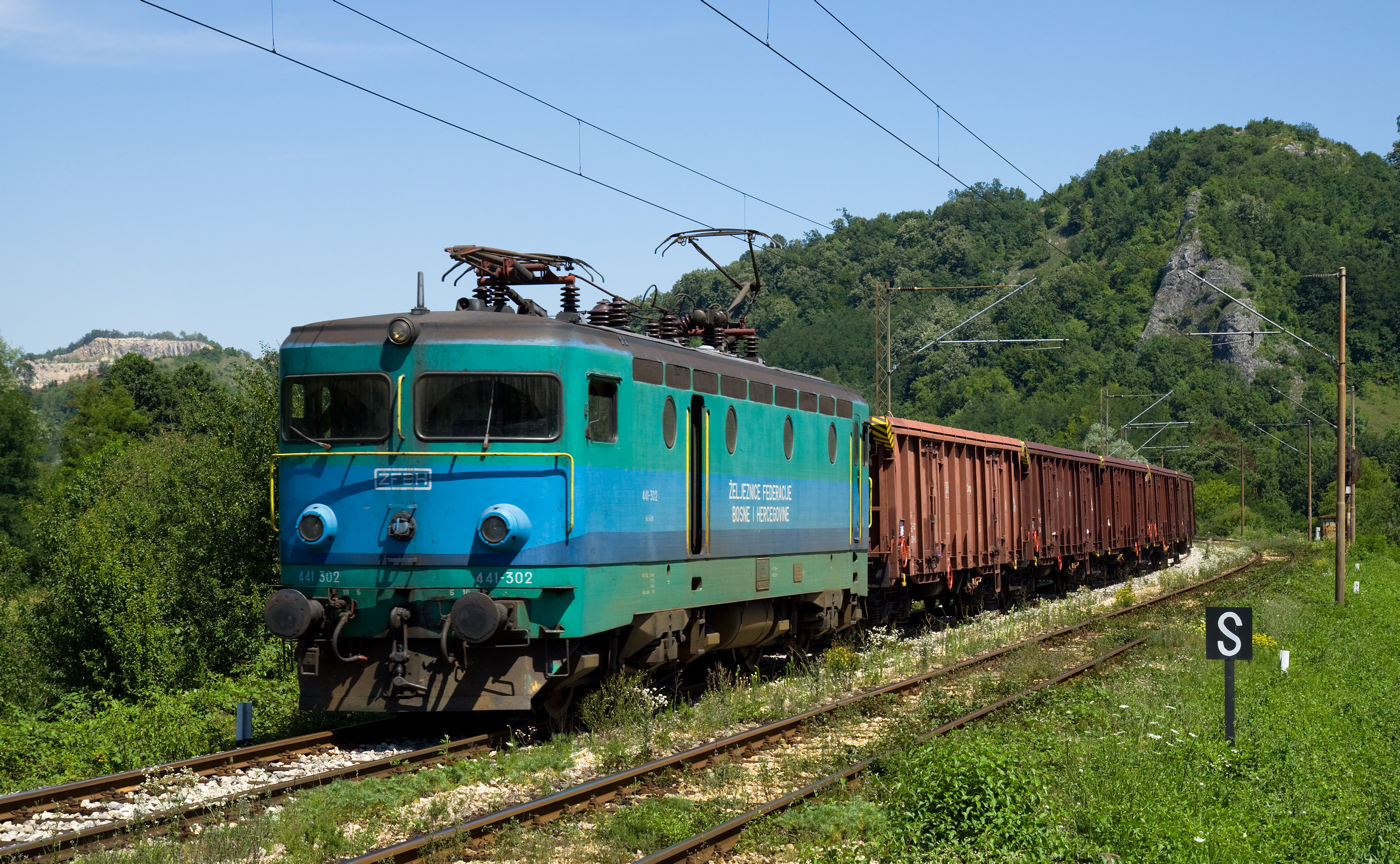
ŽFBH freight train hauled by a class 441 between Doboj and Maglaj

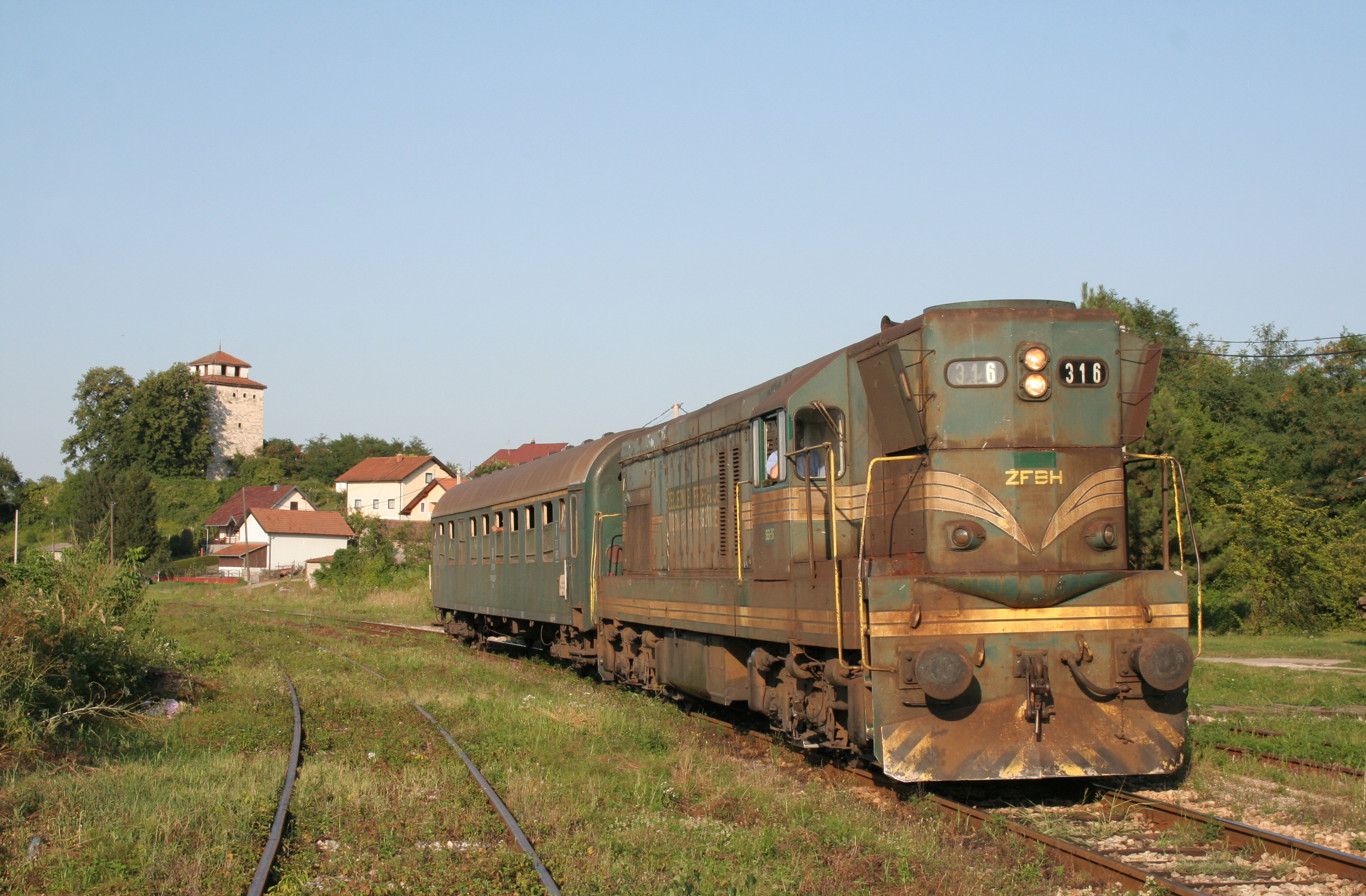
Local train of ŽFBH between Brčko and Tuzla.

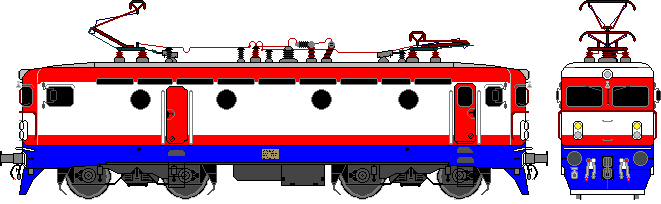
ŽFBIH 441 series locomotive generic livery sketch without any signs

Railway operations in Bosnia and Herzegovina are successors of the Yugoslav Railways within the country boundaries following independence from Yugoslavia in March 1992.

== Overview ==
The two companies operating services (in their respective divisions following the Dayton Agreement) are:

- Railways of Republika Srpska (ŽRS), which operates in Republika Srpska
- Railways of the Federation of Bosnia and Herzegovina (ŽFBH), which operates in the Federation of Bosnia and Herzegovina.

Railways of the Federation of Bosnia and Herzegovina and Railways of Republika Srpska have been members of International Union of Railways (UIC) since 1992 and 1998, respectively. They were assigned separate UIC Country Code, 44 for the Republika Srpska and 50 for the Federation of Bosnia and Herzegovina. The new code for Bosnia and Herzegovina is 49.

== History ==
The railway system in Bosnia and Herzegovina during the Austro-Hungarian period was shaped by military, economic, and strategic considerations. Following the Austro-Hungarian occupation of Bosnia and Herzegovina in 1878, the region's railways were developed under the jurisdiction of the Ministry of War. The first railway in Bosnia and Herzegovina was a normal-gauge line between Dobrljin and Banja Luka, completed in 1873. It was initially part of the planned Oriental Railway project, which was later abandoned in 1875.

After the occupation, all subsequent railways were built as narrow-gauge lines (0.76 m), making Bosnia and Herzegovina the only country in Europe with an exclusively narrow-gauge railway network by 1914. The first narrow-gauge railway was the Bosanski Brod–Doboj–Zenica line, constructed in 1879 by the Bavarian company Hügel & Sager. This railway was initially designed as a temporary military line using materials readily available in the company’s storage in Romania. Upon completion, the line was opened for civilian use in passenger and goods transport. The railways were financed primarily by Bosnia and Herzegovina itself, with Austria-Hungary providing loans secured by the exploitation of the region’s natural resources, particularly timber. In 1895, the Bosnian State Railways was established, centralizing administration under the Ministry of Finance. In 1895, the Bosnian State Railways adopted Serbo-Croatian as its official language.

== See also ==
- Narrow-gauge railways in Bosnia and Herzegovina
- Sarajevo Tramway
- Transport in Bosnia and Herzegovina
