= List of UIC country codes =

Identifies active members of the International Union of Railways

The UIC Country Code is a two digit-number identifying countries in which members of the International Union of Railways (UIC) are active. The UIC has issued numbering systems for rolling stock (UIC wagon numbers) and stations that include the country code. The values are defined in UIC leaflet 920–14.

The country code had originally been designed as a company code but mainly as a consequence of the reorganisation of the rail sector in Europe changes were necessary. When the former UIC vehicle number became a vehicle register number (European Vehicle Number, EVN) issued by governmental organisations, the code was attributed to the countries. Vehicle numbering is now governed by the Intergovernmental Organisation for International Carriage by Rail and in Technical Specifications for Interoperability (TSI) of the European Union.

Railroads in North America use a system based on company-specific reporting marks, and a similar system, ISO 6346, is used for intermodal containers.

== Table of codes ==
Numerical code	Alphabetical code	Country
10	FI	Finland
20	RU	Russia
21	BY	Belarus
22	UA	Ukraine
23	MD	Moldova
24	LT	Lithuania
25	LV	Latvia
26	EE	Estonia
27	KZ	Kazakhstan
28	GE	Georgia
29	UZ	Uzbekistan
30	KP	North Korea
31	MN	Mongolia
32	VN	Vietnam
33	CN	China
34	LA	Laos
40	CU	Cuba
41	AL	Albania
42	JP	Japan
44	BA	Bosnia and Herzegovina, Serb Republic of (Note: To allow the country to join the international seat reservation system, the individual code has been deprecated in favour of the single code for the whole country. The old code may still be used on existing applications .)
49	BA	Bosnia and Herzegovina
50	BA	Bosnia and Herzegovina, Muslim-Croat Federation of
51	PL	Poland
52	BG	Bulgaria
53	RO	Romania
54	CZ	Czech Republic
55	HU	Hungary
56	SK	Slovakia
57	AZ	Azerbaijan
58	AM	Armenia
59	KG	Kyrgyzstan
60	IE	Ireland
61	KR	South Korea
62	ME	Montenegro
65	MK	North Macedonia
66	TJ	Tajikistan
67	TM	Turkmenistan
68	AF	Afghanistan
70	GB	United Kingdom
71	ES	Spain
72	RS	Serbia
73	GR	Greece
74	SE	Sweden
75	TR	Turkey
76	NO	Norway
78	HR	Croatia
79	SI	Slovenia
80	DE	Germany
81	AT	Austria
82	LU	Luxembourg
83	IT	Italy
84	NL	Netherlands
85	CH	Switzerland
86	DK	Denmark
87	FR	France
88	BE	Belgium
89	TZ	Tanzania
90	EG	Egypt
91	TN	Tunisia
92	DZ	Algeria
93	MA	Morocco
94	PT	Portugal
95	IL	Israel
96	IR	Iran
97	SY	Syria
98	LB	Lebanon
99	IQ	Iraq
n/a (Note: The 920-14 leaflet contains a placeholder entry for the country but assigns no numerical code to it.)	AU	Australia
n/a	CA	Canada
n/a	CD	DR Congo
n/a	ZA	South Africa
n/a	US	United States
