= List of rail accidents in Yugoslavia =

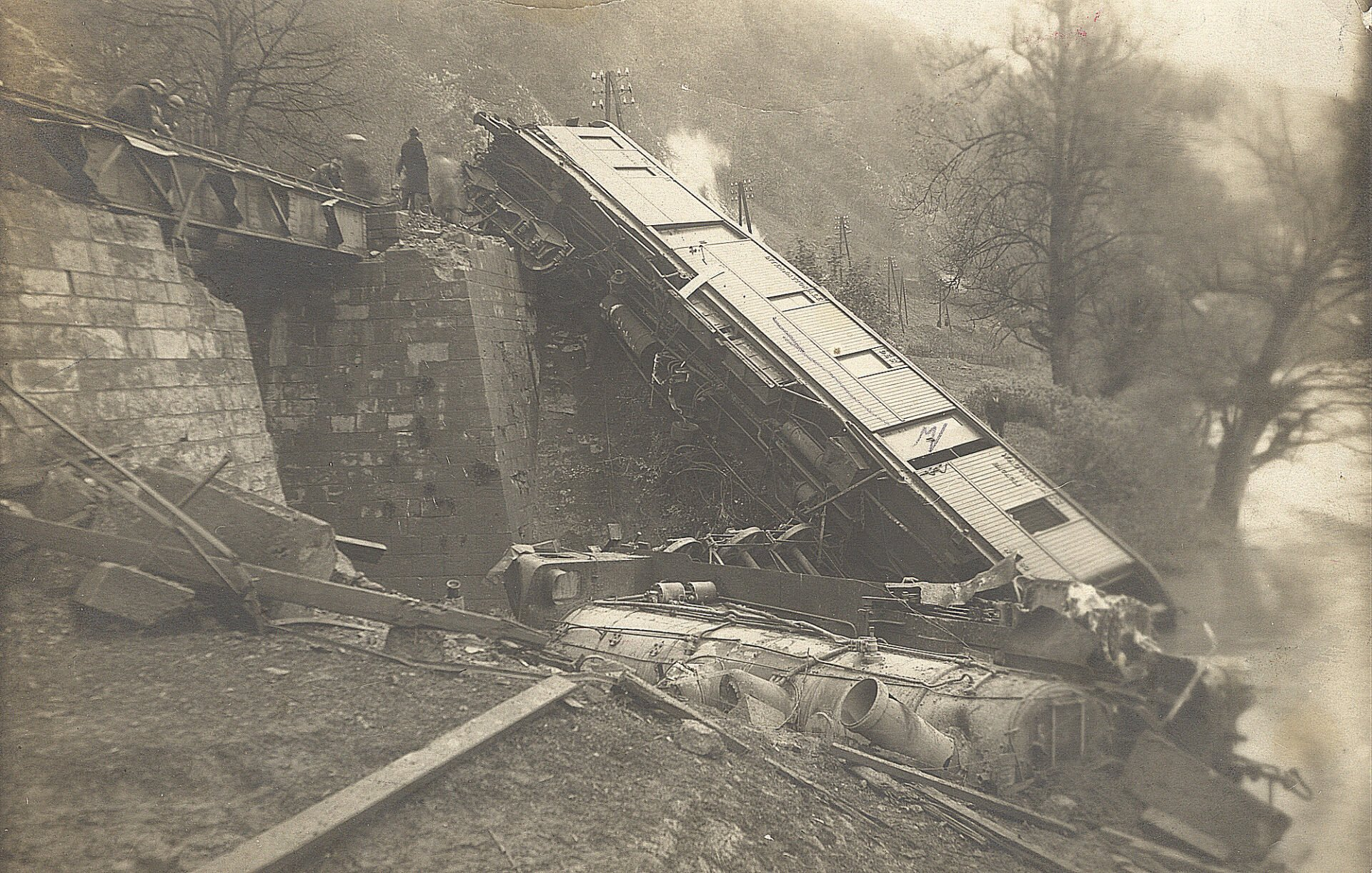
3 November 1929 Rajhenburg train crash

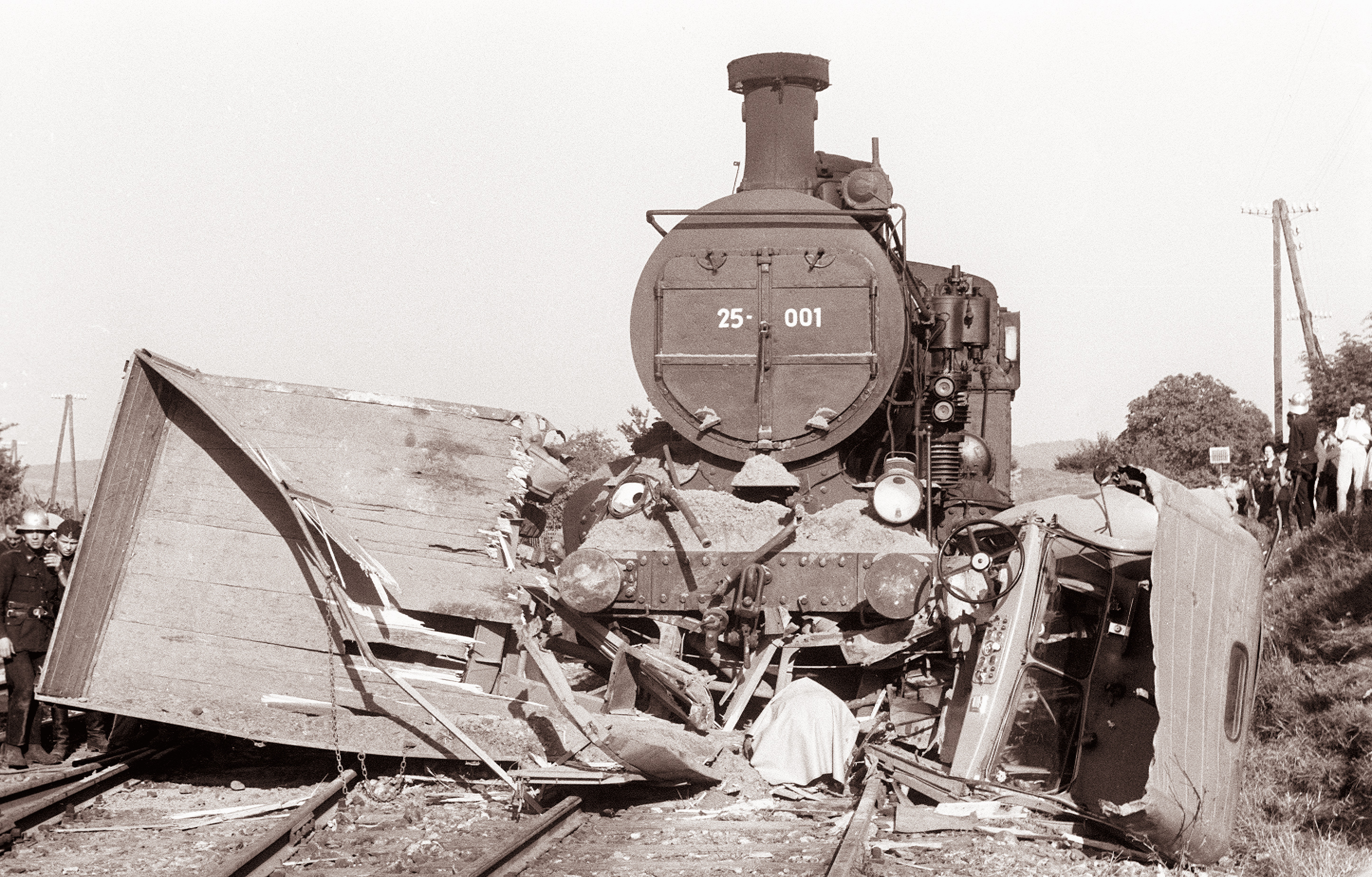
12 July 1961 train-truck collision in Maribor

This is a list of rail accidents in Yugoslavia.

== List ==
Accident	Date	Killed	Injured	Description
Sevnica train disaster	12 April 1919	13	90	An explosion in the Ljubljana-Zagreb passenger train caused a fire near the Sevnica train station. Three cars were completely burned. 13 passengers were killed and 90 injured. According to some sources, the explosion was staged as part of a train robbery.
Vranovci train derailment	1 October 1920	5	14	A special military train carrying soldiers derailed on the Gostivar-Tetovo line near Vranovci, killing three and severely injuring seven people, two of whom died later. Nine persons were lightly injured.
Batajnica train crash	13 January 1922	2	16	Passenger train from Subotica collided with a mixed train in the Batajnica railway station. Two passengers were killed and 16 more injured.
Voganj train crash	8 August 1922	3	9	A passenger train collided with a freight train near the Voganj railway station. Three people were killed and nine injured.
Stalać tunnel train crash	23 August 1922	1	3	Two freight trains collided inside a tunnel near Stalać. One train stoker was killed and three more people injured.
Zemun train crash	2 November 1923	2	20	Fast train from Zagreb collided with the passenger train Belgrade-Subotica near the Zemunski Obori railway station. Two soldiers were killed and 20 more people injured.
Prahovo train crash	21 May 1924	1	1	Passenger train Negotin-Prahovo crashed into a mixed train within the Prahovo station. One passenger was killed and one conductor heavily wounded.
Subotica train derailment	16 January 1925	3	?	Passenger train Novi Sad-Subotica partially derailed while entering the Šomšićevo train station in Subotica. Three passengers were killed and several more injured.
Boiler explosion near Čoka	23 December 1925	2	0	Boiler exploded on a freight train traveling between Čoka and Potiski Sveti Nikola. Both the driver and the stoker were killed.
Murska Sobota derailment	9 January 1926	1	1	One passenger was killed and one brakeman injured when the passenger train Murska Sobota-Hodoš derailed between the Gornja Lendava and Mačkovci stations.
Voganj train crash	3 August 1926	2	?	Fast passenger train Belgrade–Zagreb crashed into a freight train inside the Voganj railway station. Two people were killed, a stoker of the passenger train and one worker in the freight train.
Ugljevik train accident	30 October 1926	2	3	Two rail workers were killed and three more injured when a freight train derailed and fell from the embankment between the Ugljevik and Modran stations on the Bosanska Rača–Ugljevik line.
Ečka train accident	1 November 1926	2	0	A passenger train bound to Veliki Bečkerek collided with a rail push trolley at the Ečka train station. Two railway workers in the trolley were killed.
Perković train crash	27 May 1927	1	4	Fast passenger train Split–Zagreb collided with a freight train between the Perković and Unešić stations, about 4km from Perković. Driver of the passenger train was killed. Four persons in the freight train were injured.
Trubarevo train crash	10 August 1927	2	8	Two freight trains collided on the Belgrade–Niš railway between the Đunis and Braljina stations, near Trubarevo. The driver and the train master were killed, while eight other were injured.
Konjic train accident	26 October 1927	2	2	A freight train derailed while crossing a bridge between the Bradina and Brđani stations (near Konjic). Eight cars fell into the river.
Čoka train derailment	3 May 1928	5	6	Passenger train Subotica-Đala derailed in the Čoka train station killing five and injuring six passengers.
Lajkovac train crash	11 October 1928	1	12	Fast passenger train coming from Valjevo collided with another fast passenger train coming from Belgrade, within the Lajkovac station. One conductor was killed and 12-13 people injured.
Careva Ćuprija train crash	29 November 1928	1	~18	A freight train coming from Belgrade main station collided with a passenger train coming from Požarevac, at Careva Ćuprija. One passenger was killed, three heavily injured, and 10-15 lightly injured.
Batajnica train crash	11 February 1929	1	19	A passenger train collided with a freight train on the rail line between Batajnica and Zemun Polje railway stations. One train master was killed and several other people injured.
Rajhenburg train crash	3 November 1929	3	2	Passenger train Orient Express traveling from Zagreb to Zidani Most crashed into a freight train inside the Rajhenburg station. The locomotive and the mail car of the passenger train fell into the river. Three people were killed (all three in the freight train) and two wounded (driver and conductor of the passenger train). Train dispatcher at the Rajhenburg station, who was responsible for the crash, attempted suicide but survived.
Alibunar train crash	22 December 1929	1	1	A snowplow train crashed into another train within the Alibunar station, and then derailed. The driver was killed and stoker injured.
Celje train-bus collision	10 December 1931	8	10	Eight people were killed and ten injured when a train collided with a bus at a level crossing near Celje.
Aričićevo train crash	25 October 1935	4	7	Fast train crashed into a freight train within the Aričićevo station, on the Niš–Belgrade railway. Three people were killed and seven injured.
Drvar train derailment	29 October 1936	4	2	Four brakemen were killed and two more injured when eight freight wagons derailed and fell down an embankment near the Drvar train station.
Klačevica train accident	14 May 1937	4	9	Four people were killed and nine injured when a locomotive of a mixed train derailed near the Klačevica station on the Zaječar-Paraćin line.
Kraljevo train crash	15 July 1937	1	3	Two passenger trains collided within the Kraljevo railway station. One rail worker was killed and three passengers injured.
Ivanjska train crash	24 September 1939	9	24	18 wagons separated from a freight train in the Ivanjska station (near Banja Luka) and rolled down the track out of control, crashing into the Prijedor-Banja Luka passenger train. Nine people were killed and 24 injured, all in the freight wagons.
Ozalj train accident	17 March 1940	18	30	Passenger train Karlovac-Ljubljana ran onto a rockfall, derailed and fell into Kupa river near Ozalj. 18 people were killed and around 30 were injured. One body was never recovered from the river.
Partisan attack on a train near Bosanski Novi	2 November 1943	60	60	Yugoslav Partisans blew up a German military train carrying German soldiers, between Dobrljin and Bosanski Novi. Three cars were destroyed and locomotive damaged. According to the Partisan sources, 60 Germans were killed and 60 wounded.
Donja Dubrava train derailment	13 August 1947	2	14	Passenger train Osijek-Zagreb derailed near the Čulinec station in Donja Dubrava, Zagreb. Two passengers were killed and 14 injured.
Uroševac train accident	5-6 July 1948	21	11	Passenger train collided with a freight train between the stations of Uroševac and Grlica. One car was crashed. 21 people were killed and 11 injured.
Bačinci train derailment	6 September 1948	3	24	Fast train bound to Sarajevo derailed while entering the Bačinci station, due to excessive speed. Three people were killed, 24 sustained injuries.
Sveti Petar u Šumi train accident	5 August 1949	15	17	Fifteen children were killed and 17 injured when a passenger train carrying war orphans from Belgrade and Zagreb derailed in the Sveti Petar u Šumi train station.
Rakovica train-tram crash	9 November 1950	1	2	A freight train collided with a tram at a crossing in Rakovica. One tram passenger was killed and two more injured.
Slakovci train crash	28 April 1951	6	26	Two trains collided in the Slakovci railway station killing 6 people (one police officer and five convicts en route to Sremska Mitrovica Prison).
Vinkovci train disaster	6 November 1951	17	32	Two passenger trains collided in the Vinkovci railway station. 17 people were killed and 32 injured, most of them political prisoners en route to the Goli Otok prison.
Mojstrana train accident	12 November 1951	1	3	Train carrying workers to Jesenice fell into the river when the bridge collapsed near Mojstrana.
Visoko train crash	21 December 1952	13	15	Fast train from Zagreb collided with the freight train from Visoko between the Visoko and Dobrinja stations. 13 people were killed and 15 injured.
Karlovac train crash	7 July 1953	4	26	Fast passenger train Split-Zagreb collided with the local train Karlovac-Ogulin in the Mrzlo Polje station near Karlovac. Four people were killed and 26 injured.
Zagreb train explosion	19 January 1954	2	0	Two railway workers (a driver and a stoker) were killed when a boiler exploded on the Tauern-Express international train in the Zagreb Zapadni railway station.
Zenica tran-truck collision	29 January 1954	8	9	Eight workers were killed and nine injured when a train collided with a truck on a level crossing near Zenica.
Zagreb tram accident	31 October 1954	19	37	In Zagreb, a tram lost control during descent and crashed on Mirogoj Road, a steep road leading from Medveščak Street to Mirogoj Cemetery. 19 passengers were killed, while 37 were injured.
Leskovac train crash	10 April 1957	2	0	Two railway workers (a driver and his assistant) were killed when two freight trains collided in the Pečenjevce train station.
Zagreb train crash	5 December 1957	5	20	Passenger train from Split collided with a freight train carrying gas tanks. The collision happened within the city of Zagreb. Two tanks exploded. Five people were killed and 20 injured.
Jablanica train accident	19 February 1958	2	15	Passenger train Titograd-Sarajevo ran onto a rockfall, derailed and fell into Neretva river near Jablanica. Two passengers drowned while 15 were injured.
Banja Luka train disaster	27 August 1959	12	37	Passenger train Sarajevo-Zagreb derailed and then fell into the river near the Zalužani train station. 12 people were killed and 37 injured.
Martin Brod train crash	25 August 1960	6	18	Fast passenger train arriving from Knin collided with a freight train in the Martin Brod train station. Six people were killed and 18 injured.
Bosanski Novi train accident	22 October 1960	1	4	One person (driver of the freight train) was killed and four passengers injured when a local passenger train collided with a freight train near Bosanski Novi.
Maribor train-truck collision	12 July 1961	2	0	Truck driver and his passenger were killed when their truck was struck by a freight train near the Tržaška street in Maribor.
Beška train crash	23 August 1961	15	56	Passenger train from Subotica collided with a freight train in the Beška train station. 15 people were killed and more than 50 injured.
Lapovo train crash	18 November 1961	1	5	A freight train crashed into a local passenger train between the goods and passenger stations in Lapovo. Driver of the passenger train was killed and five more people injured.
Kumanovo train disaster	5 November 1962	25	19	Passenger train Belgrade-Skopje derailed in the Tabanovce train station (near Kumanovo). 25 people were killed and 19 injured.
Knin train accident	3 December 1962	4	0	Four railway workers were killed when a freight train fell from a viaduct near Oton due to strong winds.
Čakovec train crash	18 December 1963	2	33	Two persons were killed and 33 injured when a passenger train collided with a freight train in the Čakovec train station.
Križanec train-bus collision	19 December 1963	2	10+	Two workers were killed and more than 10 injured when a freight train collided with a bus full of workers on a level crossing in Križanec near Varaždin.
Jajinci train disaster	4 January 1964	62	300	62 persons were killed when the local train from Požarevac collided with the fast train Skopje-Belgrade near the Jajinci railway station.
Miravci train accident	30 July 1964	2	2	A train driver and a stoker were killed and two more railway workers injured when two freight trains collided near the Miravci train station (near Gevgelija).
Doboj train crash	20 October 1964	3	12	Passenger train Tuzla-Doboj collided with a locomotive between Doboj Novi and Bosansko Suho Polje stations near Doboj. Three people were killed and 12 injured.
	27 April 1965	4	8	Four passengers were killed and eight seriously wounded when two passenger cars derailed between the Šnjegotina and Ukrina stations on the Banja Luka–Doboj railway.
Džumajlija train-truck crash	22 October 1965	5	14	Five people were killed and 14 injured when an interurban train collided with a truck at a level crossing in Džumajlija (between Titov Veles and Štip).
Zidani Most train crash	29 November 1965	8	12	Passenger train from Maribor collided with a freight train within the Zidani Most railway station. Eight people were killed and 12 injured.
Šaš train crash	9 January 1966	5	10	Fast train Split-Belgrade collided with a freight train in the Šaš train station (near Sunja). Five people were killed and 10 injured.
Kaštel Stari train disaster	16 February 1966	29	27	After a failure, a passenger train went out of control and collided with a mixed train near the Kaštel Stari train station. 29 people were killed and 27 injured.
Futog train accident	13 May 1967	9	13	Nine people were killed and 12 injured when a train collided with a tractor at a level crossing near Futog (all victims were in the tractor trailer).
Demir Kapija train accident	22 July 1967	2	0	Two railway workers (a driver and his assistant) were killed when two freight trains collided in the Demir Kapija train station.
Ristovac train accident	13 May 1968	1	28	One person was killed and 28 wounded when an express international train Paris-Athens collided with a freight train within the Ristovac train station.
Vrpolje train accident	20 June 1968	1	5	Driver's assistant was killed and five other wounded when a freight train collided with a fast passenger train in the Vrpolje train station.
Hrastnik train accident	30 August 1968	1	3	One railway worker was killed and three injured when their freight train collided with a rail push trolley near the Hrastnik train station.
Batajnica train crash	27 March 1969	4	20	Fast passenger train coming from Sarajevo collided with a freight train in the Batajnica railway station. Four people were killed and 20 more injured.
Podvis train crash	11 April 1969	2	1	Two freight trains collided inside a tunnel near Podvis on the Niš-Zaječar rail line. Two brakemen were killed and a stoker was injured.
Badovina train disaster	30 July 1969	29	17	Interurban train collided with three runaway wagons of a freight train on the Tetovo-Gostivar railway near the Badovina station. 29 people were killed and 17 injured,
Okučani train disaster	25 October 1969	11	60	Express train Belgrade-Zagreb collided head-on with a freight train in the Okučani railway station. Eleven people were killed and around 40 injured.
Preserje train derailment	21 August 1970	2	10	Fast passenger train coming from Roma Termini railway station derailed while passing through the Preserje station near Ljubljana. Two people were killed (a passenger and a conductor) and 10 injured.
Vranduk train disaster	14 February 1971	33	117	Local train carrying factory workers and miners on the Žepče-Zenica line caught fire while passing through the Vranduk tunnel. 33 people were killed and 117 injured.
Semizovac train disaster	17 July 1971	15	7	A passenger train on the Belgrade-Ploče line collided with a freight train in the Semizovac train station. Passenger train was carrying elementary school students from Kragujevac and Stragari. 15 people (14 student and one teacher) were killed and 7 injured.
Vrčin train disaster	4 August 1971	39	73	Interurban train Belgare-Požarevac collided with a freight train between the Kasapovac and Lipe stations near Vrčin. 39 people were killed and 73 injured.
Ivanić-Grad train derailment	15 April 1972	4	82	International passenger train (Orient Express) derailed near the Deanovec train station (near Ivanić-Grad). Four passenger was killed and 82 injured.
Dugo Selo train crash	16 May 1972	8	1+	Passenger train Zagreb-Koprivnica partly derailed and then collided with a freight train in the Prikraj train station near Dugo Selo. Eight people were killed
Novi Marof train-truck crash	13 September 1972	5	50	A passenger train collided with a truck at a level crossing near the Podrute train station in Novi Marof (near Varaždin). Five people were killed and 50 injured.
Velika Plana train accident	28 April 1973	3	5	Fast train Kosovo Polje-Belgrade ran into a group of passengers who were disembarking from the passenger train Belgrade-Niš in the Velika Plana train station. Three people were killed and five injured.
Perković train accidents	28 August 1973	5	31	Two accidents happened in the time-span of 6 minutes. First, business train from Split collided with a diesel locomotive in the Perković train station, injuring 18 people. Six minutes later, fast passenger train Split-Novi Sad collided with a freight train between the Perković and Primorski Dolac stations, killing five and injuring 13.
Nomenj train crash	22 January 1974	5	29	Two trains collided on the Jesenice-Nova Gorica rail line, between the Soteska and Nomenj stations. Five people were killed and 29 injured.
Ovčari train crash	11 February 1974	5	7	Local passenger train collided with a freight train between the Ovčari and Grad stations near Konjic. Five person were killed and seven injured.
Vrpolje train crash	19 August 1974	4	1	Four railway workers were killed and one lightly injured when two freight trains collided near the Vrpolje train station.
Zagreb train disaster	30 August 1974	153	60	An express train (number 10410) traveling from Belgrade to Dortmund, derailed before entering Zagreb Main Station, killing 153 people. It was the worst rail accident in Yugoslavia and remains one of the worst in Europe's history.
Vranje train disaster	15 May 1975	13	168	A bridge collapsed while the fast passenger train Skopje-Belgrade was passing over it, in Mazarać near Vranje. The locomotive and six cars crossed the bridge, but the seventh car fell off from the bridge into the river. 13 people were killed and 168 injured.
Zrenjanin train accident	16 July 1975	1	30	One railway worker was killed and 30 people injured when a local passenger train collided with a freight train in Zrenjanin at a goods station.
Zemun train disaster	19 July 1975	16	38	Business train on the Belgrade-Sarajevo line collided with the passenger train Belgrade-Vinkovci in the Zemun Novi Grad train station. 16 passengers were killed and 38 injured.
Brčko train accident	13 September 1975	1	1	A stoker of a switcher locomotive was killed and driver injured when their locomotive collided with a freight train in the Brčko Novo train station.
Preserje train crash	20 September 1976	18	39	A passenger train and an express train (Direct Orient Express) collided head-on on the Ljubljana-Postojna rail line, between the stations of Preserje and Notranje Gorice. 18 people were killed.
Teovo train derailment	24 December 1978	1	18	One passenger was killed and 18 injured when the interurban train Bitola-Skopje derailed near the Teovo train station.
Stalać rail crash	13 September 1979	62	106	A head-on collision occurred on a single-track section of the railway near the village of Stalać. The crash involved a packed Express passenger train bound for Skopje and an intermodal freight train . 62 people were killed and 106 injured.
Ćićevac train-bus collision	18 November 1979	8	10	Eight people were killed and ten injured (all in the bus) when business train Belgrade-Skopje collided with a bus at a level crossing in Ćićevac.
Ćuprija train accident	12 January 1980	2	3	Local passenger train Lapovo-Stalać ran out of control, broke through a bumper block and fell into an abyss near Ćuprija. Two railway workers (a driver and a stoker) were killed and three passengers injured.
Celje train accident	4 June 1980	2	0	A train driver and his assistant were killed when their freight train collided with another train in the Celje railway station.
Podvran train crash	13 December 1980	23	10	A passenger train collided with a freight train near the village of Podvran between Bosanska Krupa and Bosanska Otoka. 23 people were killed and 10 injured.
Stevanac train disaster	22 March 1981	40	30	Two cars of the Niš-Belgrade fast passenger train derailed when a retaining wall collapsed and caused a landslide between the Braljina and Stevanac stations. 40 people were killed and around 30 injured.
Sremska Mitrovica train crash	26 September 1982	1	1	One person was killed (a train driver) and one injured when four freight trans collided in the Sremska Mitrovica railway station.
Duševići train derailment	17 January 1983	3	32	Three cars of the passenger train Kosovo Polje-Peć derailed near the village of Duševići. Three people were killed and 32 injured.
Borovnica train crash	21 January 1983	1	1	One train driver was killed and another injured when their two freight trains collided in the Borovnica train station.
Metković train crash	10 Mar 1983	2	8	Fast passenger train collided with a freight train on the Sarajevo-Kardeljevo rail line between the Metković and Opuzen stations. The driver and the waiter of the fast train were killed, while 8 passengers were injured, three of them severely.
Zagreb train crash	15 December 1983	2	9	Two train drivers were killed when their interurban train collided with a freight train in Zagreb.
Divača train disaster	14 July 1984	31	47	A freight train violated signals and crashed into a stationary express en route from Belgrade to Koper and Pula in the Divača railway station, killing 31 people and injuring 47.
Zlatibor train crash	25 January 1985	7	25	A passenger train on the Belgrade–Bar railway ran onto a rock fall, ran out of control a crashed into a tunnel. Seven people were killed and 25 injured.
Titova Mitrovica train accident	17 December 1985	2	1	A train ran into a group of workers at a level crossing in Titova Mitrovica. Two workers were killed and one injured.
Aleksa Šantić train-bus crash	14 November 1986	8	1	Eight people were killed and one injured when passenger train Subotica-Vinkovci collided with a bus at a level crossing in Aleksa Šantić.
Ovčari train accident	27 August 1987	3	16	Local passenger train Sarajevo-Kardeljevo ran onto a landslide, derailed and crashed into a tunnel near the Ovčari train station. The driver and two passengers were killed.
Rogljevo train crash	17 October 1987	11	50	A freight train collided with an interurban train near Rogljevo on the Negotin-Zaječar line. Eleven people were killed and 50 injured.
Glogovac train-bus crash	10 December 1987	8	48	Passenger train Kosovo Polje-Peć collided with a bus at a level crossing in Nekovce near Glogovac. Eight people (all in the bus) were killed and 48 injured.
Barajevo train accident	30 May 1988	3	1	Three railway workers were killed and one injured when a freight train collided with a locomotive near Boždarevac (near Barajevo) on the Belgrade-Bar railway.
Knin train crash	22 September 1988	2	6	A freight train collided with two electric locomotives and caught fire on a railway between Kninsko Polje and Vrpolje stations. Train driver and his assistant were killed.
Lapovo train disaster	9 October 1988	33	16	Two cars of the business train Skopje-Belgrade derailed in the Lapovo train station and collided with a freight locomotive. 33 people were killed and 16 injured.
Putinci train-truck collision	5 January 1989	6	33	International passenger train Frankfurt-Belgrade collided with a truck at a level crossing in Putinci (near Ruma). Six people were killed and 33 injured.
Nekodim train derailment	7 June 1992	4	6	The last of three cars of the passenger train Kosovo Polje-Skopje derailed near Nekodim (Uroševac municipality). Four passengers were killed (three of them being children) and six more injured.
Belgrade tunnel crash	5 Nov 1992	2	12	Suburban train Resnik-Batajnica collided with the Belgrade-Šid passenger train within the Bežanija tunnel near the Zemun railway station. One passenger and the driver of the suburban train were killed. 12 people were injured.
Kačanik train crash	17 Oct 1995	1	5	A railbus collided with a freight train near Kačanik on the Kosovo Polje-Đeneral Janković rail line. One conductor was killed, while another conductor, driver's assistant and three passengers were injured.

== See also ==
- List of rail accidents
- List of rail accidents by country
- Grdelica train bombing
- Bioče derailment
- Rudine derailment

== Sources ==
- Semmens, Peter (1994). Railway Disasters of the World: Principal Passenger Train Accidents of the 20th Century. Patrick Stephens Ltd. ISBN 1-85260-323-2.
