= Vranovci =

Vranovci may refer to:

- Vranovci, Croatia, a village near Bukovlje
- Vranovci, Vrapčište, a village in North Macedonia
