= Trubarevo =

Trubarevo may refer to:

- Trubarevo, Gazi Baba, North Macedonia
- Trubarevo (Ćićevac), Serbia
