= Kamnik (disambiguation) =

Kamnik is a town in northern Slovenia.

Kamnik may also refer to:

== Places ==
- Municipality of Kamnik, a municipality in northern Slovenia. The seat of the municipality is the town of Kamnik
- Kamnik–Savinja Alps, a mountain range of the Southern Limestone Alps. They lie in northern Slovenia, except for the northernmost part, which lies in Austria
- Kamnik pod Krimom, a village in the Municipality of Brezovica in central Slovenia
- Kamnik Bistrica, an Alpine river in northern Slovenia, a left tributary of the Sava River

== Sports ==
- NK Kamnik, a Slovenian football club from Kamnik
- NK Stol Virtus, a Slovenian football club from Kamnik, sometimes known as NK Stol Kamnik

== Others ==
- Kamnik Saddle Lodge, a mountain hostel located just below Kamnik Saddle
