= Braljina =

Braljina may refer to:

- Braljina (Ćićevac), a village in Serbia
- Braljina (Ražanj), a village in Serbia
