= Stalać rail crash =

1979 train collision in Yugoslavia

- Location within Yugoslavia

Details
- Date: 13 September 1979; 1:33 CET (0:33 UTC)
- Location: Stalać, Serbia
- Coordinates: 43°40′46″N 21°24′52″E
- Country: Yugoslavia
- Line: Belgrade–Niš mainline
- Operator: Yugoslav Railways
- Incident type: Head-on collision
- Cause: Freight train driver allowed train to pass signals at danger

Statistics
- Trains: 2
- Passengers: ?
- Deaths: 62
- Injured: 106

On 13 September 1979, a crash occurred between two trains near the village of Stalać in SR Serbia, then part of Yugoslavia. The crash involved a head-on collision between a packed express passenger train bound for Skopje and an intermodal freight train on a single-track section of the railway. Due to communication errors and possible driver fatigue, the two trains collided, resulting in 62 fatalities and 106 injuries. The crash remains one of the more significant rail accidents in former Yugoslavia, though not widely documented. The driver of the freight train and his assistant were blamed for the accident and sentenced to 20 and 15 years, respectively.

== Background ==
Stalać is located along a key rail line connecting several major regions within Serbia. In 1979, Yugoslav Railways handled high volumes of both passenger and freight transport, often on single-track sections like the one near Stalać. Single-track operation required careful coordination between dispatchers and train operators to avoid conflicts. At the time, the communication and signalling protocols in place were more limited than those found in modern rail systems, which sometimes increased operational risks, particularly in remote or rural areas.

== Collision ==
At 1:33 AM local time on 13 September 1979, a passenger train traveling south encountered a freight train traveling north on the same track near Stalać. The freight train, transporting containerized goods, was heavier and slower to stop than the passenger train. A miscommunication regarding track priority appears to have led to both trains being allowed onto the single-track section simultaneously. While signals indicated that the passenger train should have had priority, reports suggest there may have been an issue with the interpretation of these signals. Additionally, some sources suggest that the driver of the freight train may have been fatigued and possibly unresponsive to signals, although this was never conclusively verified.

An investigating judge, Tomislav Smiljković, said the heavily loaded freight train had gone through a stop signal just before the collision. The engineer of the express, bound from Belgrade to Skopje, said he did not feel the crash but found that his train had been sliced in two. He added that the first three cars were left on the rails but that "the rest were completely smashed".

== Victims ==
The collision resulted in 62 fatalities and 106 injuries, with the majority of casualties occurring among the passengers of the express train. 60 people died immediately, while two others succumbed in the hospital later. Officials at the time commented they believed more dead would be found by emergency workers cutting through the wreckage with acetylene torches, as some of the cars were crushed to a quarter of their original size. Emergency response efforts were complicated by the remote location and difficult terrain, which delayed access for rescue teams.

== Investigation ==
In the aftermath of the crash, Yugoslav railway authorities conducted an investigation and identified human error and communication lapses as primary factors. This prompted several procedural changes, including enhanced dispatcher training, new working hour regulations for train operators, and upgraded signalling equipment on single-track sections.

Siniša Aleksić, the driver of the freight train, and his assistant, Jordan Glavčić, were indicted for the crash. They were both injured in the crash, but survived. Their trial started on 10 December 1979 in the district court in Kruševac. According to the indictment, Aleksić and Glavčić were guilty of gross negligence; they started their shift over-exhausted because of doing some private work in free time, but they turned off a safety device intended to check if the driver is awake. They fell asleep as their train was entering the station, although the stop signal was set to prevent their entry. The train passed the signal at danger, entered the station on the 4th line, broke a turnpike number 6, switched to the 3rd line and collided with a passenger train properly entering the station from the direction of Belgrade. This caused 62 deaths, 106 injuries and material damage of 20,468,000 dinars. At the trial, Aleksić claimed that he turned off the safety device because it was defective, but this was disputed. On 4 April 1980, Aleksić was sentenced to 20 years and Glavčić to 12 years. After appeals, the Supreme Court of Serbia completely affirmed Aleksić's sentence, while increasing Glavčić's sentence to 15 years.

== See also ==
- List of rail accidents in Yugoslavia
- List of rail accidents in Serbia
- List of rail accidents (1970–1979)
