= Nikola Vučević =

Montenegrin basketball player (born 1990)

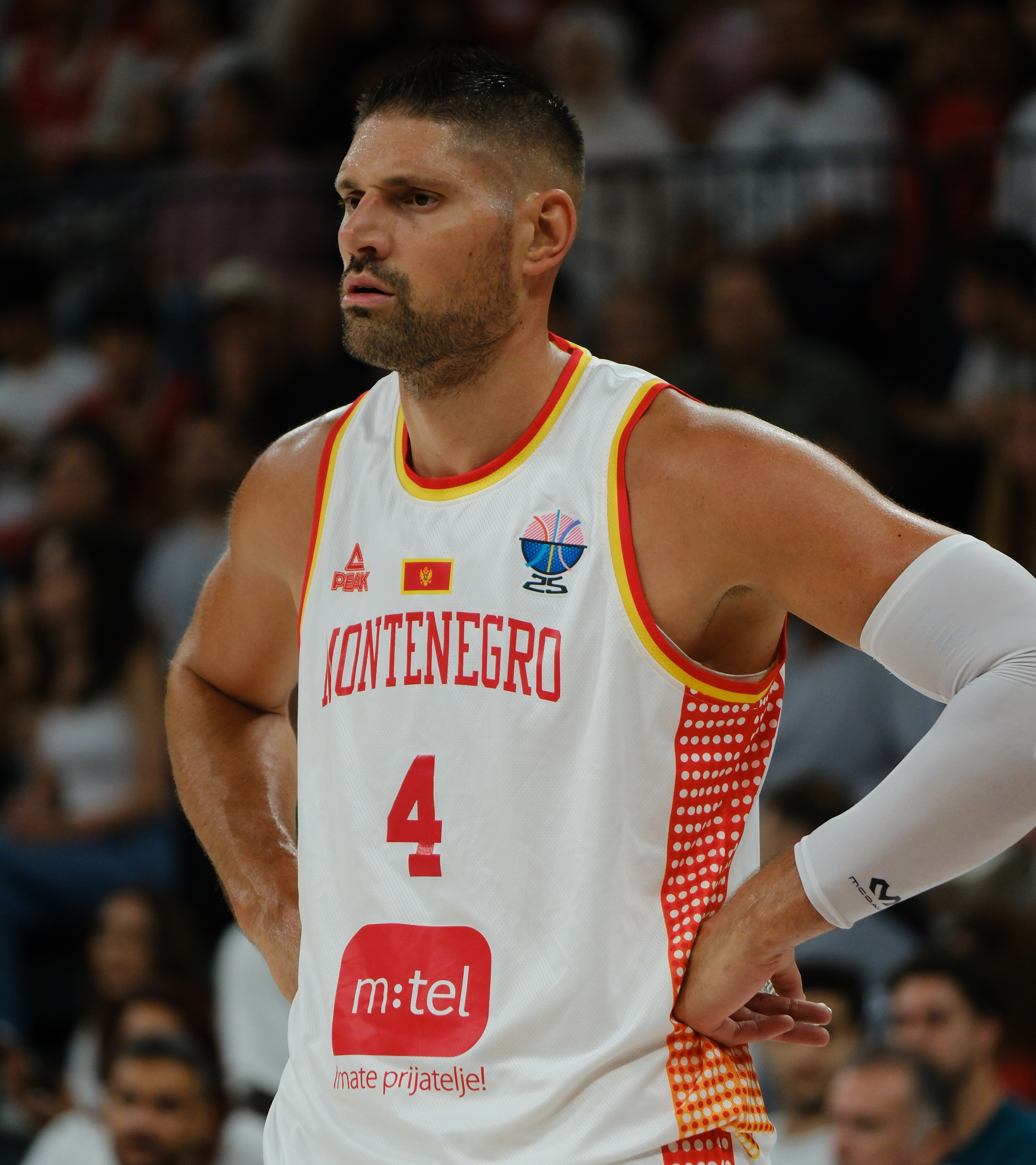
- Vučević with the Montenegro national team in 2025

No. 9 – Orlando Magic
- Position: Center
- League: NBA

Personal information
- Born: October 24, 1990 (age 36) Morges, Switzerland
- Listed height: 6 ft 11 in (2.11 m)
- Listed weight: 265 lb (120 kg)

Career information
- High school: Stoneridge Preparatory (Simi Valley, California)
- College: USC (2008–2011)
- NBA draft: 2011: 1st round, 16th overall pick
- Drafted by: Philadelphia 76ers
- Playing career: 2011–present

Career history
- 2011: Budućnost
- 2011–2012: Philadelphia 76ers
- 2012–2021: Orlando Magic
- 2021–2026: Chicago Bulls
- 2026: Boston Celtics
- 2026–present: Orlando Magic

Career highlights
- 2× NBA All-Star (2019, 2021); AP honorable mention All-American (2011); First-team All-Pac-10 (2011); Second-team All-Pac-10 (2010)
- Stats at NBA.com
- Stats at Basketball Reference

Nikola Vučević (Montenegrin Cyrillic: Никола Вучевић, pronounced [nǐkola ʋûːtʃeʋitɕ]; born 24 October 1990), nicknamed Vooch, is a Montenegrin professional basketball player for the Orlando Magic of the National Basketball Association (NBA). He played college basketball for the USC Trojans before being drafted 16th overall in the 2011 NBA draft by the Philadelphia 76ers.

Vučević, who spent his rookie season with the 76ers, was traded to the Magic before the start of the 2012–13 season as a part of the four-team trade that sent Dwight Howard to the Los Angeles Lakers. He played nine seasons for the Magic and was named an NBA All-Star twice during his tenure with the team. In the middle of the 2020–21 season, the Magic traded Vučević to the Chicago Bulls. After five seasons, he was traded to the Boston Celtics in 2026.

== Early life ==
Vučević was born in Morges, Switzerland, during the time his father, Borislav Vučević, was playing professionally in the country. His mother is Ljiljana Kubura. He was primarily raised in Belgium, where the family moved in 1992 when his father signed a professional contract there. The Vučević family moved to Montenegro within the Serbia and Montenegro state union in 2003, settling in the coastal town of Bar, his father's hometown. Identifying youth basketball work in Belgium to be inferior compared to that in the Balkan countries, his father moved the family to Montenegro to give Vučević a better chance at developing his basketball skills. He began training within KK Mornar's youth system while his father simultaneously took over a youth team coaching post at the club.

In January 2006, while returning home to Bar from the KK Mornar youth team winter training in Kolašin, fifteen-year-old Vučević and his father survived the Bioče derailment, a train crash in Montenegro that killed 47 people and injured nearly 200 others.

In 2007, Vučević was named Montenegro's Best Young Player.

== High school ==
Vučević moved to Simi Valley, California in the United States in October 2007 to play his senior year of high school at Stoneridge Prep. He knew little English, but did speak French, which many of his teammates also spoke. Under coach Babacar Sy, a friend of his father's, he was team captain and led the team in scoring and rebounding with 18 points and 12 rebounds per game.

== College career ==
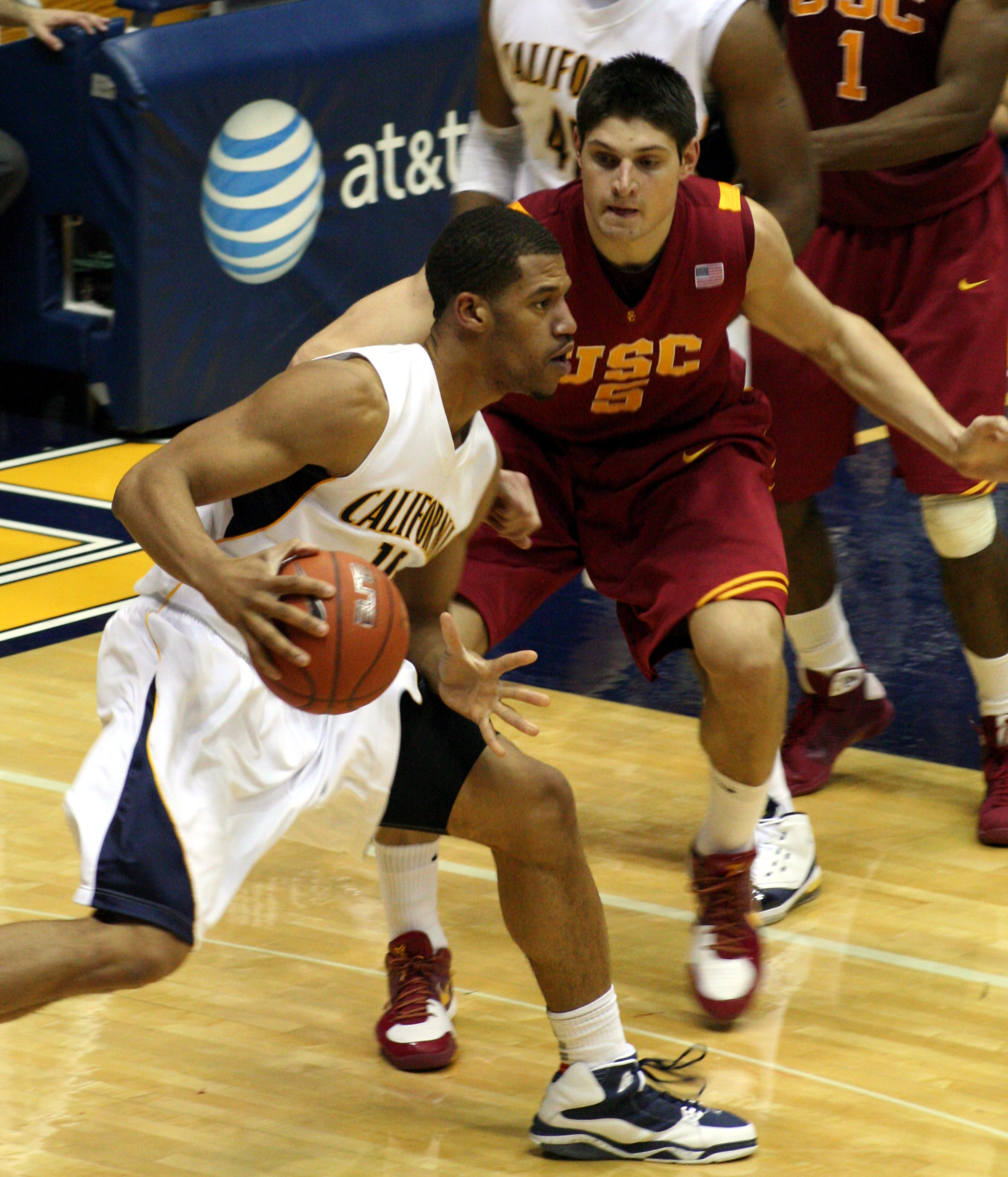
Vučević guarding Jamal Boykin in a January 2010 game

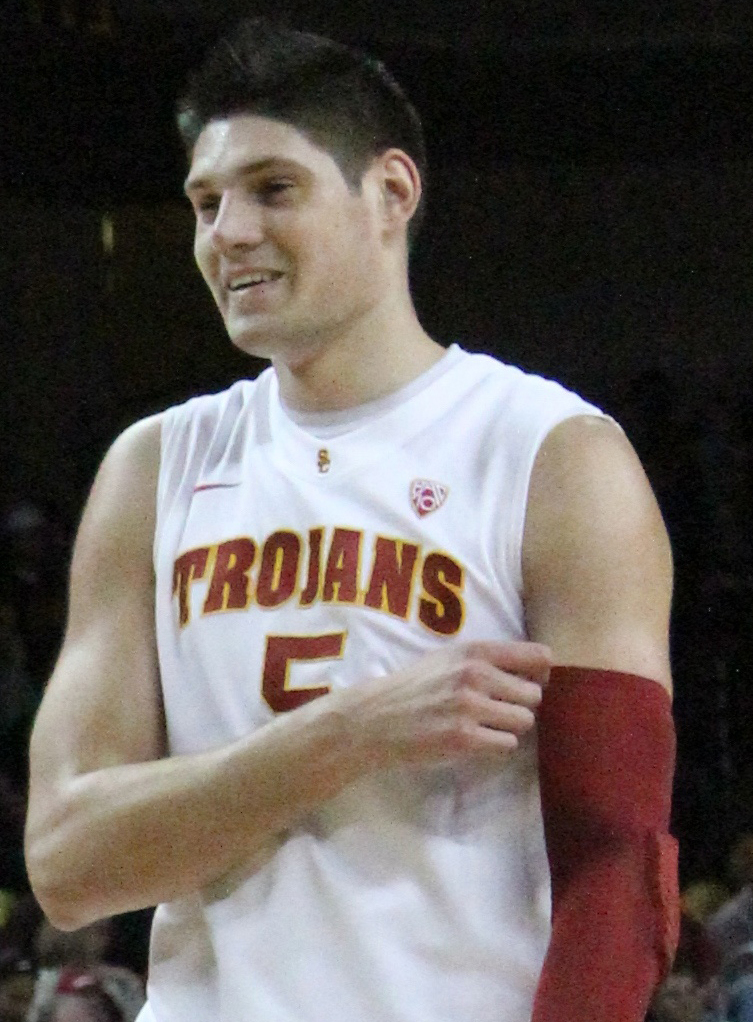
Vučević with the USC Trojans in February 2011

Vučević played three seasons with the Trojans of the University of Southern California.

=== Freshman ===
Vučević missed the first eight games of the season while waiting to have his amateur status confirmed by the NCAA Clearinghouse. He averaged 2.6 points and 2.7 rebounds in 23 games in three starts. Vučević played in his first game with USC on December 15, 2008, against Pepperdine, and had two points, two blocks and two rebounds in six minutes. He made his first start of the season on January 24, 2009, at Washington State in the Trojans' 46–44 win with a season-high eight points and five rebounds. He also scored eight points on February 9, 2009, at UCLA, and in his second start of the season on 19 February against Washington State. Vučević had a season-best seven rebounds in that game and matched that total on March 5, 2009, vs. Oregon. Vučević scored six points and had four rebounds in the NCAA second-round loss to Michigan State on March 22. In all, he made 57.8 percent of his shots from the field (26-for-45).

=== Sophomore ===
Vučević began to excel in his sophomore season. He scored 18 points and had eight rebounds in the first game of the season against UC Riverside on November 17, 2009, both totals better than any of his freshman games. Vučević had 18 points and 14 rebounds at Texas on December 3, 2009. He scored a career-high 19 points and had 11 rebounds versus Loyola Marymount on November 21, 2009, for his first career double-double. He matched his career high with 19 points on 9-of-12 shooting at UCLA on January 16, 2010, scoring 17 points in the second half. By the end of the year, he had led USC in scoring five times and in rebounding 20 times, including the last nine games.

Overall, he was the second-best scorer and leading rebounder on the Trojans, with 10.7 points and 9.4 rebounds per game. Vučević led the Pac-10 with 283 rebounds and offensive rebounds per game (6.3) and his 39 blocks were the fourth most in the conference. Vučević's .504 shooting percentage (126 for 250) led USC and was seventh best in the Pac-10. Vučević was named the 2009–10 Pac-10 Most Improved Player, and earned all-Pac-10 second-team and Pac-10 honorable-mention all-defensive team honors. He had the second-most blocks ever in a season by a Trojan sophomore and the third-most rebounds. Vučević started all 30 games for USC and posted 10 double-doubles.

=== Junior ===
As a junior, Vučević averaged 17.1 points and 10.3 rebounds per game. He was picked to the Fourth Team All-America by Fox Sports and was named to the All-Pac-10 first team. In March 2011, Vučević announced that he would give up his senior year to enter the NBA draft. The website NBAdraft.net projected him as the 23rd pick in the draft.

During his three-season career with the Trojans, Vučević averaged 11.1 points and 8.0 rebounds per game.

== Professional career ==
=== Budućnost (2011) ===
On June 23, 2011, Vučević was drafted with the 16th overall pick in the 2011 NBA draft by the Philadelphia 76ers. During the 2011 NBA lockout, Vučević played for Montenegrin team Budućnost Podgorica.

=== Philadelphia 76ers (2011–2012) ===
Following the conclusion of the lockout, Vučević returned to the United States and signed his rookie scale contract with the 76ers on December 9, 2011. On February 22, 2012, Vučević scored a season-high 18 points in a loss to the Houston Rockets.

=== Orlando Magic (2012–2021) ===
==== 2012–13 season ====
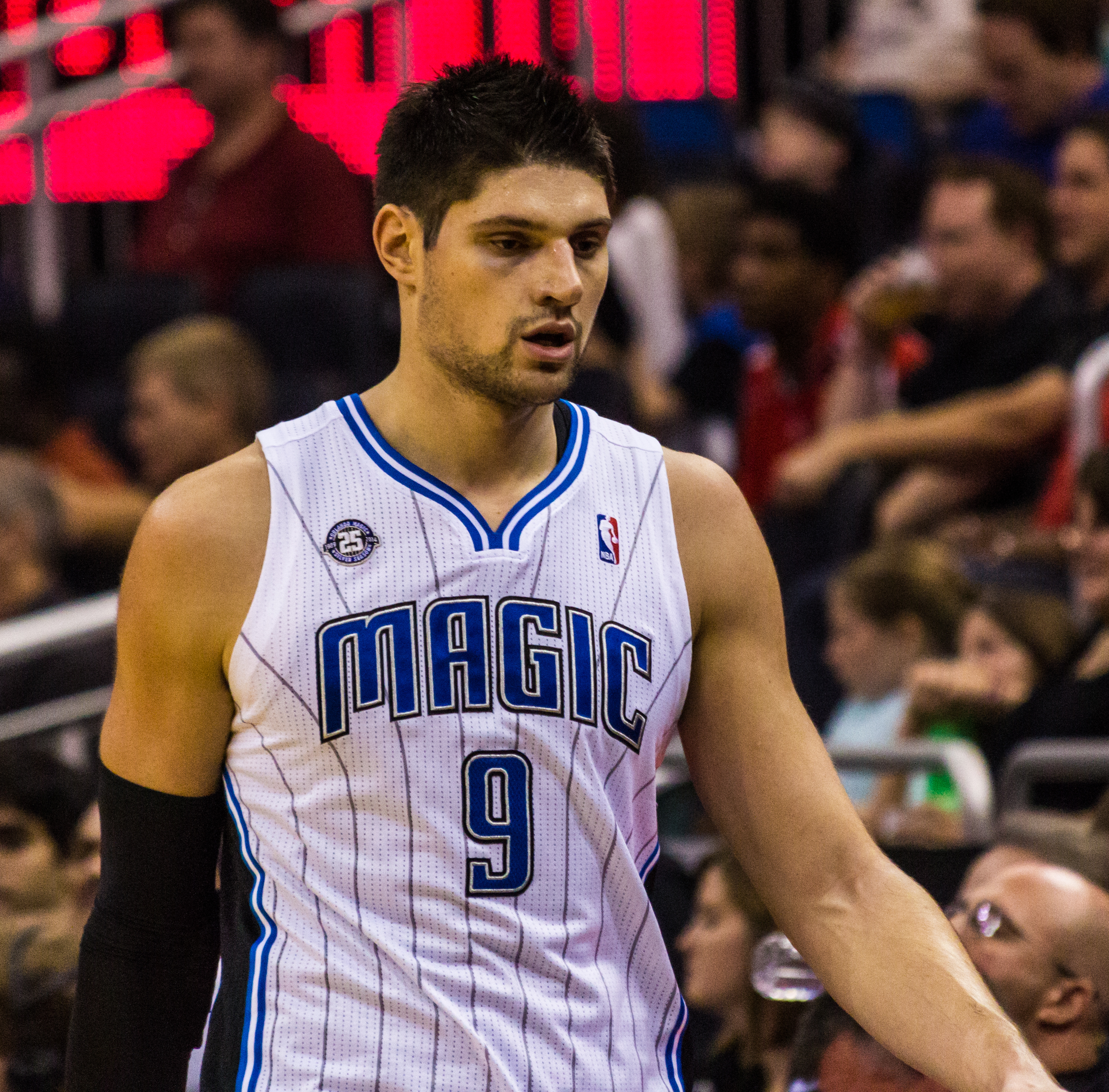
Vučević with the Orlando Magic in December 2013

On August 10, 2012, Vučević was traded to the Orlando Magic as a part of the blockbuster four-team deal that sent Dwight Howard to the Los Angeles Lakers. On December 31, 2012, in an overtime loss to the Miami Heat, Vučević set a franchise record with 29 rebounds. On April 10, 2013, he recorded his second straight 20/20 game with a career-high 30 points and 20 rebounds in a 113–103 win over the Milwaukee Bucks.

==== 2013–14 season ====
On November 6, 2013, Vučević recorded a career-high-tying 30 points and 21 rebounds in a 98–90 win over the Los Angeles Clippers. Vučević's strong play over the second half of the 2013–14 season was noticeable on March 28, 2014, when he dominated the Charlotte Bobcats. He overcame a slow start shooting the ball to finish the game with 24 points and 23 rebounds in an overtime victory. Vučević made nine of his last 11 shots to lead a Magic rally in the second half, while also grabbing 16 first-half rebounds and 10 offensive boards in the game, marking the sixth 20-point, 20-rebound game of his career. On 31 March, Vučević earned his first Eastern Conference Player of the Week honor, after he led the Magic to a 2–1 week. He logged a double-double average with 22.7 points (sixth in the conference) and a league-leading 14.3 rebounds. He posted a point–rebound double-double in all three contests. Vučević became the first Magic player to win the Eastern Player of the Week honors since Dwight Howard in 2012.

==== 2014–15 season ====
On October 23, 2014, Vučević signed a four-year, $53 million contract extension with the Magic. On April 3, 2015, he scored a career-high 37 points in a 97–84 win over the Minnesota Timberwolves.

==== 2015–16 season ====
On November 11, 2015, Vučević didn't start for the Magic against the Los Angeles Lakers, returning to action after a three-game absence with a right knee contusion. Vučević, who had started all 223 games for the Magic over his four-season tenure, came off the bench for the first time and scored 18 points, including a fallaway 18-footer at the buzzer to lift the Magic over the Lakers 101–99. Vučević averaged 18.4 points, 9.0 rebounds and 3.0 assists in his first 12 games of December (December, 1–23). Shaquille O'Neal is the only other Magic player to reach those numbers in one month in franchise history. On February 7, 2016, he scored 22 points and hit an 18-footer at the buzzer to lead the Magic over the Atlanta Hawks 96–94, winning for only the third time in 18 games in 2016. On 23 February, he scored a season-high 35 points in a 124–115 win over the Philadelphia 76ers. On 31 March, he returned to action after missing the previous 13 games with a right groin strain. He subsequently came off the bench for just the second in his Magic tenure, as he scored 24 points in a 114–94 win over the Indiana Pacers. He came off the bench for a further three games before returning to the starting line-up on 8 April against the Miami Heat, where he scored a game-high 29 points in a 112–109 win.

==== 2016–17 season ====
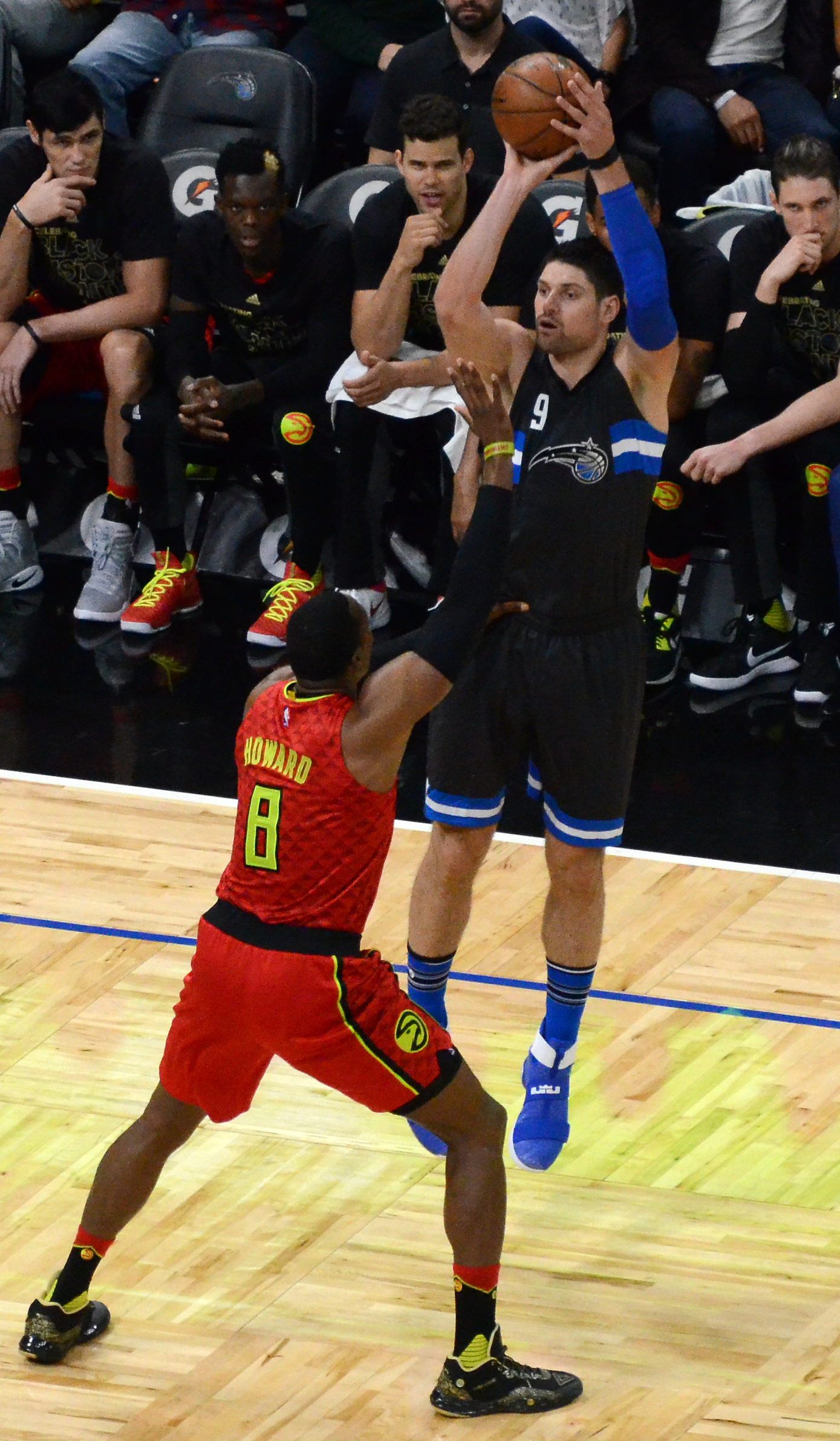
Vučević attempts a mid-range shot as former Magic Dwight Howard defends in a February 2017 game.

Vučević started in all 16 games for the Magic to start the 2016–17 season, coming off the bench for just the sixth time in his Magic tenure on November 27, 2016, against the Milwaukee Bucks. Vučević continued to come off the bench throughout December, while also missing three games between 10 and 14 December with a back injury. On December 20, he had a season-high 26 points and 12 rebounds off the bench in a 136–130 double overtime win over the Miami Heat. He regained his starting spot in mid-January, and as a result, he hit 13 of 18 shots, scored a season-high 30 points and grabbed 10 rebounds to lead the Magic to a 115–109 victory over the Portland Trail Blazers on 13 January. On February 7, 2017, he had 14 points and a season-high 19 rebounds in a 128–104 loss to the Houston Rockets. On March 11, 2017, in a 116–104 loss to Cleveland, Vučević had a team-high 20 points and 16 rebounds after missing the previous four games with a sore right Achilles. On April 10, 2017, he grabbed 10 rebounds against Chicago to move ahead of Shaquille O'Neal into second place in franchise history, trailing only Dwight Howard.

==== 2017–18 season ====
On October 20, 2017, Vučević scored a career-high 41 points and grabbed 12 rebounds in a 126–121 loss to the Brooklyn Nets. On December 9, 2017, he recorded his first career triple-double with game highs of 31 points, 13 rebounds and 10 assists in a 117–110 loss to the Atlanta Hawks. He became the first Magic center to record a triple-double with assists—Shaquille O'Neal and Dwight Howard each accomplished it with blocks. On 23 December, he suffered a fractured left hand against the Washington Wizards and was subsequently ruled out for six to eight weeks. He returned to action on 22 February 2018, against the New York Knicks after missing 23 games, recording 19 points and six rebounds in a 120–113 loss. On 14 March, he recorded 22 points, nine rebounds and nine assists in a 126–117 win over the Milwaukee Bucks.

==== 2018–19 season ====
On October 20, 2018, Vučević recorded his second career triple-double with 27 points, 13 rebounds and 12 assists in a 116–115 loss to the Philadelphia 76ers. On 17 November, he had a season-high 36 points and 13 rebounds in a 130–117 win over the Los Angeles Lakers. Eight days later, he had 31 points, 15 rebounds and seven assists in a 108–104 win also against the Lakers. Prior to the second match-up against the Lakers, Lakers coach Luke Walton described Vučević as a "nightmare to matchup [sic] with" because of the versatility of his offensive game. Following the 108–104 win, Lakers forward LeBron James noted that "He's (Vučević) got our number this year. All you can say." On 19 November, Vučević was named the Eastern Conference Player of the Week, after leading the Magic to a 3–1 record. It was the first time a Magic player has won the award since 2014, when Vučević himself captured the award for the first time in his NBA career. He averaged 27.6 points, 12.3 rebounds, 4.0 assists and 1.3 steals while shooting 58.1 percent from the floor and 47 percent from 3-point range. During his stretch of strong play, Vučević became the first Magic player to post at least 28 points and 10 rebounds in three consecutive games since Dwight Howard. He also became the first Magic player to score 30 points in back-to-back games since Victor Oladipo in March 2015. On January 6, 2019, Vučević had 16 points and 24 rebounds in a 106–96 loss to the Los Angeles Clippers. On 31 January, he received his first All-Star selection in his eight-year career, earning Eastern Conference reserve honors for the 2019 NBA All-Star Game. He became the Magic's first All-Star since Howard in 2012. On 17 March, he scored 17 of his 27 points in the first eight minutes of the game and added 20 rebounds in a 101–91 win over the Atlanta Hawks. Vučević helped the Magic go 22–9 over the final 31 games of the season to clinch their first playoff berth since 2012. In game one of the Magic's first-round playoff series against the Toronto Raptors, Vučević scored 11 points in a 104–101 upset victory. They went on to lose to the Raptors in five games.

==== 2019–20 season ====
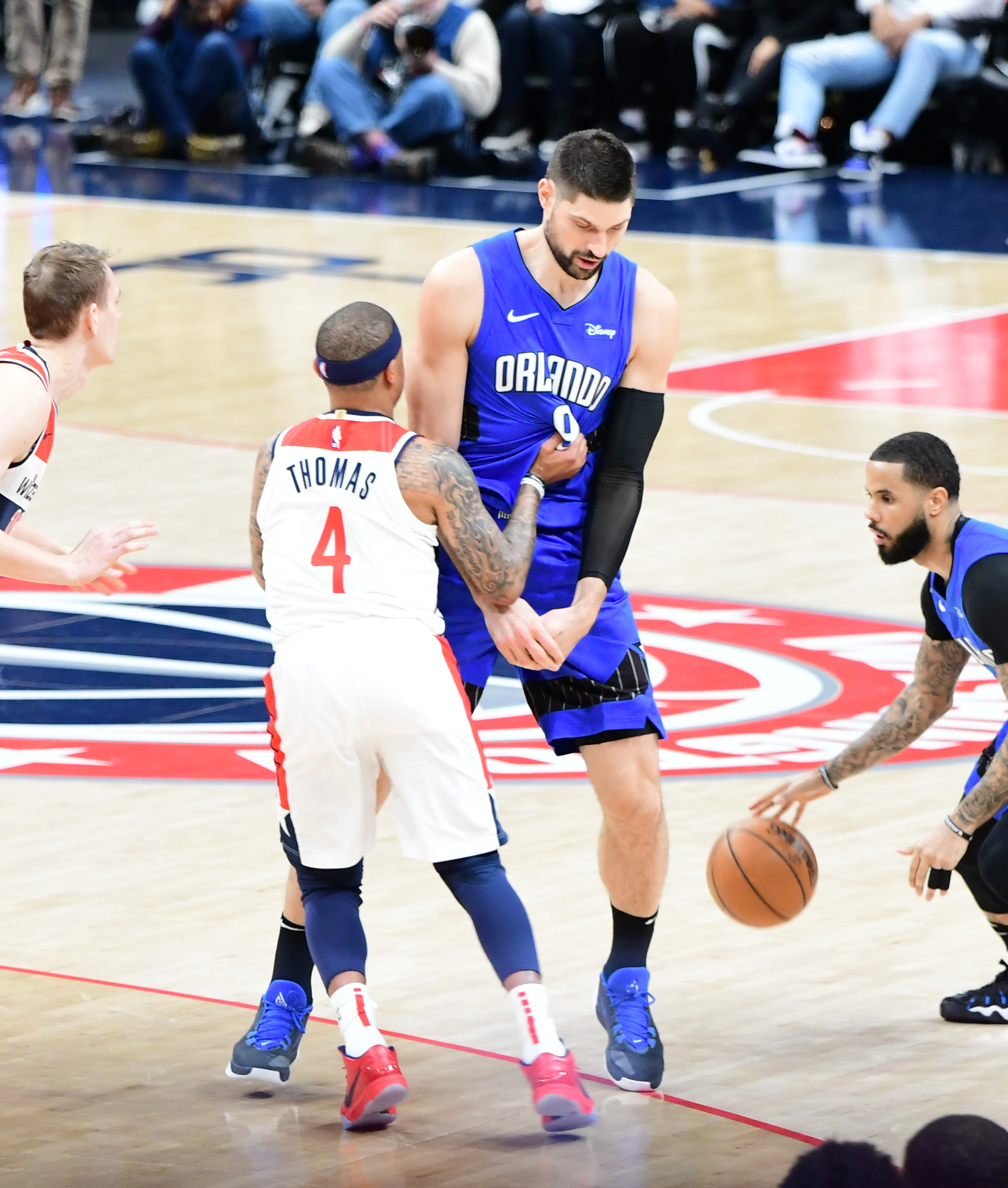
Vučević setting a screen against Isaiah Thomas in a January 2020 game

Vučević entered the offseason as an unrestricted free agent. On July 6, 2019, he signed a four-year, $100 million contract to remain with the Magic. On November 17, Vučević posted 30 points on 11 of 14 shooting, including 3-for-4 from three along with 17 rebounds and six assists in a 125–121 victory against the Washington Wizards, putting up season highs for points and rebounds while also logging his seventh consecutive double-double and his tenth overall on the season. In his efforts, Vučević set a franchise record for most 30-point, 15-rebound and five-assist games with four, surpassing Shaquille O'Neal with three. The following day, Vučević earned his third Eastern Conference Player of the Week honor, after logging a double-double average with 21.7 points, 14.0 rebounds to go along 4.0 assists and 1.33 blocks per game while shooting 54.2 percent overall and 66.7 percent from 3-point range. He led the Magic in scoring and rebounding and sparked its 3–0 record during the week with victories over the Philadelphia 76ers, the San Antonio Spurs and the Wizards.

==== 2020–21 season ====
Though largely credited to a balanced attack, Vučević played a key role in the hot start to the season by the Magic.

On February 5, 2021, Vučević scored a career-high 43 points, grabbed a season-high 19 rebounds and dished out 4 assists in a 123–119 win over the Chicago Bulls. He succeeded in two free throw shots with 2.6 seconds left to play, ending the Magic's fourth losing streak. In his efforts, Vučević joined Shaquille O'Neal and Dwight Howard as the third player in franchise history to log at least 43 points and 19 rebounds in a game. On February 19, Vučević logged his third career triple-double with 30 points, 16 rebounds and 10 assists in a 124–120 win over the Golden State Warriors, becoming the second center (along with Nikola Jokić) to score a 30-point triple-double with zero turnovers since 1985. He also set a franchise record for the most triple-doubles for the center position. On 23 February, Vučević was named an Eastern Conference reserve for the 2021 NBA All-Star Game.

At the conclusion of Vučević's time with the Magic, he ranks at or near the top of a number of key categories in the Magic franchise history, including first in all-time field goals made (4,490), second in rebounds (6,381), third in blocks (550), third in points scored (10,423) and fourth in games played (591). He also led the franchise to end its six-year playoff drought and reach the postseason for two straight seasons.

=== Chicago Bulls (2021–2026) ===
==== 2020–21 season ====
On March 25, 2021, the Orlando Magic traded Vučević along with Al-Farouq Aminu to the Chicago Bulls in exchange for Wendell Carter Jr., Otto Porter Jr. and two future first-round picks. Vučević played and started in all 44 games and was averaging 24.5 points, 11.8 rebounds and 3.8 assists, while shooting 40.6% from three-point range and 82.7% from the free throw line with the Magic for the 2020–21 season. He was the fourth-leading rebounder in the league at the time. On March 27, Vučević debuted for the Bulls in a 120–104 loss to the San Antonio Spurs, scoring a game-high 21 points, grabbing nine rebounds and dishing out four assists in 32 minutes of action. On 31 March, Vučević logged his first double-double as a Bull with 24 points and 10 rebounds in a 121–116 loss to the Phoenix Suns. On April 4, Vučević posted his 32nd double-double of the season and second as a Bull with 22 points and a game-high 13 rebounds along with two assists, two steals and two blocks in a 115–107 win over the Brooklyn Nets, ending the Bulls' longest losing streak of the season at six games. Two days later, Vučević tallied 32 points, 17 rebounds and five assists in a 113–97 victory against the Indiana Pacers, becoming the third player in franchise history to log at least 30 points, 15 rebounds and five assists in a game, joining Joakim Noah and Pau Gasol. On 26 April, Vučević logged his third straight double-double and the fortieth of his career with 24 points and 11 rebounds in a 110–102 win over the Miami Heat. It was also his tenth double-double in his 18 games as a Bull. After missing two games due to a hip injury, Vučević returned to action on 6 May, recording his sixth consecutive double-double with 29 points and 14 rebounds, in addition to three assists, two steals and a block in a 120–99 victory over the Charlotte Hornets. The next day, Vučević posted his second triple-double of the season and the fourth of his career with 18 points, 14 rebounds and 10 assists in a 121–99 win over the Boston Celtics, becoming the first Bulls player to log a triple-double since Jimmy Butler in 2017.

==== 2021–22 season ====
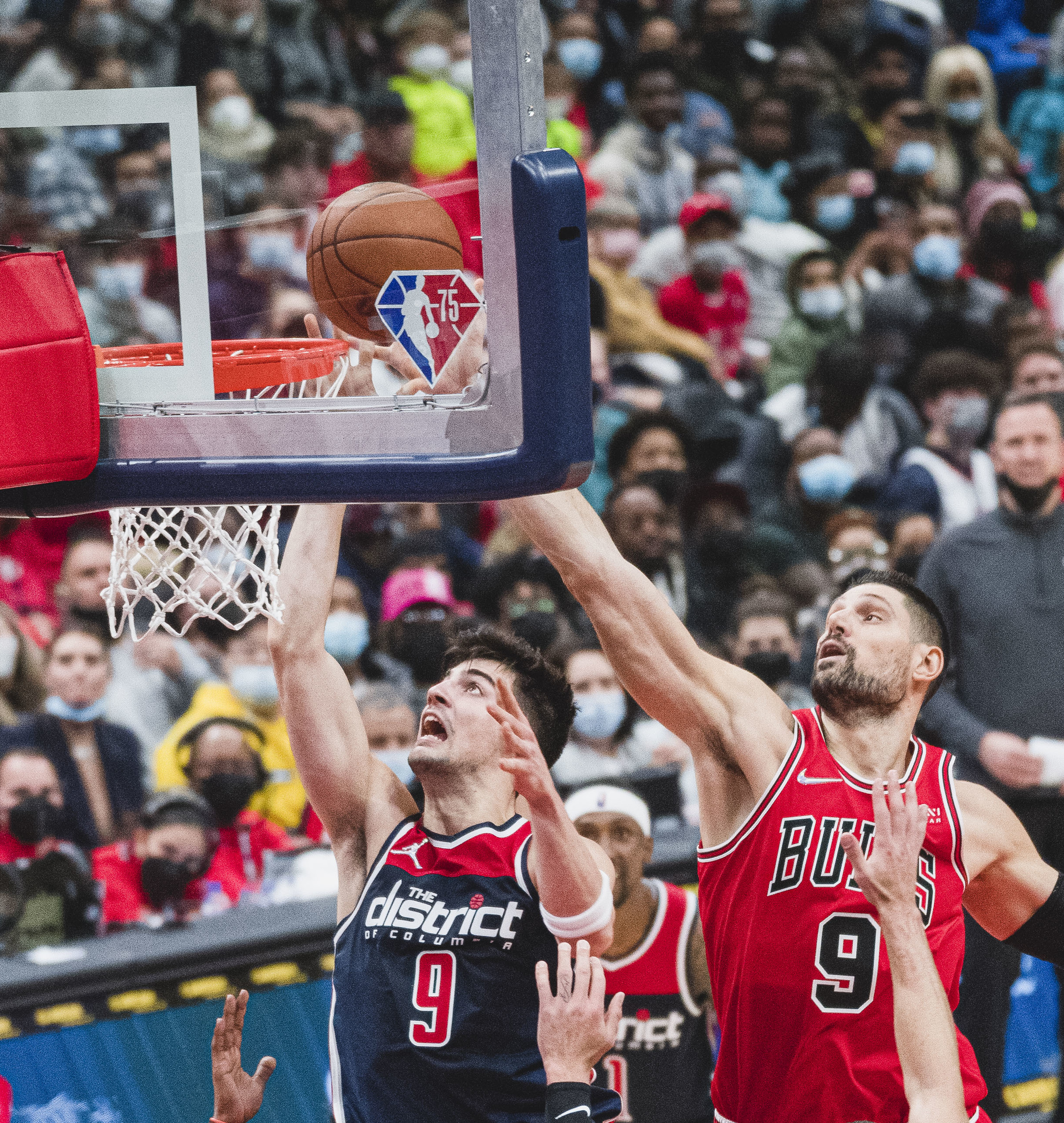
Vučević battling Deni Avdija at the rim in a January 2022 game. Their respective fathers, Boro and Zufer, played against one another in the Yugoslav First League throughout the 1980s, including appearing together on the Yugoslavia national team at the 1983 Mediterranean Games.

On November 11, 2021, Vučević entered the NBA's health and safety protocols after testing positive for COVID-19. After missing seven games, Vučević made his return on 24 November, posting a double-double with 14 points and 13 rebounds in a 118–113 loss to the Houston Rockets. On November 29, Vučević logged 30 points on 6-of-6 shooting from three, in addition to 14 rebounds and five assists in a 133–119 victory over the Charlotte Hornets, joining Kemba Walker as the only two players in NBA history to record at least 30 points, 10 rebounds and 5 assists with a 100% 3-point field goal percentage on at least five attempts. On 27 December, Vučević scored 24 points, knocking down four 3-pointers to go along with 17 rebounds, six assists and four blocks in a 130–118 victory against the Atlanta Hawks, becoming the first player in the league to ever post such stat line. Two days later, Vučević logged a double-double with 16 points and 20 rebounds on 8-of-14 shooting from the field, to go along with one assist, three steals and one block across 33 minutes of play in a win over the Hawks, joining Joakim Noah and Tyson Chandler as the third Bulls player to grab at least 20 rebounds in less than 35 minutes of action since Dennis Rodman in the 1990s. On February 4, 2022, Vučević finished with 36 points, 17 rebounds, four assists and three blocks in a 122–115 win over the Indiana Pacers, becoming the first Bulls player since Michael Jordan in 1996 to log 35 points, 15 rebounds and 3 blocks in a game. On February 14, 2022, Vučević scored 25 points, grabbed 16 rebounds and dished out five assists in a 120–109 win against the San Antonio Spurs.

On April 20, during Game 2 of the first round of the playoffs, Vučević recorded a double-double of 24 points and 13 rebounds in a 114–110 win over the reigning champions Milwaukee Bucks. Bulls would go on to lose to the Bucks in five games.

==== 2022–23 season ====
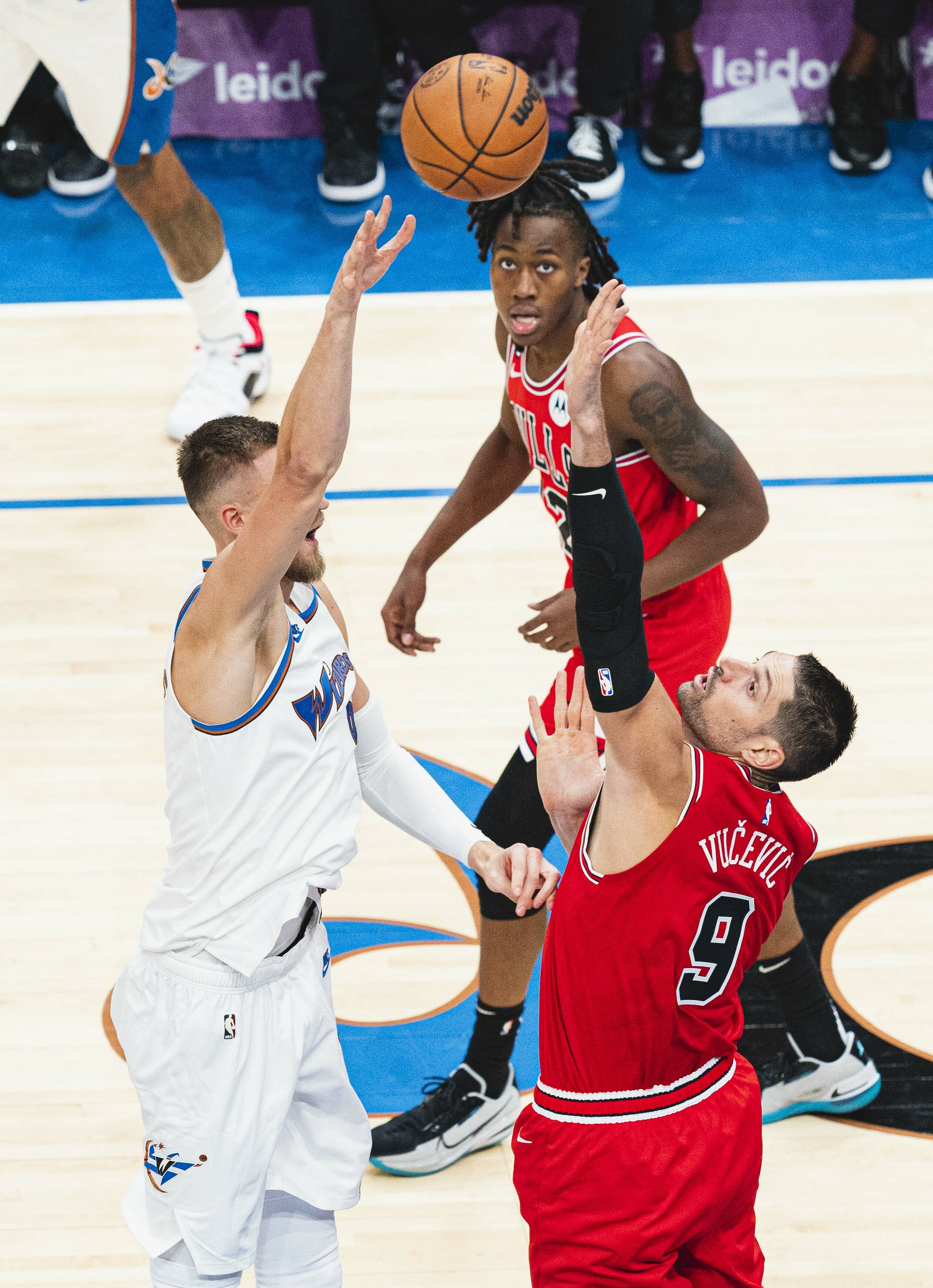
Vučević attempts to block Kristaps Porziņģis' in a match against the Washington Wizards on October 21, 2022.

On October 24, 2022, Vučević scored 18 points, grabbed 23 rebounds and delivered five assists in a 120–102 win against the reigning Eastern Conference champions Boston Celtics. On October 29, 2022, Vučević logged a double-double with 23 points and 19 rebounds on 5-of-7 shooting from three, in a 114–109 loss against the Philadelphia 76ers, becoming the first Bulls player with at least 20 points, 15 rebounds and 5 threes in a single game, according to information supplied to the team by the Elias Sports Bureau. It's the second time in his career he has achieved that, and he is one of 38 players in NBA history to do so at least once. On November 11, 2022, Vučević was fined $15,000 by the NBA for making an obscene gesture on the playing court. The incident occurred in the first quarter of the Bulls' 115–111 loss to the New Orleans Pelicans on November 9 at United Center. On December 20, Vučević posted 29 points on 13-of-17 shooting from the field and 12 rebounds in a 113–103 win over the Miami Heat.

On January 6, 2023, Vučević had his fifth career triple-double with 19 points, 18 rebounds and 10 assists in a 126–112 win over the Philadelphia 76ers. On January 15, Vučević tied his career high with 43 points, along with 13 rebounds, four assists and four steals in a 132–118 win over the reigning champions Golden State Warriors.

==== 2023–24 season ====
On June 28, 2023, Vučević signed a three-year, $60 million contract extension with the Bulls. On November 1, Vučević recorded 21 points and a season-high 20 rebounds in a 114–105 loss against the Dallas Mavericks. On March 7, 2024, Vučević scored a season-high 33 points, along with 11 rebounds and 5 assists in a 125–122 win over the Golden State Warriors.

==== 2024–25 season ====
On January 17, 2025, Vučević scored a season-high 40 points (17 in the fourth quarter) and grabbed 13 rebounds in a 125–123 loss against the Charlotte Hornets. On February 2, Vučević had his sixth career triple-double with 20 points, 11 rebounds and 10 assists in a 127–119 loss against the Detroit Pistons. On February 22, Vučević became the 44th player in NBA history to reach 10,000 career rebounds. On April 11, Vučević posted a near triple-double with 15 points, 12 rebounds and 8 assists in a 119–89 win over the Washington Wizards to help the Bulls clinch the 9th seed in the East Play-In.

==== 2025–26 season ====
In his season debut on October 22, 2025, Vučević recorded 28 points and 14 rebounds in the Chicago Bulls’ 115–111 win over the Detroit Pistons, shooting 11 of 18 from the field and 4 of 6 from three-point range. On November 2, Vučević scored 26 points as the Bulls defeated the New York Knicks 135–125, improving to 5–0 for their best start since 1996–97 season. On November 4, Vučević recorded a double-double with 19 points and 10 rebounds, including a game-winning three-pointer that helped the Bulls beat the Philadelphia 76ers 113–111 after rallying from a 24-point deficit. On November 19, Vučević scored a team-high 27 points, knocking down a buzzer-beating three-pointer in a 122–121 win over the Portland Trail Blazers.

On January 14, 2026, Vučević scored a season-high 35 points, along with seven rebounds, five assists and two blocks, and made a tiebreaking layup with four seconds remaining to lead the Bulls to a 128–126 win over the Utah Jazz. He made 48 starts for Chicago during the 2025–26 season, recording averages of 16.9 points, 9.0 rebounds and 3.8 assists.

=== Boston Celtics (2026) ===
On February 5, 2026, Vučević and a 2027 second-round pick were traded to the Boston Celtics in exchange for Anfernee Simons and a 2026 second-round pick. On February 6, Vučević debuted for the Celtics in a 98–96 win over the Miami Heat, contributing 11 points, 12 rebounds, four assists and two steals in 28 minutes of action from the bench. In his eighth game with the Celtics he scored 28 points and had 11 rebounds in 25 minutes. On March 6, Vučević suffered a fractured right ring finger, and was projected to miss a month after undergoing surgery. In 16 total appearances (including one start) for Boston, he logged averages of 9.7 points, 6.6 rebounds, and 2.0 assists.

=== Return to Orlando (2026–present) ===
On July 1, 2026, Vučević signed a one-year, $3.9 million contract to return to the Orlando Magic.

== National team career ==
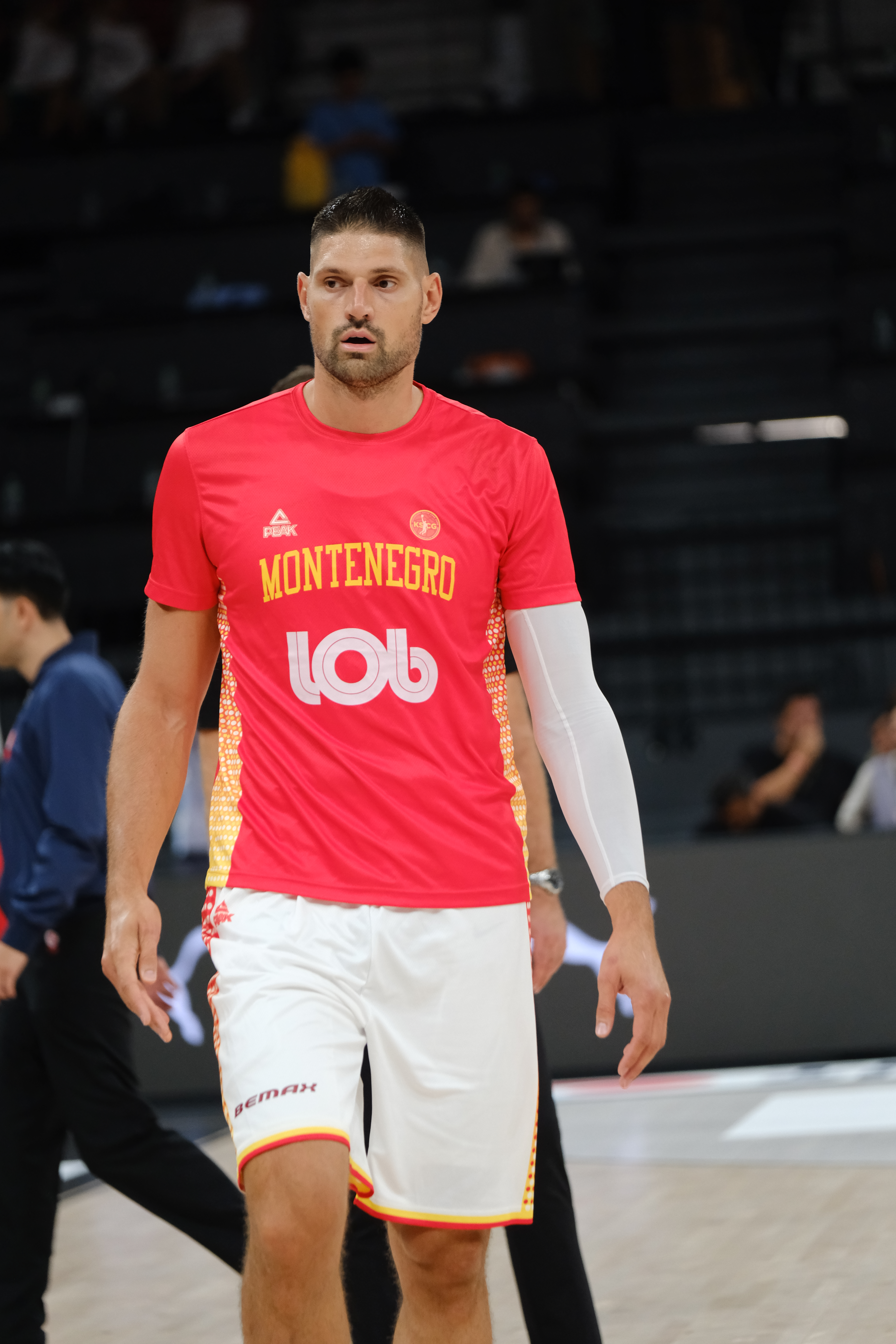
Vučević with the national team on August 23, 2025

Vučević represented the Montenegro Under-20 team at the FIBA Europe Under-20 Championship. He then represented the senior Montenegro national basketball team at FIBA EuroBasket 2011, FIBA EuroBasket 2013 and FIBA EuroBasket 2017. He averaged 5.0 points per game and 3.2 rebounds per game in 2011 while backing up Nikola Peković. With Peković out of the 2013 tournament, Vučević started for the team and put up 7.0 points per game and 4.0 rebounds per game.

Vučević represented Montenegro at the 2019 FIBA Basketball World Cup. In 5 games, he averaged 14.6 points, 6.4 rebounds and 1.2 assists, while shooting 47.6% from the field.

Vučević returned to represent Montenegro at the 2023 FIBA Basketball World Cup. In 5 games, he averaged 19.8 points, 8.8 rebounds and 1.2 assists, while shooting 52.7% from the field.

During EuroBasket 2025, Vučević led Montenegro in points, rebounds and blocks, averaging 20.8 points, 11.6 rebounds and 0.8 blocks per game. Montenegro, however, failed to advance after recording one win in four games. Following the team's elimination, Vučević announced his retirement from international basketball, citing "it's time for a new generation to leave its mark."

== Personal life ==
Vučević's father, Borislav Vučević, played professional basketball in Yugoslavia, Switzerland and Belgium—a 24-year career the highlight of which was being on the KK Bosna roster that won the European Champions Cup in 1979 in addition to several Yugoslavia national team appearances, primarily at the 1983 Mediterranean Games in Casablanca, Morocco and EuroBasket 1985 in West Germany. Vučević's Serb mother, Ljiljana Kubura, also played basketball professionally as a 6-foot-2 forward for the Sarajevo club Željezničar, as well as for the Yugoslavia women's national team.

In 2016, Vučević married his longtime girlfriend, Nikoletta, the sister of former NBA player Aleksandar "Sasha" Pavlović. The couple have three sons.

Vučević is an ethnic Serb and a Serbian Orthodox Christian. He speaks French, Serbian and English. Vučević holds dual citizenship with both Montenegro and Belgium. On October 2, 2024, Vučević also became a U.S. citizen.

Vučević is a fan of KK Crvena zvezda, FK Crvena zvezda, Juventus and Olympique Lyonnais. On December 27, 2021, he was elected on a five-year term as a member of the Assembly for KK Crvena zvezda.

== Career statistics ==
Legend
GP	Games played	GS	Games started	MPG	Minutes per game
FG%	Field goal percentage	3P%	3-point field goal percentage	FT%	Free throw percentage
RPG	Rebounds per game	APG	Assists per game	SPG	Steals per game
BPG	Blocks per game	PPG	Points per game	**Bold**	Career high

=== NBA ===
==== Regular season ====
Year	Team	GP	GS	MPG	FG%	3P%	FT%	RPG	APG	SPG	BPG	PPG
2011–12	Philadelphia	51	15	15.9	.450	.375	.529	4.8	.6	.4	.7	5.5
2012–13	Orlando	77	77	33.2	.519	.000	.683	11.9	1.9	.8	1.0	13.1
2013–14	Orlando	57	57	31.8	.507	—	.766	11.0	1.8	**1.1**	.8	14.2
2014–15	Orlando	74	74	34.2	.523	.333	.752	10.9	2.0	.7	.7	19.3
2015–16	Orlando	65	60	31.3	.510	.222	.753	8.9	2.8	.8	**1.1**	18.2
2016–17	Orlando	75	55	28.8	.468	.307	.669	10.4	2.8	1.0	1.0	14.6
2017–18	Orlando	57	57	29.5	.475	.315	.819	9.2	3.4	1.0	**1.1**	16.5
2018–19	Orlando	80	80	31.4	.518	.364	.789	**12.0**	3.8	1.0	**1.1**	20.8
2019–20	Orlando	62	62	32.2	.477	.339	.784	10.9	3.6	.9	.8	19.6
2020–21	Orlando	44	44	34.1	.480	**.406**	.827	11.8	3.8	1.0	.6	**24.5**
2020–21	Chicago	26	26	32.6	.471	.388	**.870**	11.5	**3.9**	.9	.8	21.5
2021–22	Chicago	73	73	33.1	.473	.314	.760	11.0	3.2	1.0	1.0	17.6
2022–23	Chicago	**82**	**82**	33.5	.520	.349	.835	11.0	3.2	.7	.7	17.6
2023–24	Chicago	76	74	**34.3**	.484	.294	.822	10.5	3.3	.7	.8	18.0
2024–25	Chicago	73	72	31.2	**.530**	.402	.805	10.1	3.5	.8	.7	18.5
2025–26	Chicago	48	48	30.8	.505	.376	.838	9.0	3.8	.7	.6	16.9
2025–26	Boston	16	1	21.1	.439	.340	.789	6.6	2.0	.4	.6	9.7
Career		1,036	957	31.2	.497	.350	.773	10.3	2.9	.8	.9	17.1
All-Star		2	0	12.5	.500	.200	—	6.0	1.5	1.0	.0	4.5

==== Playoffs ====
Year	Team	GP	GS	MPG	FG%	3P%	FT%	RPG	APG	SPG	BPG	PPG
2012	Philadelphia	1	0	3.0	.000	—	.500	1.0	.0	.0	.0	1.0
2019	Orlando	5	**5**	29.4	.362	.231	.786	8.0	3.0	.4	1.0	11.2
2020	Orlando	5	**5**	**37.0**	**.505**	**.409**	**.909**	11.0	**4.0**	**.8**	.6	**28.0**
2022	Chicago	5	**5**	36.2	.440	.310	.800	**12.4**	3.2	.4	**1.2**	19.4
2026	Boston	**6**	0	19.0	.378	.292	.500	4.3	2.3	.2	.5	6.2
Career		22	15	28.6	.440	.333	.778	8.4	3.0	.4	.8	15.0

=== College ===
Year	Team	GP	GS	MPG	FG%	3P%	FT%	RPG	APG	SPG	BPG	PPG
2008–09	USC	23	3	11.0	**.578**	.000	**.875**	2.7	.3	.4	.4	2.6
2009–10	USC	30	30	32.3	.504	.222	.718	9.4	1.2	**.6**	1.3	10.7
2010–11	USC	**34**	**34**	**34.9**	.505	**.349**	.755	**10.3**	**1.6**	.5	**1.4**	**17.1**
Career		87	67	27.7	.509	.303	.746	8.0	1.1	.5	1.1	11.1

== See also ==
- List of NBA career rebounding leaders
- List of European basketball players in the United States
- List of Montenegrin NBA players
