= Bioče derailment =

2006 railway incident in Montenegro

Coordinates: 42.506°N 19.336°E

- Rescue workers at the site

Details
- Date: January 23, 2006; 4:00 p.m.
- Location: Near Bioče
- Country: Serbia and Montenegro
- Line: Bijelo Polje - Bar
- Operator: Željeznica Crne Gore
- Incident type: Derailment
- Cause: Braking system failure

Statistics
- Trains: 1
- Deaths: 45
- Injured: 184

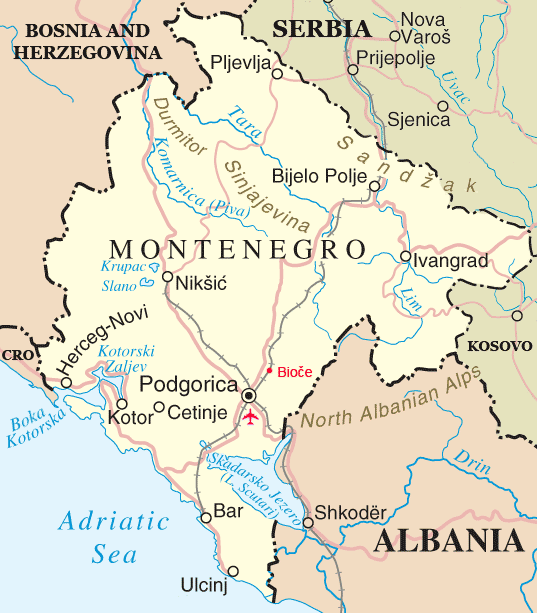
Map of Montenegro showing the site of the Bioče train disaster

The Bioče derailment was a train crash on January 23, 2006 on Belgrade-Bar railway near Bioče, Montenegro (then part of Serbia and Montenegro). At least 45 people, including five children, were killed and another 184 injured. It was the worst train disaster in Montenegrin history.

== Incident ==
The derailment occurred shortly after 16:00 local time (15:00 GMT) about 10 km north of the Montenegrin capital, Podgorica on the Belgrade-Bar railway, renowned as one of the most scenic lines in Europe. A local class 412 train carrying around 300 people from Bijelo Polje in the north of Montenegro to the Adriatic Sea port of Bar derailed above a 100 m-deep ravine above the Morača river, into which it fell. Many of the casualties were said to be children returning from a skiing holiday in the north. Future NBA All-Star center Nikola Vučević, who was traveling with his father on the train, was among the survivors of the derailment.

According to the Montenegrin Interior Minister, Jusuf Kalamperović, the accident was caused by a failure in the braking system. Minister of Transport Andrija Lompar and Director of Montenegro Railways Ranko Medenica immediately resigned over the accident, and train driver Slobodan Drobnjak was arrested on suspicion of negligence.

== Official inquest ==
As soon as he arrived at Podgorica hospital on the night of the disaster, Drobnjak was questioned by the investigative judge Zoran Radović of the Podgorica Elementary Court.

The day after the accident, before the detailed investigation had started and contrary to eye-witness reports that the braking system was faulty, Montenegro Railways executive Momčilo Rakočević suggested that human error was the reason for disaster, blaming Drobnjak explicitly: "According to preliminary, partially incomplete data, it could be said that the accident probably happened because the train operator and the accompanying staff did not follow the operating procedure which should have prevented the train from self-starting down the incline".

Judge Radović said on January 25, 2006 that the "most probable cause of the accident is the failure of braking system". He elaborated, "700 meters before the accident there was no problem with the brakes, the train stopped the way it should. All the facts so far point to the brake failure and further investigation will determine why and how".

That evening he interrogated Drobnjak for three hours in the presence of state prosecutor Veselin Vučković. After the interrogation in a hospital where Drobnjak was awaiting surgery for the shattered hip he suffered in the disaster, judge Radović detained him for one month as the investigation continued.

By January 26, 2006, three days after the accident, there was quite a lot of confusion, with opposing statements. Judge Radović said the investigation could last as long as six months. He also warned Montenegro Railways management to stop making statements that prejudicate the outcome of the investigation. Speaking to the Podgorica daily Pobjeda, he said that the primary goal of his investigation was to determine whether Drobnjak was responsible, but that it would also include wider aspects of railway safety.

On January 27, 2006, Vučković requested that the judge open the investigation against Drobnjak for the "grave endangerment of traffic safety with deadly consequence".

Drobnjak's lawyers, Dragana Vujović and Goran Rodić, appealed against his one-month detention on January 28, 2006: "He was assigned detention on the grounds that he might flee and/or influence witnesses. It is completely ridiculous for the possibility of escape to be declared as grounds for detention in this case. He was operated on yesterday, and long rehabilitation awaits him. And as far as possibility of influencing witnesses goes, he has already been questioned twice in great detail."

== Trial ==
On July 23, 2006, base prosecutor's office in Podgorica indicted 12 employees of Montenegrin Railways.

In November 2007 the courts sentenced Slobodan Drobnjak to six years of imprisonment and freed all 11 other charged personnel from the Railways (among them: executive director Rešad Nuhodžić, executive director of transport Momčilo Rakočević, deputy executive director for traffic affairs Vojo Andrijašević, etc.).

== Public reaction ==
Asked in the wake of Lompar's and Medenica's resignations if the government should resign, deputy Prime Minister Miroslav Ivanišević responded that train accidents occur even in much more developed countries with better infrastructure, adding that the government invested a lot in developing its railway infrastructure.

By Friday January 27, 2006 there were strong reactions to what many perceived to be unjust public singling-out of Drobnjak. The non-governmental organization Group for Changes offered free legal counsel to him and accused Railways of Montenegro of engaging in a public smear campaign with the aim of washing their hands of responsibility by sacrificing an employee.

Even more outrage ensued when a near-accident was reported barely three days after the tragedy. On January 26, 2006 morning train 6151 from Podgorica arrived at Bar with a cracked wheel on the locomotive.

The verdict was met with public outrage as after the trial in front of the court there were people yelling and elderly women, cousins of some of those killed, crying. The event has been characterized as another state affair of the Democratic Party of Socialists of Montenegro.

== See also ==
- List of rail accidents (2000–present)
- List of rail accidents in Yugoslavia

== Sources ==
- "Dozens dead in Balkan train crash", BBC News Online, January 23, 2006
- "39 Dead in Montenegro Train Crash", CNN, January 23, 2006
- "CG: Najmanje 41 poginuo i 5 dece", B92, January 23, 2006
