= Joža Šeligo =

Slovene poet

- Born: August 3, 1911; Preserje, Austria-Hungary (now in Slovenia)
- Died: 10 June 1941 (aged 29); Ljubljana, Slovenia
- Occupation: Poet

Joža Šeligo (August 3, 1911 – June 10, 1941) was a Slovene poet.

Šeligo was born in Preserje, the son of Josip Šeligo and Terezija (née Ula) Šeligo. He studied Slavic languages in Ljubljana, and then law but he subsequently dropped out from school before graduation. Šeligo started writing poems in high school and published them in the handwritten student newspaper Škorec. As a university student, he was the technical editor of the journal 1551, and he was a founding member of the Slovenian Club (Slovene: Slovenski klub). In 1936 he started publishing poetry in the journals Ljubljanski zvon and Sodobnost. He married Ana Žitko in 1939, and the couple had two daughters, Ana and Terezija. Šeligo obtained a job as a forest worker near Stražišče, and during this time he published his debut poetry collection Cesta (The Road), which contained 28 previous published poems and nine new ones. Šeligo started working for the Railway Directorate in Ljubljana in 1941, and he and his family relocated to Preserje. There he fell into a fit of depression and committed suicide on June 10, 1941.

Šeligo's poetry has a melancholy and resigned character, and is characterized by themes of homelessness, alienation, difference, and loneliness.
