= Zagreb train disaster =

Train accident in 1974

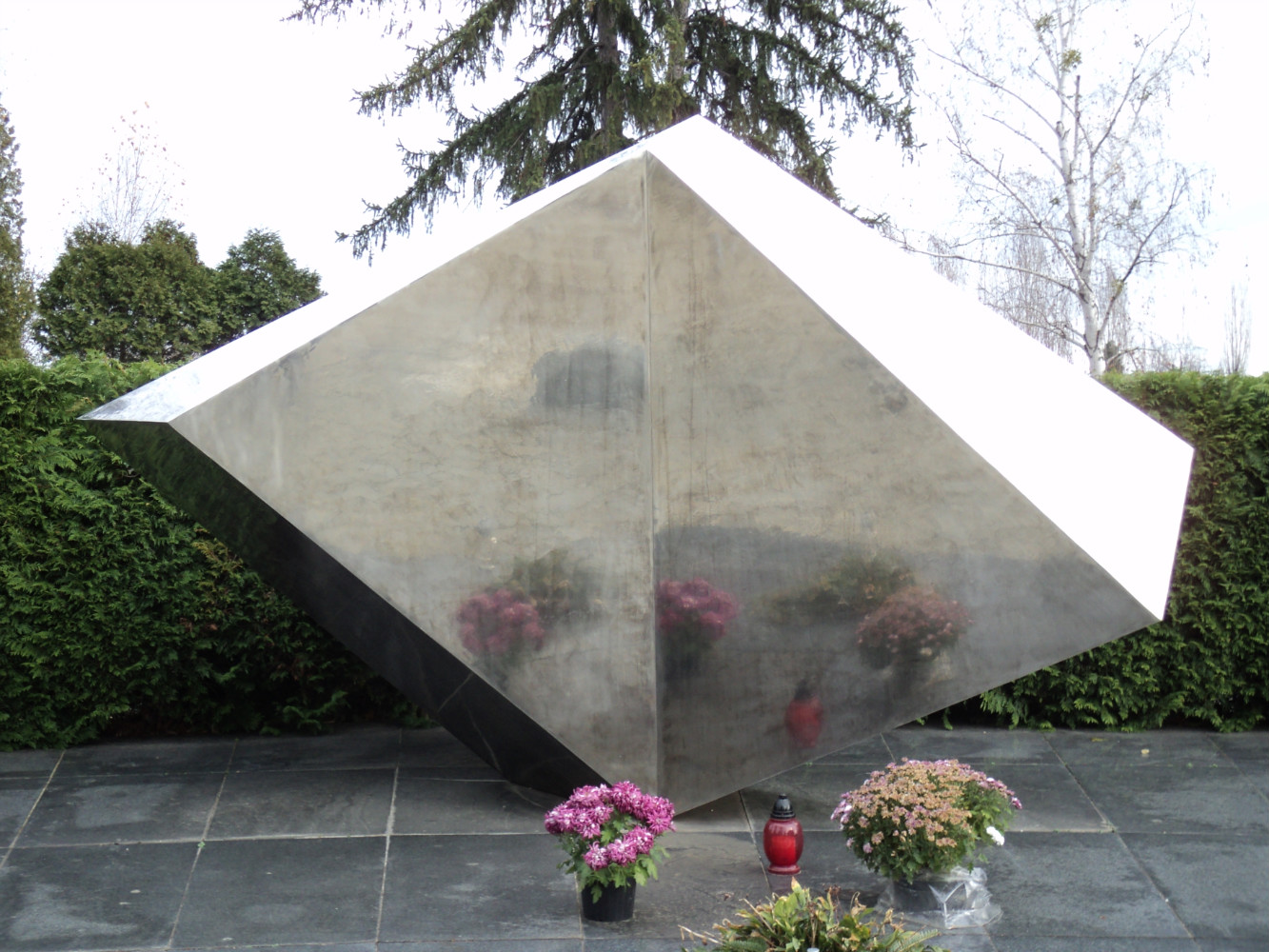
- Monument to victims of the train accident at the Mirogoj Cemetery, by Vojin Bakić

Details
- Date: 30 August 1974; 22:40
- Location: Zagreb
- Coordinates: 45°48′18″N 15°59′18″E
- Country: Yugoslavia
- Line: Belgrade-Dortmund
- Operator: Yugoslav Railways
- Incident type: Derailment
- Cause: Excessive speed

Statistics
- Trains: 1
- Passengers: 400
- Deaths: 153
- Injured: 60

The Zagreb train disaster occurred on 30 August 1974 when an express train (number 10410) traveling from Belgrade, Yugoslavia, to Dortmund, West Germany, derailed before entering Zagreb Main Station (Croatia), killing 153 people. It was the worst rail accident in Yugoslavia's history and remains one of the worst in Europe's history.

== The accident ==
The accident occurred when all nine cars from a passenger express train derailed and rolled over at the entrance to Zagreb's main train station, 719 m (2,359 ft) from the entrance to Track IIa. At 22:33 hours the locomotive entered the station via Track IIa without any of its carriages.

Many of the passengers died immediately; as many as 41 who could not be identified were buried in a common grave at the Mirogoj Cemetery.

The surviving passengers reported that the train had not slowed while passing through the stations at Ludina and Novoselec, about an hour before reaching Zagreb Main Station, and that it had been leaning dangerously.

The passengers were mainly gastarbeiters (guest workers) working in West Germany and their families, which included many children. The driver and driver's assistant were uninjured, and the locomotive remained intact. The locomotive is now on display in the Croatian Railway Museum.

The train was scheduled to arrive in Zagreb from Vinkovci at 19:45 local time. The driver, Nikola Knežević, and his assistant, Stjepan Varga, were both exhausted, having worked for two full days.

== Investigation ==
A subsequent investigation into the accident showed that the train had exceeded the speed limit by nearly 70 km/h (43 mph) at several points, so that instead of entering the station at the speed limit of 40 km/h (25 mph), the train had been traveling at a speed of 104 km/h (65 mph). The crew also applied the brakes too late, so that the train quickly derailed into an unrecognizable wreck.

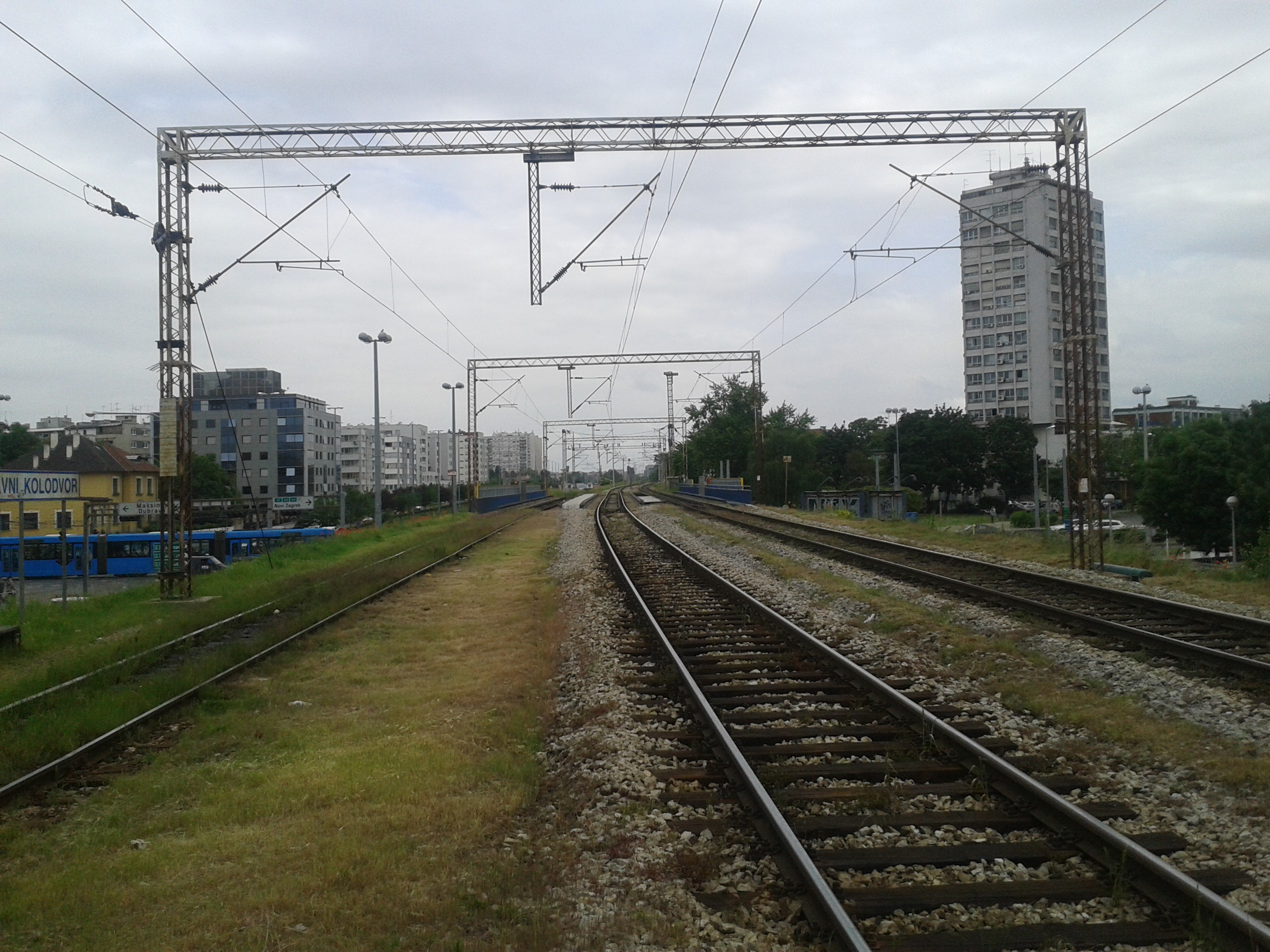
The view to the east from Strojarska Road overpass, the direction from which the train came.

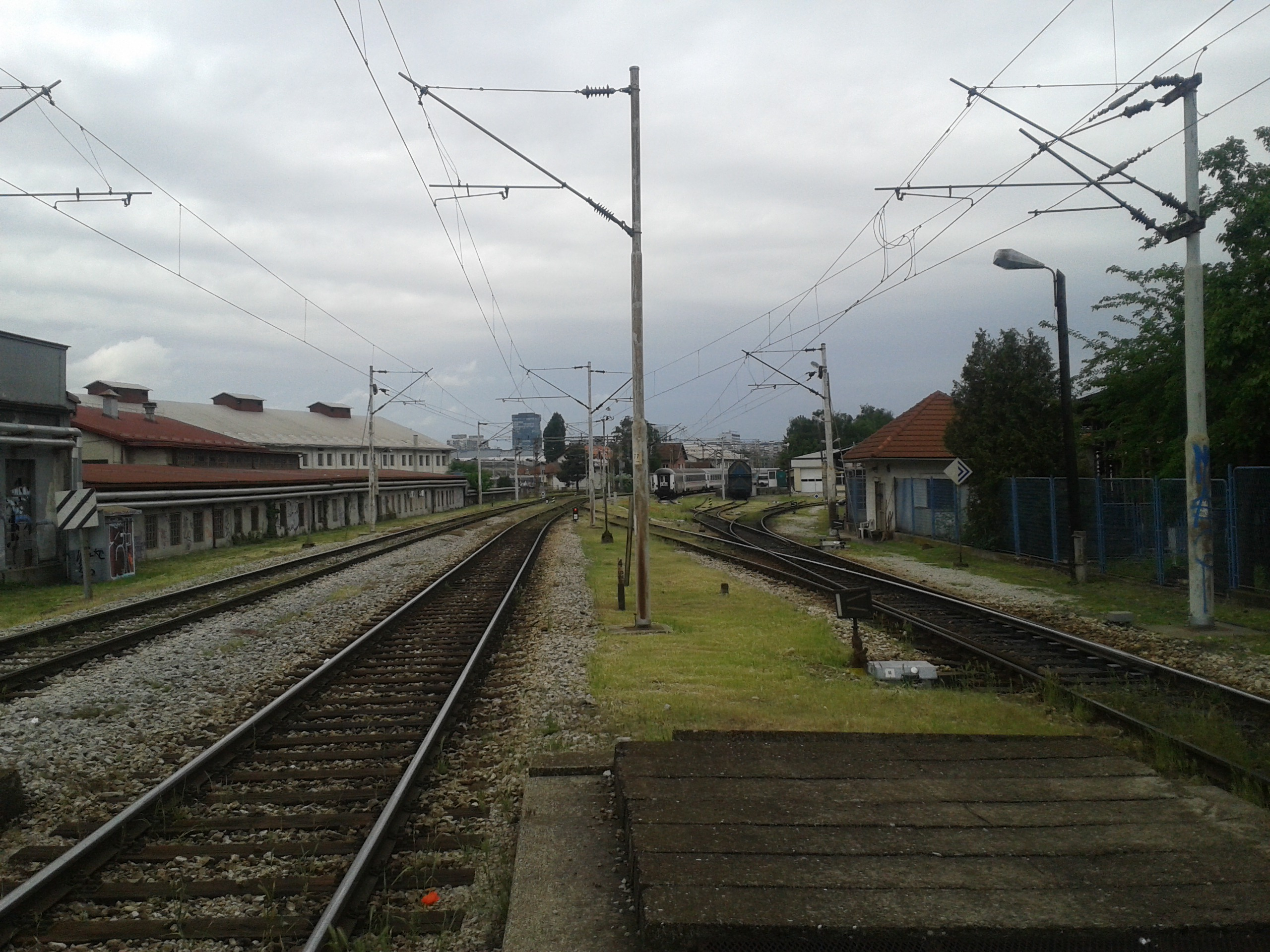
The view to the west from Strojarska Road overpass. The crash site is located about 300 m (980 ft) away, 150 m (490 ft) behind the carriages in the centre of the picture.

== Aftermath ==
The engineer was sentenced to 15 years imprisonment, and his assistant to eight years. The court upheld their sentence due to the duo working the previous 52 hours as a mitigating circumstance in the accident.

== See also ==
- List of rail accidents in Yugoslavia
