= Kamnik pod Krimom =

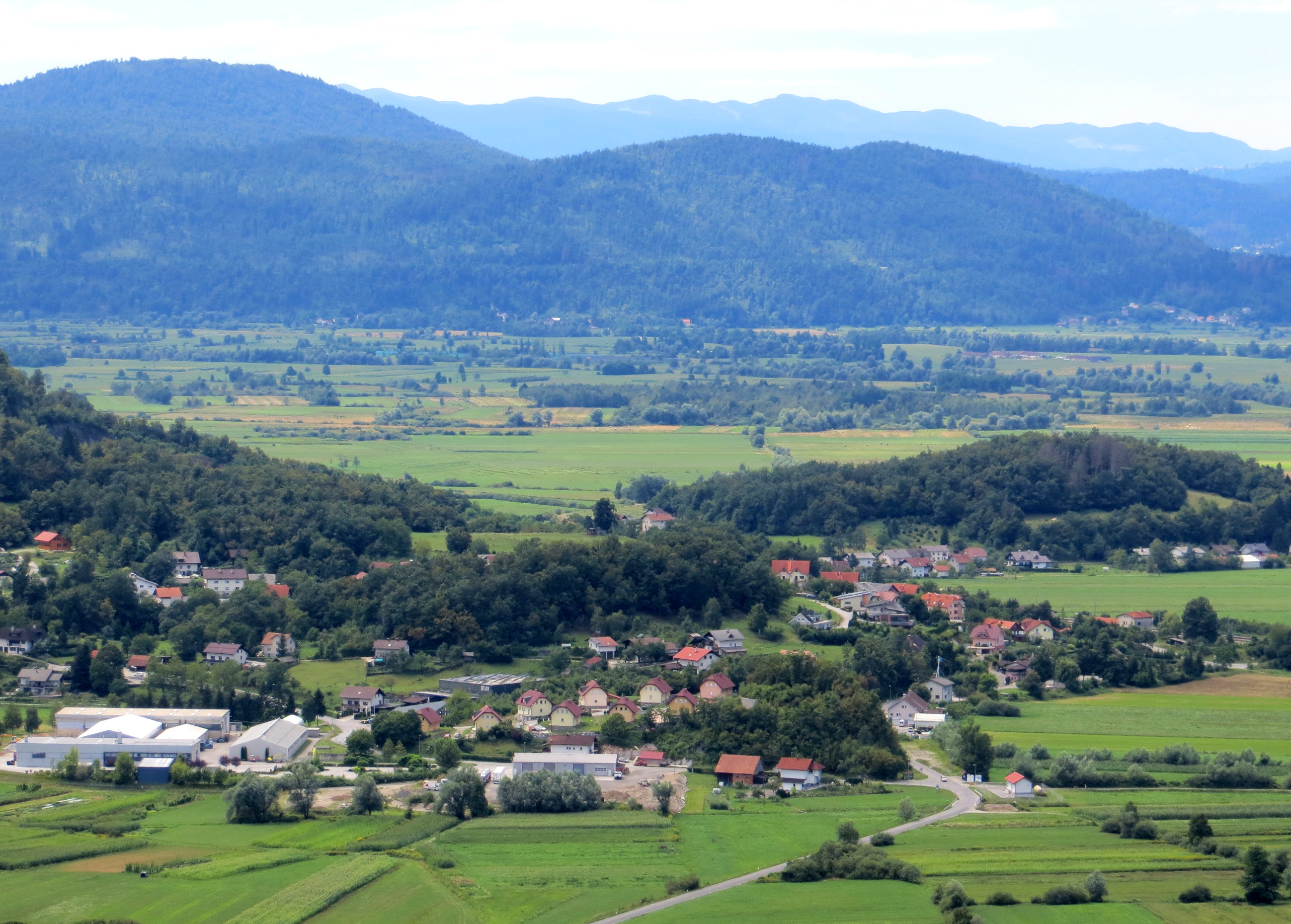

- Location in Slovenia
- Coordinates: 45°57′24.85″N 14°24′28.25″E
- Country: Slovenia
- Traditional region: Inner Carniola
- Statistical region: Central Slovenia
- Municipality: Brezovica

Area
  - Total: 8.37 km^{2} (3.23 sq mi)
- Elevation: 339.1 m (1,113 ft)

Population (2020)
  - Total: 974
  - Density: 116/km^{2} (301/sq mi)
- Postal code: 1352

Kamnik pod Krimom (pronounced [ˈkaːmnik pɔt ˈkɾiːmɔm]; German: Stein) is a village in the Municipality of Brezovica in central Slovenia. It lies on the edge of the marshlands south of the capital Ljubljana. The municipality is part of the traditional region of Inner Carniola and is now included in the Central Slovenia Statistical Region.

== Name ==
Kamnik was attested in 1143 as Stein (and as Stain in 1147 and Steine in 1205). The Slovene name was originally *Kam(en)ьnikъ, derived from the adjective form of the noun *kamy (accusative *kamenь) 'stone', referring to rocky terrain. The name of the settlement was changed from Kamnik to Kamnik pod Krimom (literally, 'Kamnik below Mount Krim') in 1953.

== Church ==
The local church, built in the centre of the village, is dedicated to Saint Florian and belongs to the Parish of Preserje. It was first mentioned in written documents dating to 1526, and was restyled in the 18th century.
