= Ovčari =

Ovčari Овчари
- Village
- Location within Bosnia and Herzegovina
- Country: Bosnia and Herzegovina
- Entity: Federation of Bosnia and Herzegovina
- Canton: Herzegovina-Neretva
- Municipality: Konjic

Area
  - Total: 0.73 sq mi (1.89 km^{2})

Population (2013)
  - Total: 488
  - Density: 669/sq mi (258/km^{2})
- Time zone: UTC+1 (CET)
  - Summer (DST): UTC+2 (CEST)

Ovčari (Cyrillic: Овчари) is a village in the municipality of Konjic, Bosnia and Herzegovina.

== Demographics ==
According to the 2013 census, its population was 488.

Ethnicity in 2013
Ethnicity	Number	Percentage
Bosniaks	373	76.4%
Croats	90	18.4%
Serbs	7	1.4%
other/undeclared	18	3.7%
Total	488	100%
