= Nekodim =

Village in Kosovo

- Village
- Location within Kosovo Location within Europe
- Coordinates: 42°20′57″N 21°10′22″E
- Country: Kosovo
- District: Ferizaj
- Municipality: Ferizaj

Population (2024)
  - Total: 3,539
- Time zone: UTC+1 (CET)
  - Summer (DST): UTC+2 (CEST)

Nekodim is a village in Ferizaj Municipality, Kosovo. According to the Kosovo Agency of Statistics (KAS) from the 2024 census, there were 3,539 people residing in Nekodim, with Albanians constituting the majority of the population.

== History ==
On September 12–13, 1943, during World War II, many of the village's Serb civilian population were murdered by Albanian paramilitaries.
