= Preserje, Brezovica =

Preserje
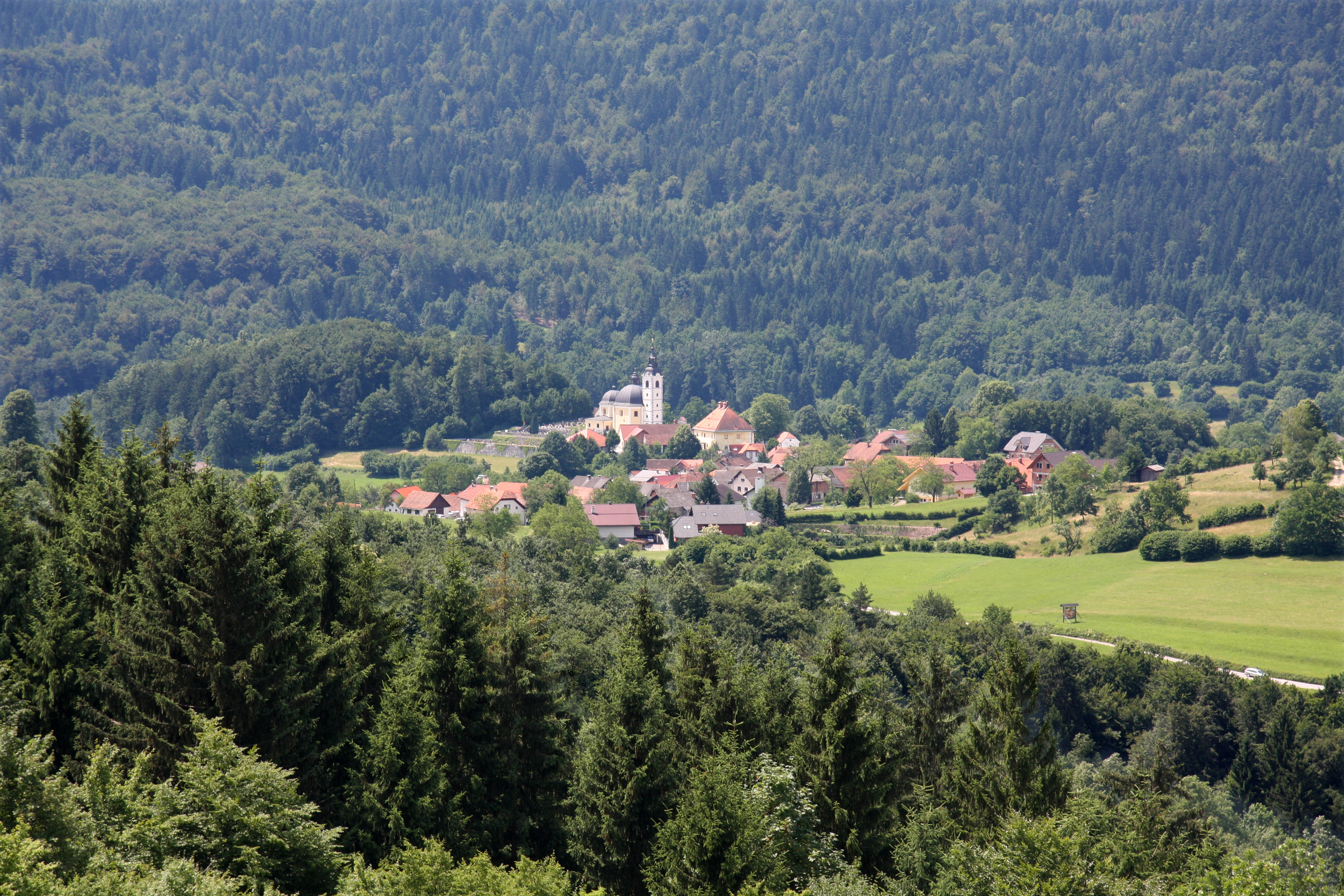

- Location in Slovenia
- Coordinates: 45°57′24.39″N 14°25′5.41″E
- Country: Slovenia
- Traditional region: Inner Carniola
- Statistical region: Central Slovenia
- Municipality: Brezovica

Area
  - Total: 1.24 km^{2} (0.48 sq mi)
- Elevation: 359.2 m (1,178 ft)

Population (2020)
  - Total: 386
  - Density: 311/km^{2} (806/sq mi)
- Postal code: 1352

Preserje (pronounced [ˈpɾeːsɛɾjɛ]; in older sources Presar, German: Presser) is a village in the Municipality of Brezovica in central Slovenia. It lies immediately east of Kamnik pod Krimom. The entire municipality is part of the traditional region of Inner Carniola and is now included in the Central Slovenia Statistical Region. It includes the hamlet of Učne to the east on the slope of Špilj Hill (525 m).

== Name ==
The name Preserje occurs multiple times in Slovenian toponymy; unlike other examples of the name (e.g., Preserje, Preserje pri Komnu, etc.), which are feminine plural nouns, this Preserje is a neuter singular. The origin of the name is uncertain. Possibilities are that it is derived from *Prě-syrьje 'place before a damp area, place before a swamp', *Prěsěrьje 'place before an area singed by heat', or *Prěsterьje 'place for drying flax'.

== History ==
Church-sponsored schooling on Sundays was held in Preserje from 1835 to 1854; after this, regular schooling was instituted. During the Second World War, in July 1942 Italian forces burned three houses in the village.

== Churches ==
There are two churches near the settlement. On a hill to the northwest of the settlement is a 17th-century church dedicated to Saint Joseph. The parish church, on the southern outskirts of the settlement next to the local cemetery, is dedicated to Saint Vitus and was built in 1711.

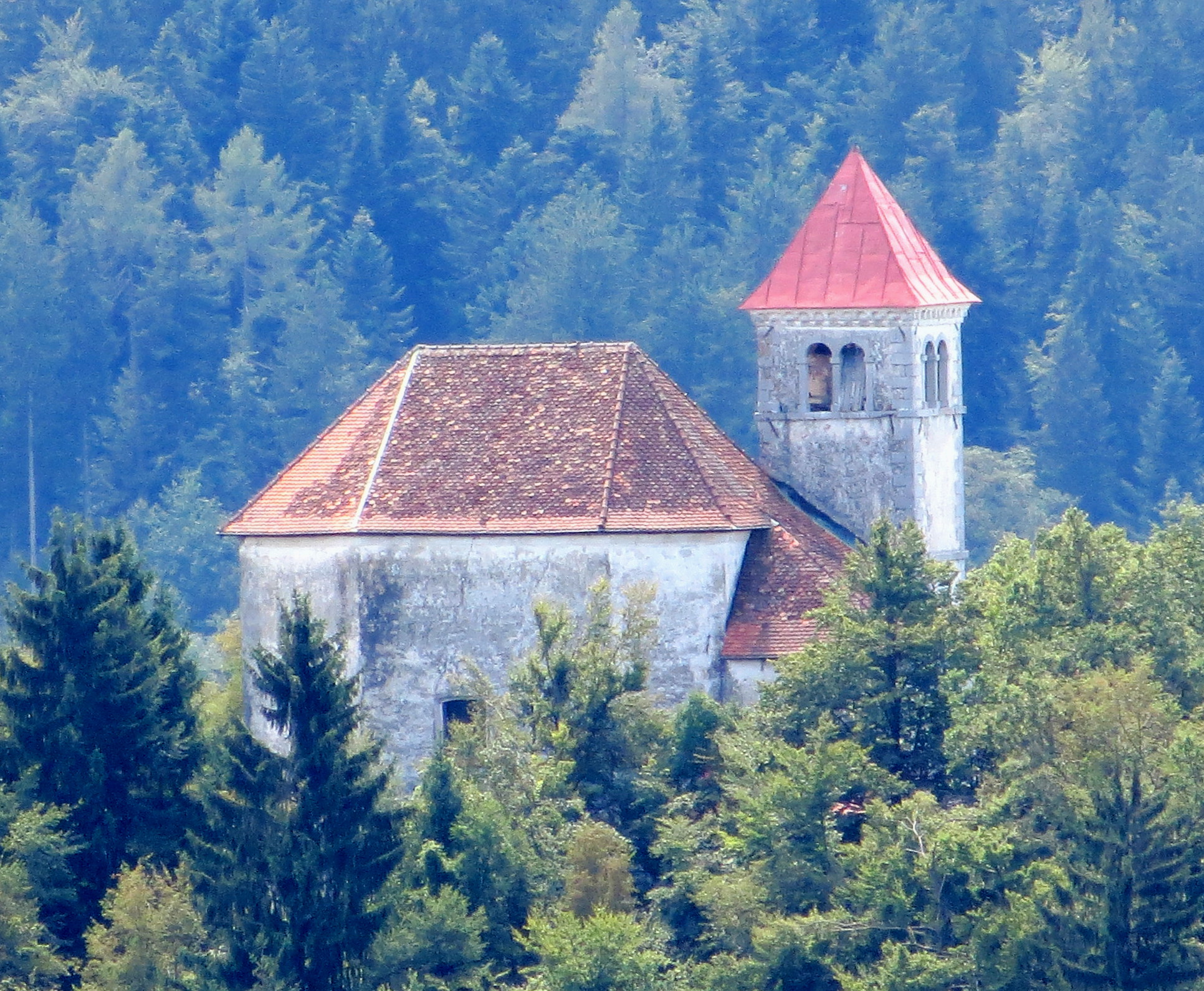
Saint Joseph's Church

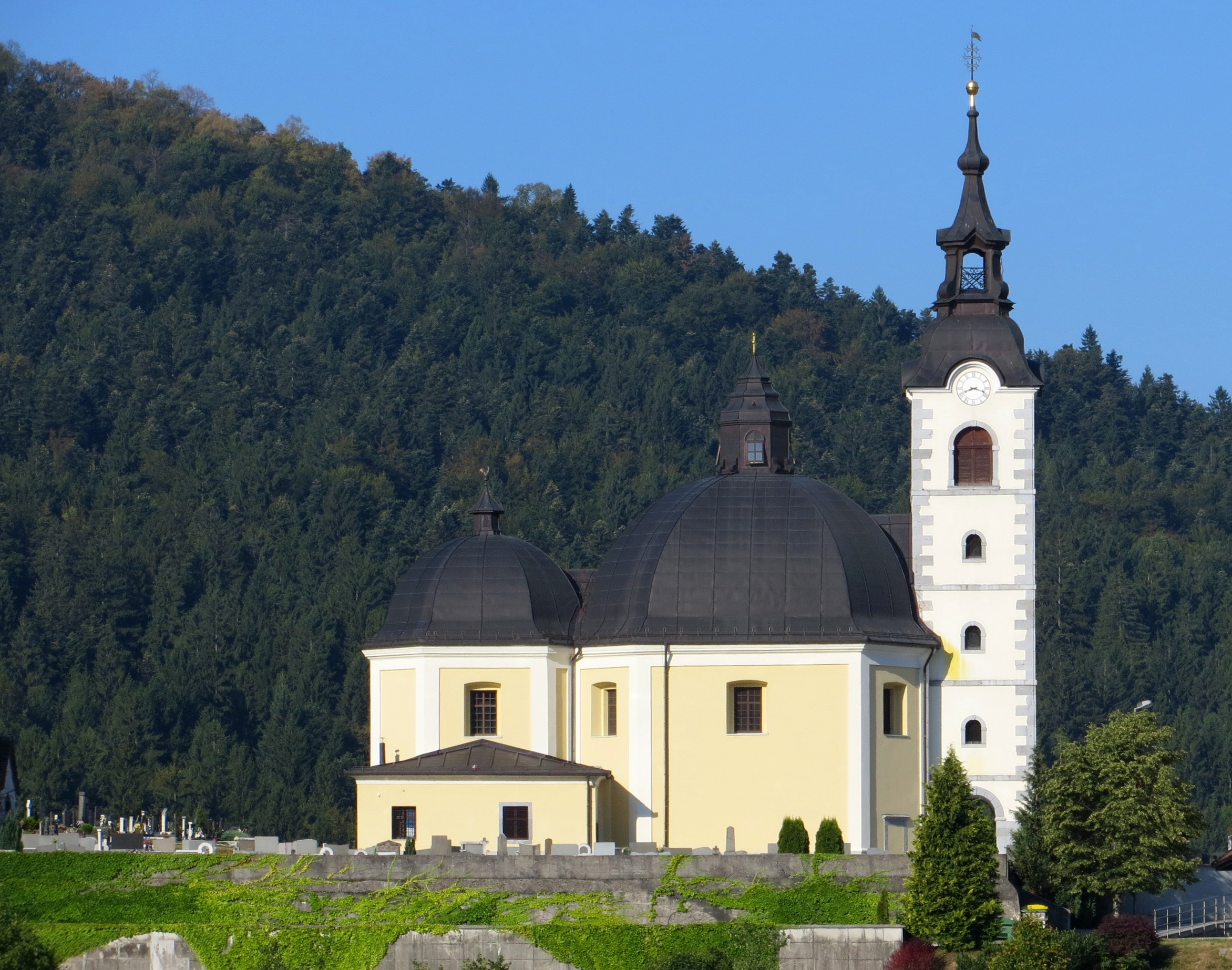
Saint Vitus' Church from the east

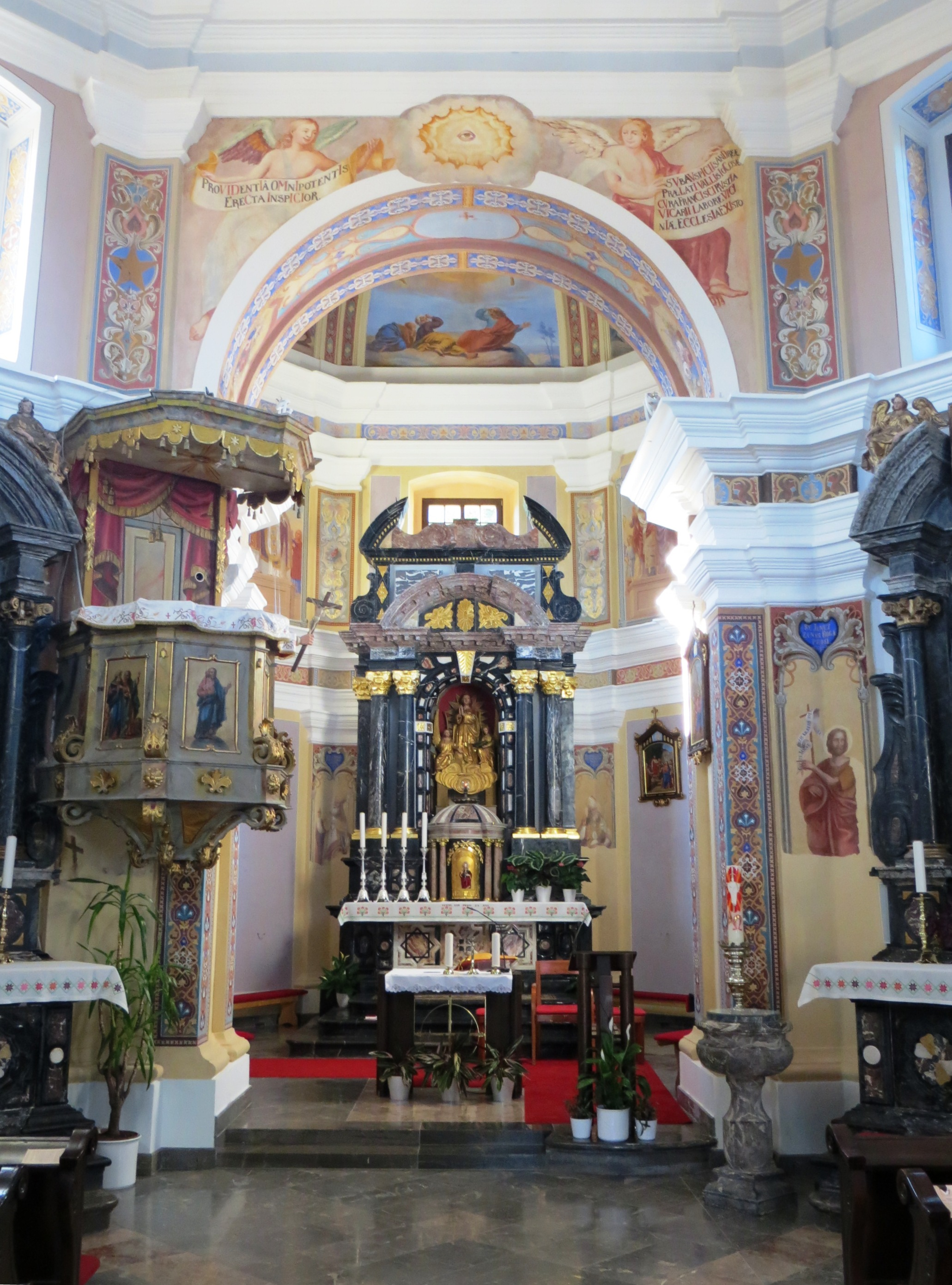
Arch and chancel of Saint Vitus' Church

== Notable people ==
Notable people that were born or lived in Preserje include:

- Joža Šeligo (1911–1941), poet
- Kazimir Zakrajšek (1878–1958), priest, poet, writer, playwright, and editor
- Leon Zakrajšek (1887–1963), editor and journalist
- Živa Vadnov (born 1982), Miss Slovenia 2004
