= Podvis (Knjaževac) =

Coordinates: 43°32′50″N 22°11′22″E

- Village
- Interactive map of Podvis
- Country: Serbia
- District: Zaječar District
- Municipality: Knjaževac

Population (2002)
  - Total: 369
- Time zone: UTC+1 (CET)
  - Summer (DST): UTC+2 (CEST)

Podvis is a village in the municipality of Knjaževac, Serbia. According to the 2002 census, the village has a population of 369 people.
