= Braljina (Ražanj) =

Braljina Браљина
- Village
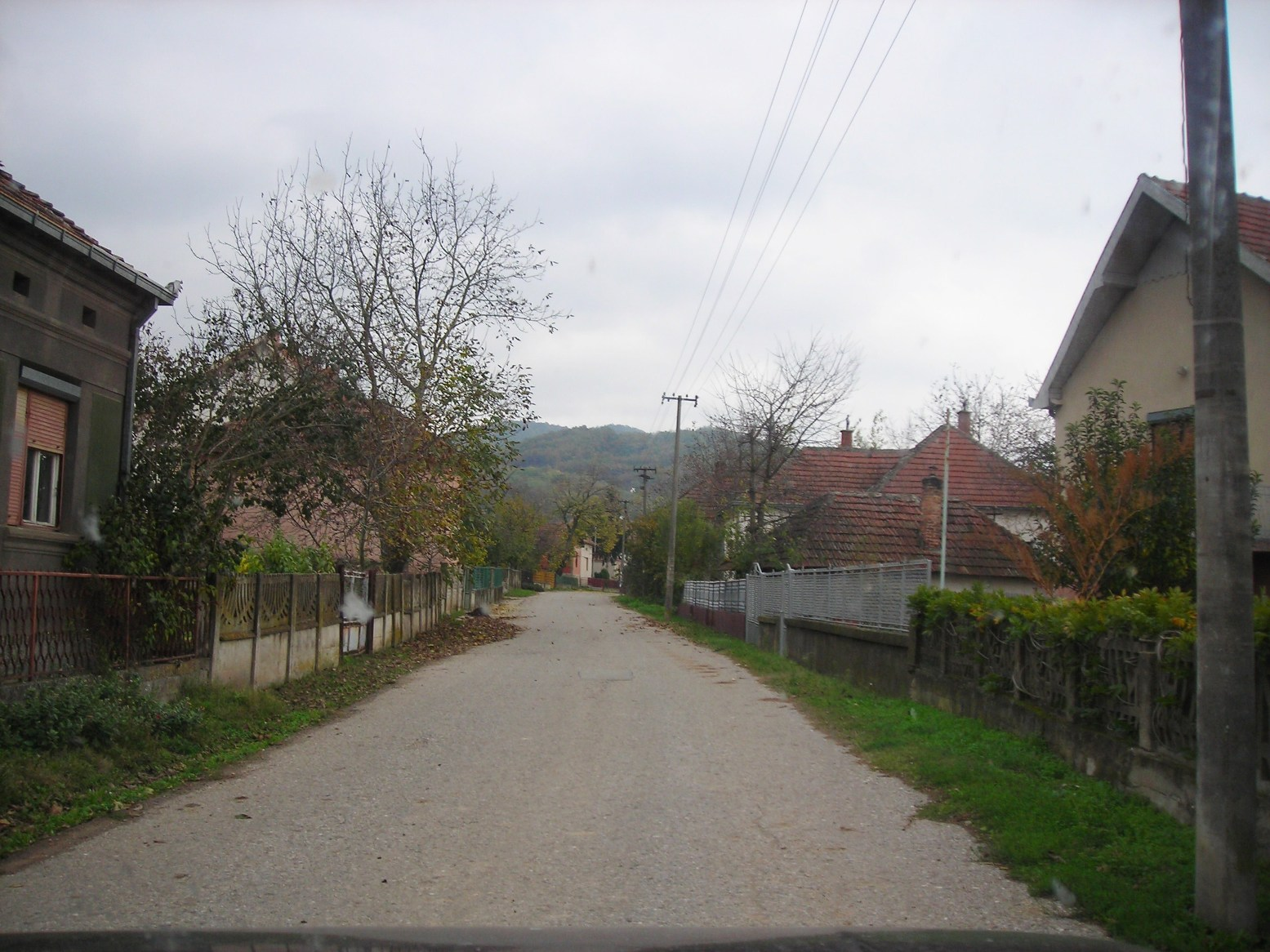

- Location in Serbia
- Country: Serbia
- District: Nišava District
- Municipality: Ražanj

Population (2002)
  - Total: 266
- Time zone: UTC+1 (CET)
  - Summer (DST): UTC+2 (CEST)

Braljina is a village in the municipality of Ražanj, Serbia. According to the 2002 census, the village has a population of 266 people.

== Demographics ==
In the village Braljina live 248 adult inhabitants, and the average age is 59.9 years (56.3 for men and 62.7 for women). The village has 143 households, and the average number of occupants per household is 1.86. This village is largely populated by Serbs (according to the census of 2002) and in the last three censuses, there was a decline in population.
