= Vranovci, Vrapčište =

Vranovci Врановци Vranoc
- Village
- Location within North Macedonia
- Coordinates: 41°50′N 20°52′E
- Country: North Macedonia
- Region: Polog
- Municipality: Vrapčište

Population (2021)
  - Total: 312
- Time zone: UTC+1 (CET)
  - Summer (DST): UTC+2 (CEST)
- Car plates: GV
- Website: .

Vranovci (Macedonian: Врановци, Albanian: Vranoc) is a village in the municipality of Vrapčište, North Macedonia.

== Demographics ==
As of the 2021 census, Vranovci had 312 residents with the following ethnic composition:

- Albanians 303
- Persons for whom data are taken from administrative sources 9

According to the 2002 census, the village had a total of 480 inhabitants. Ethnic groups in the village include:

- Albanians 477
- Turks 2
- Others 1

In statistics gathered by Vasil Kanchov in 1900, the village of Vranovci was inhabited by 244 Muslim Bulgarians.
