= Spielfeld-Straß railway station =

Railway station in Styria, Austria

Spielfeld-Straß
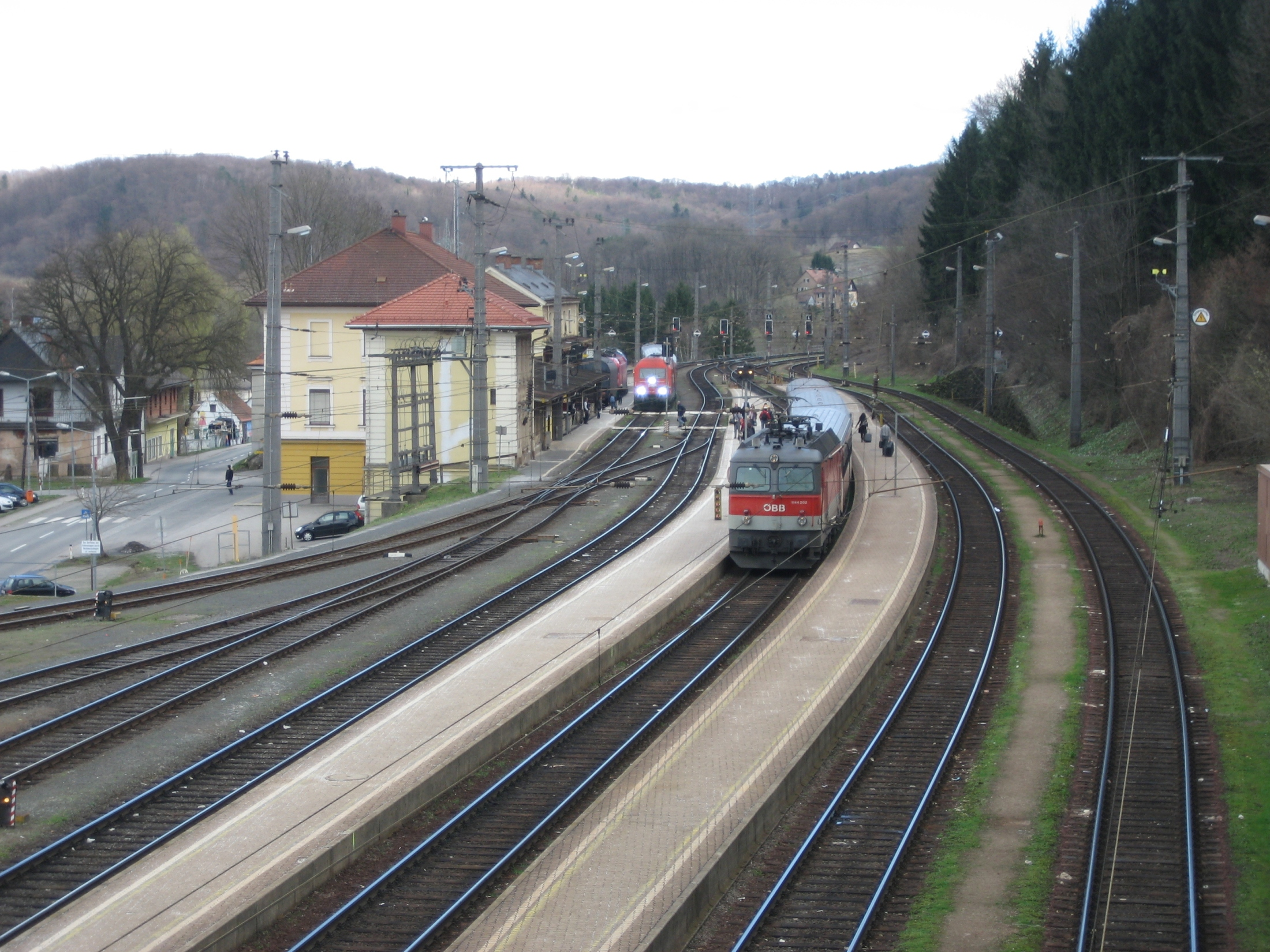

General information
- Location: Spielfeld, Straß in Steiermark; Austria
- Coordinates: 46°42′35″N 15°37′45″E
- Elevation: 263
- Owner: Austrian Federal Railways (ÖBB)
- Operator: ÖBB
- Lines: Southern Railway; Spielfeld-Straß–Trieste railway; Radkersburg Railway
- Platforms: 4

Other information
- Station code: 8100082

History
- Opened: 1848

Services
Preceding station	EuroCity	Following station
Maribor towards Trieste Centrale	EuroCity	Leibnitz towards Wien Hbf
Maribor towards Zagreb Glavni kolodvor	EuroCity	Leibnitz towards Wien Hbf
Preceding station	MÁV START	Following station
Maribor towards Ljubljana	InterCity	Leibnitz towards Budapest Keleti
Preceding station	Slovenian Railways	Following station
Maribor Terminus	InterCity Slovenija	Terminus
Maribor Terminus	Regional	Terminus
Preceding station	Styria S-Bahn	Following station
Ehrenhausen towards Graz Hbf	S5	Terminus
Ehrenhausen towards Graz Hbf	S51	Lichendorf towards Bad Radkersburg
Location
- Location within Austria

Spielfeld-Straß station is a border station on the Southern Railway and the line to Trieste in Straß in Steiermark, in southern Steiermark by the Austrian- Slovenian border. Next to the ÖBB station, there is also an office staffed by Slovenian Railways (Slovenske železnice, SŽ), which calls the station Špilje.

== Location ==
The station is located in Spielfeld, on the right (south) bank of the Mur and is about 2.2 km from the national border and 4.5 km from the Slovenian border station of Šentilj. The town of Straß in Steiermark, which the station is partly named after, is located about two kilometres north of the station.

The station is 257.9 km from Vienna on the Southern Railway and 615 km from Belgrade on the Spielfeld-Straß–Trieste railway and 263m above sea level. The station is also the starting point of the Radkersburg Railway, which runs to the east over the Mur Bridge to Bad Radkersburg.

All international trains used to stop in Spielfeld-Straß for passport control and to change staff between 1918 and December 2007, when Slovenia joined the Schengen Agreement. Customs controls ended in May 2004.

== Passenger services ==
The following national services run towards Graz and Bad Radkersburg (ÖBB):

- S-Bahn line S5 to Graz Hbf
- S-Bahn S51 to Bad Radkersburg
- REX (Regional-Express): Graz Hbf–Spielfeld-Straß(–Bad Radkersburg)

The following national service runs towards Maribor (SŽ):

- LP/LPV (Regional services): Spielfeld-Straß–Maribor(–Ruše/–Zidani Most)

The following international services operate:

- EuroCity Emona: Vienna–Ljubljana and return
- EuroCity Croatia: Vienna–Zagreb and return

== Infrastructure ==
In addition to the station building with a platform (platform 1), the station complex has two uncovered and comparatively narrow island platforms (2/3 and 4/5) with access via a pedestrian level-crossing that leads to a total of four passenger tracks. A fifth track serves as a freight track. The former customs building, which also housed the SŽ's premises, was demolished between 2012 and 2015. Another historical building at the northern end of platform 1 was restored as a replacement for SŽ staff.

There is a Park and ride facility at the station with parking spaces for 80 cars, 10 motorbikes and 50 bicycles.

The station has a ticket machine, a waiting room and public toilets. The station is partially accessible for the handicapped.

The railway line has been single-track between Leibnitz and Maribor since reparations were paid to the Soviet Union at the end of the Second World War.

=== Electrification system ===
The line between Graz and Spielfeld-Straß was electrified in May 1972. The line across the national border to Maribor was electrified in May 1977. The overhead line system complies with Austrian standards. The system separation points between the Austrian network electrified at 15 kV 16.7 Hz AC and the Slovenian network electrified at 3 kV DC are located in Spielfeld-Straß station.

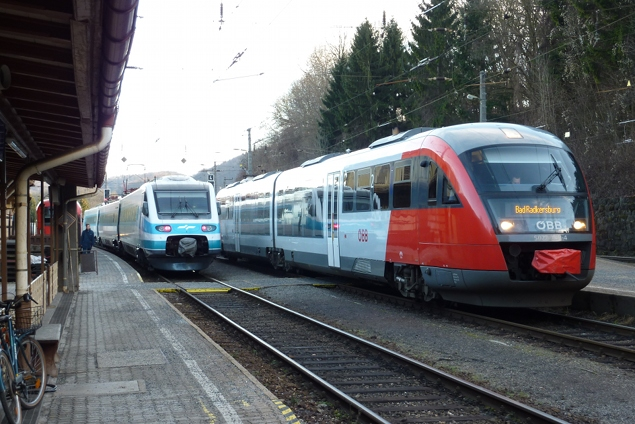
The InterCity Slovenija Pendolino and an S-Bahn S51 service next to each other in Spielfeld-Straß station, photographed from the north. The main platform can be seen on the far left. (2012)

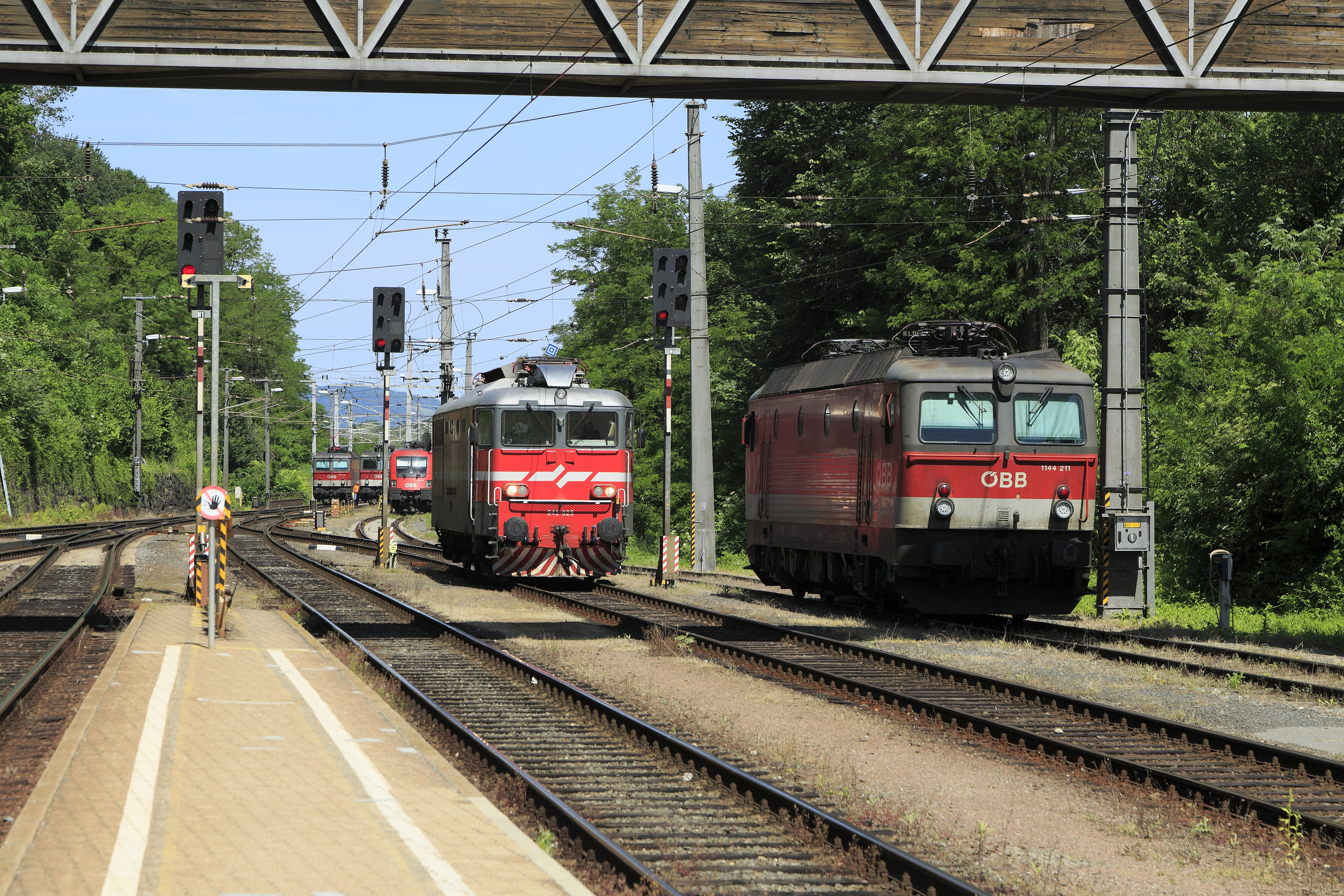
The ÖBB class 1144 locomotive has pulled the Slovenian SŽ 342 off the train and pushed it into an open track, the engine runs back under the DC catenary with momentum.

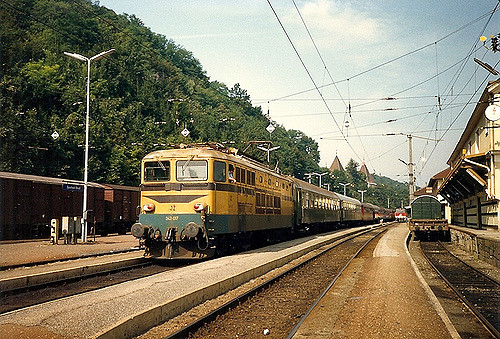
An SŽ 342 at Spielfeld-Straß.

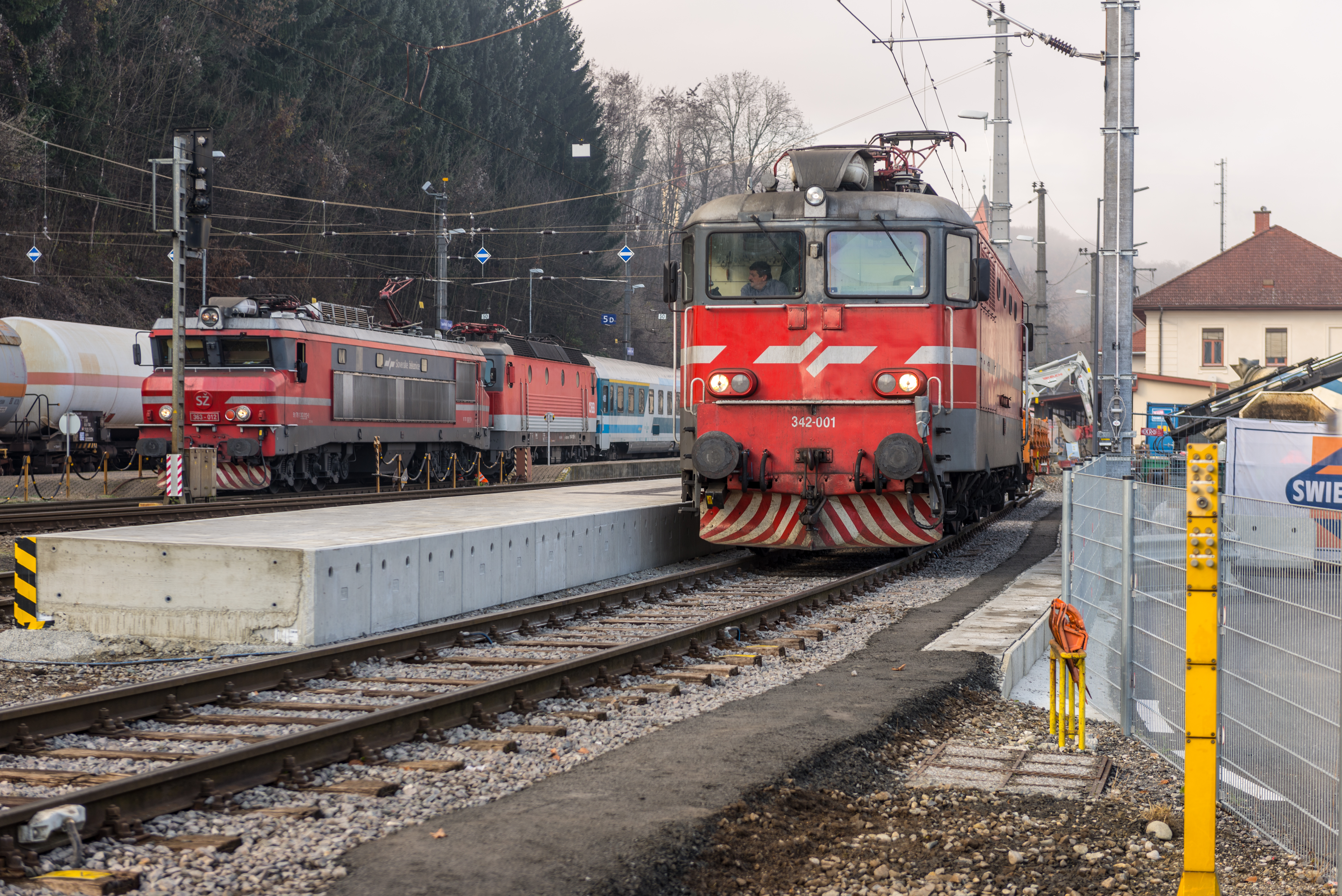
An SŽ 342 and SŽ 363 locomotive in Spielfeld-Straß (2015)

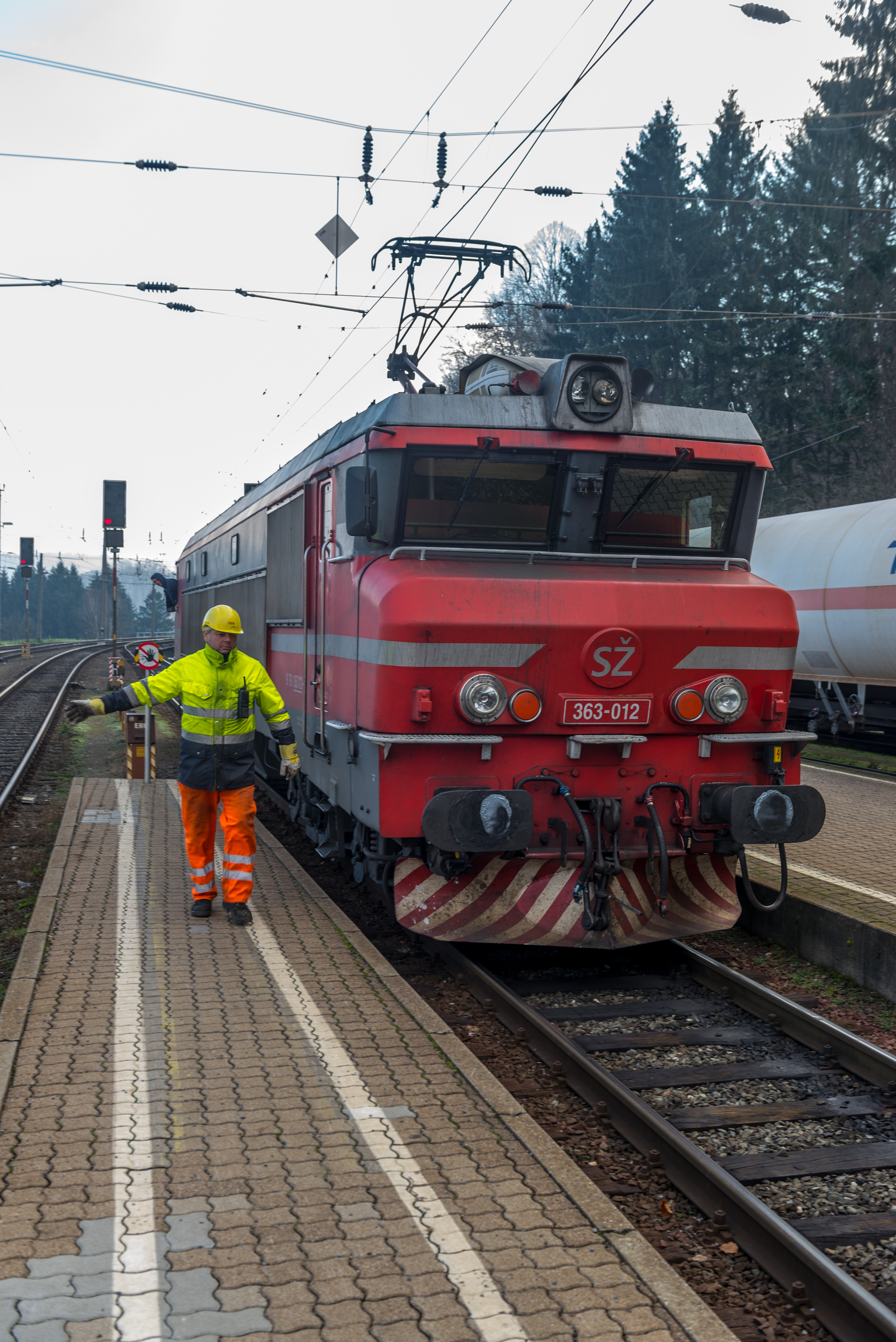
An SŽ 363 locomotive is coupled to a EuroCity (2015)

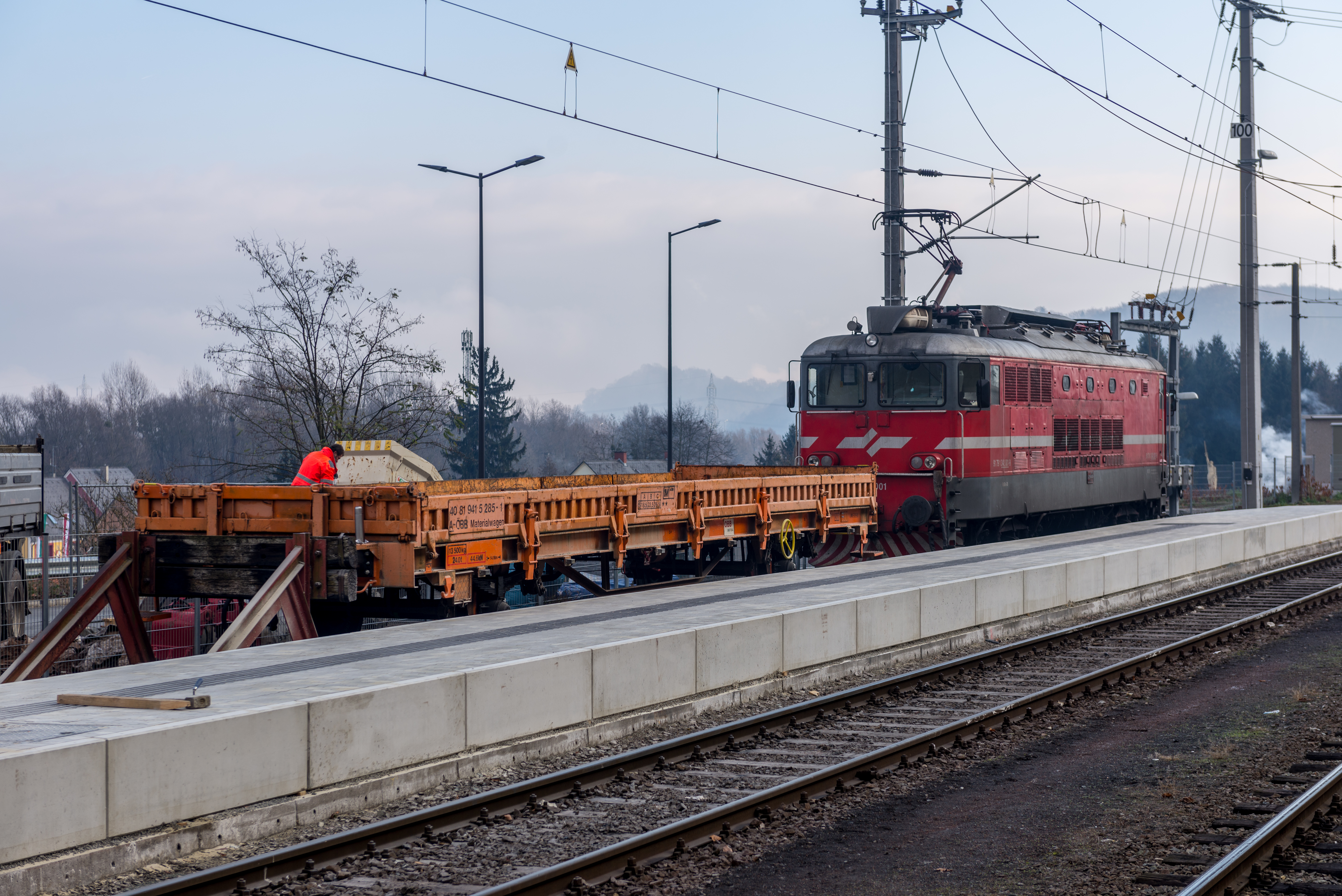
An SŽ 342 with an ÖBB wagon.
