= Austrian Southern Railway =

Railway from Vienna to the Adriatic

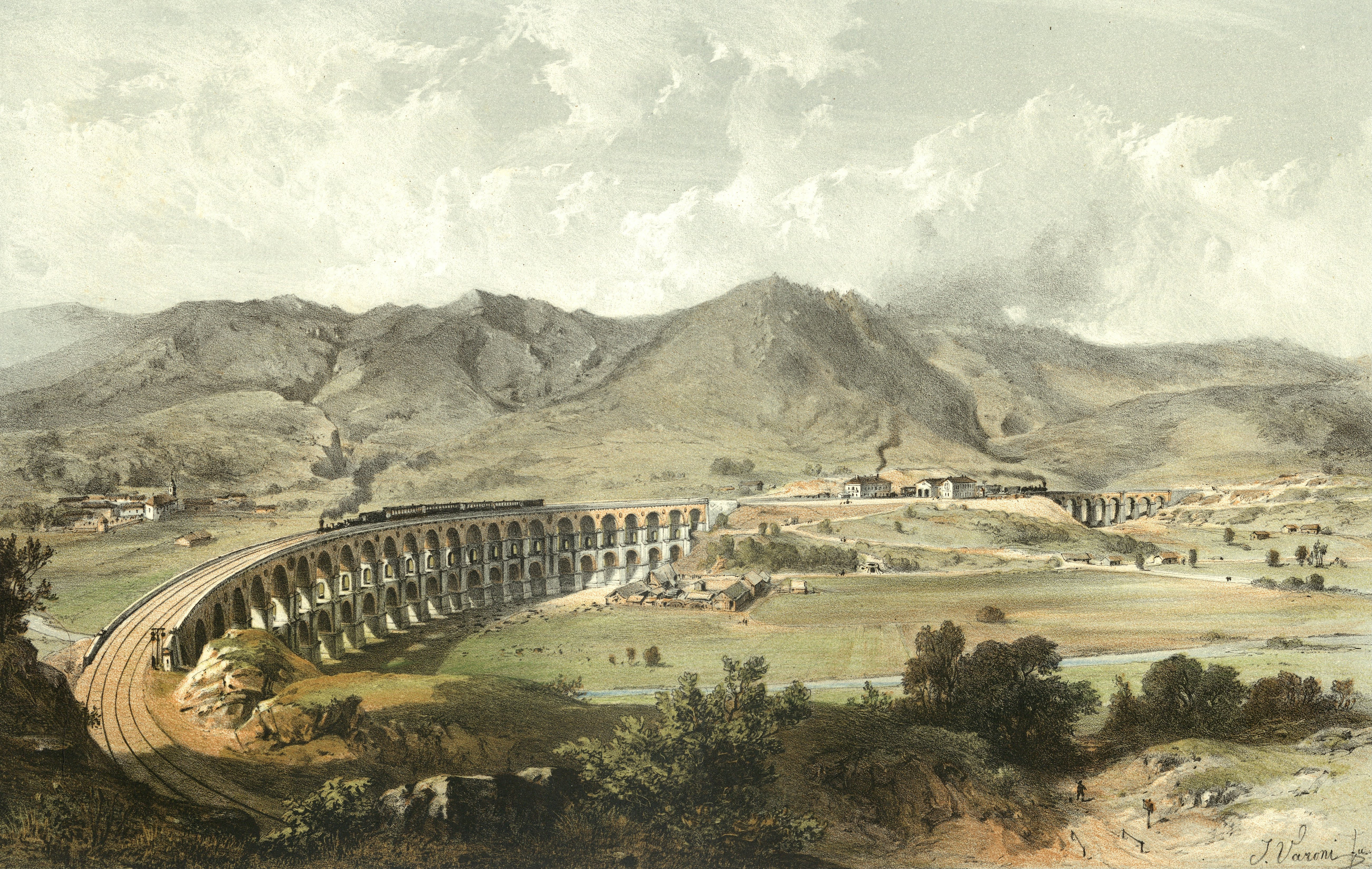

Overview
- Native name: Südbahn
- Status: Operational
- Termini: Wien Südbahnhof; Trieste Centrale railway station

Service
- Type: Heavy rail, Passenger/Freight rail Regional rail
- Operator(s): Austrian Federal Railways; Slovenske Železnice; Rete Ferroviaria Italiana

History
- Opened: Stages between 1841 and 1857

Technical
- Line length: 577.2 km (358.7 mi)
- Number of tracks: Double track
- Track gauge: 1,435 mm (4 ft 8 1/2 in) standard gauge
- Minimum radius: 171 m
- Electrification: 15 kV/16,7 Hz AC Overhead line (Austria); 3 kV DC Overhead line (Slovenia and Italy)
- Maximum incline: 2.8%

The Austrian Southern Railway (German: Österreichische Südbahn) is a 577.2-kilometre (358.7 mi) long double track railway, which linked the capital Vienna with Trieste, the former main seaport of Austria-Hungary, by railway for the first time. It now forms the Southern Railway in Austria and the Spielfeld-Straß–Trieste railway in Slovenia and Italy.

== Construction and history ==
Section	Opening
Wiener Neustadt-Baden	16 March 1841
Baden-Mödling	29 March 1841
Mödling-Vienna	20 June 1841
Graz-Celje	2 June 1846
Celje-Ljubljana	18 June 1849
Wiener Neustadt-Mürzzuschlag	23 October 1853
Ljubljana-Postojna	20 November 1856
Postojna-Trieste	27 July 1857

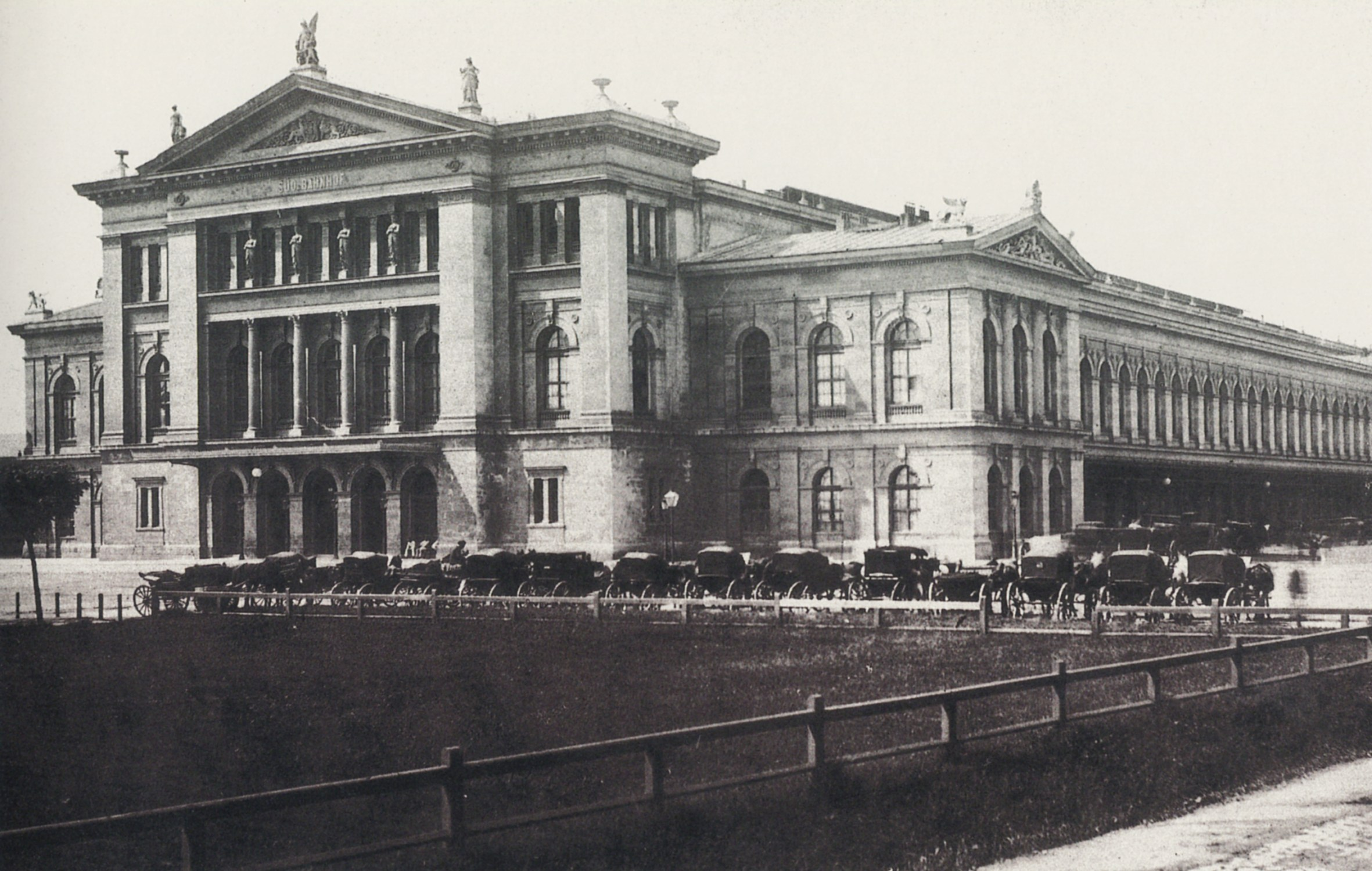
Wien Südbahnhof c. 1875

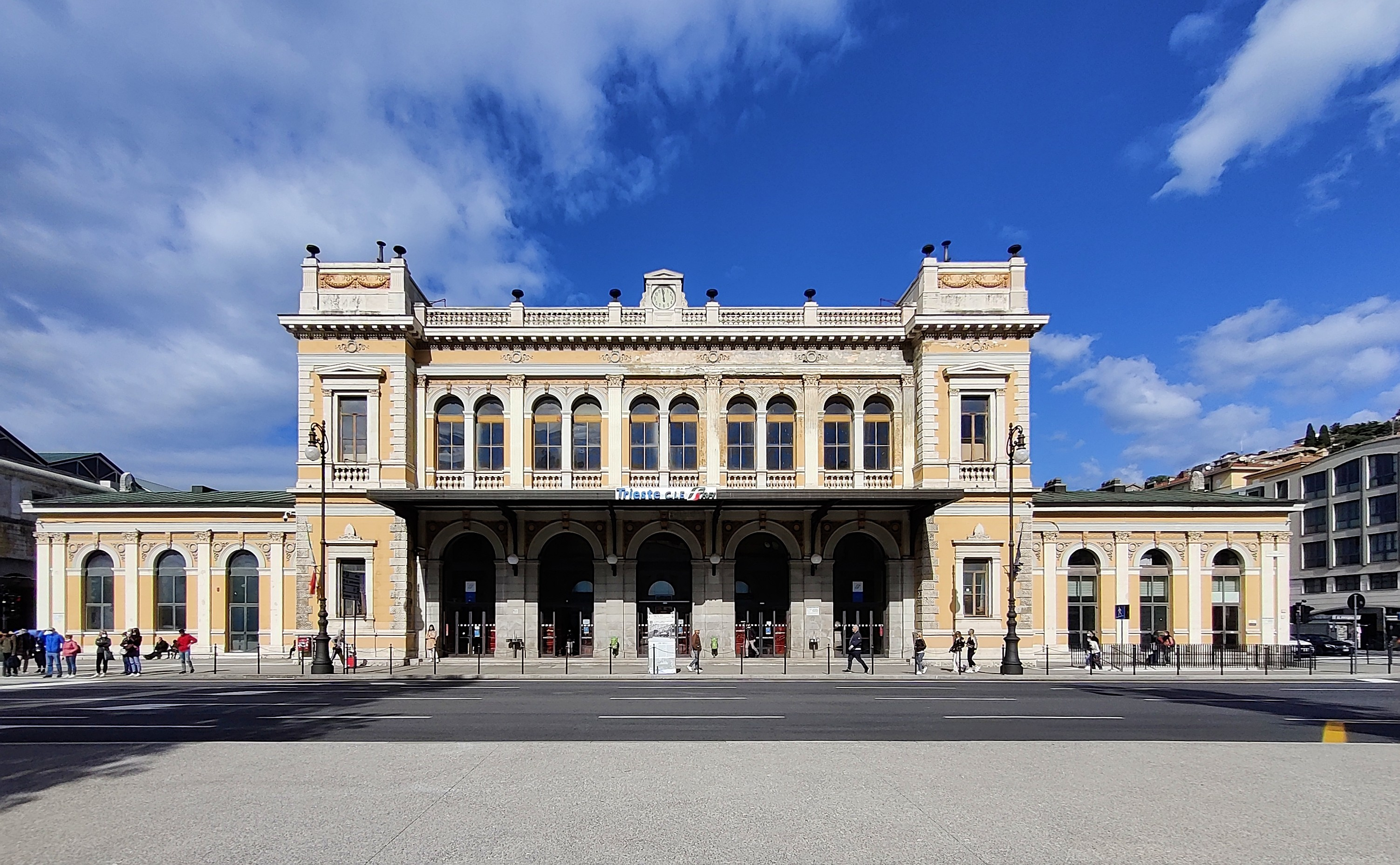
Trieste Centrale railway station, opened in 1857

- 1829: Austrian railway pioneer Franz Xaver Riepl proposed a railway connection from Vienna to the Adriatic Sea, bypassing the Eastern Alps and running via Bruck an der Leitha, Magyaróvár and Szombathely through the west edge of Hungary, and then via Maribor and Ljubljana to Trieste. His plans were adopted by entrepreneur Georgios Sinas. At the same time plans for a direct connection through the Alps were developed and promoted by Archduke John of Austria to open up the Styrian lands beyond Semmering Pass.
- 1839: Departing from the original plans of a connection via Hungary, construction works started on the initial section which ran southwards between Baden, Lower Austria and Wiener Neustadt.
- 1841: Carl Ritter von Ghega started to survey the terrain of the Semmering Pass.
- 5 May 1842: The line from Wien Südbahnhof (Southern Station) was completed to Gloggnitz at the northern foot of the Semmering Pass.
- 21 October 1844: South of the Semmering Pass, the line from Graz northward to Mürzzuschlag (decided on by the Austrian government)) opened; its construction was led by von Ghega.
- 2 June 1846: The southern continuation to Celje was inaugurated.
- 1849: The line was extended to Ljubljana.
- 1848 to 1854: The section over the Semmering Pass was built.
- 17 July 1854: The direct railway connection from Vienna to Ljubljana was inaugurated.
- 1854 to 1857: The final section across the Karst Plateau was built.
- 12 July 1857: The first through train from Vienna to Trieste ran.
- 23 May 1858: The railway was sold to the newly established Austrian Southern Railway Company.
- 1919: In the Treaty of Saint-Germain after World War I, Austria-Hungary was dissolved. Austria lost all of the Southern Railway south of the station at Spielfeld (Špilje), which became the new border station to the Kingdom of Serbs, Croats and Slovenes (Kingdom of Yugoslavia from 1929, present-day Slovenia).
- 1923: The Austrian Federal Railways took over the Austrian section.
- 1966: The tracks from Vienna to Graz and Slovenia were completely electrified.
- 2007: Border controls were abolished with Slovenia's accession to the Schengen Area.

=== Borovnica viaduct ===
The 561 m long and 38 m high Borovnica railway viaduct (also known as Franzdorfer viadukt in German) in Borovnica, Slovenia, was completed in 1856. The viaduct was badly damaged during World War II and demolished completely a few years after.

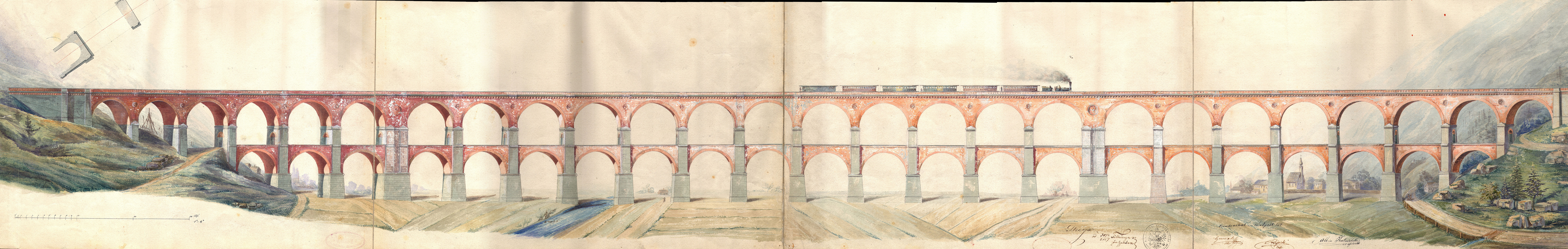

== Current ==
The section from Graz to the Slovenian border (near Šentilj v Slovenskih Goricah), which had been downgraded to a single track railway in the 1950s, is currently again rebuilt as a double track line. On the Slovenian section, work is in progress to upgrade and renovate Pragersko railway station as well as the line and railway crossings from Maribor to Celje. A new viaduct and tunnel are being built between Maribor and Pesnica. The old route will be turned into a bike path. The upgrades in Maribor railway station, Slovenska Bistrica railway station, Poljčane railway station and Celje railway station have already been completed.

== Management ==
Infrastructure and transport management on the line is now provided by three railway companies: Austrian Federal Railways (ÖBB) for the Austrian section, Slovenske železnice (SŽ) for the Slovenian one, and Italian railway infrastructure manager Rete Ferroviaria Italiana (RFI) for the Italian section.

== Sources ==
- Dietrich, Herbert. Die Südbahn und ihre Vorläufer. Wien, 1994. ISBN 3-7002-0871-5
- Mit Volldampf in den Süden : 150 Jahre Südbahn Wien-Triest. Wien, 2007
- Brate, Tadej. Die Geschichte der slowenischer Eisenbahnen auf Ansichtkarten, Celjska Mohorjeva družba, Celje. 2013. COBISS 265950720 , ISBN 978-961-278-064-7
