= Obervogau =

- Former municipality
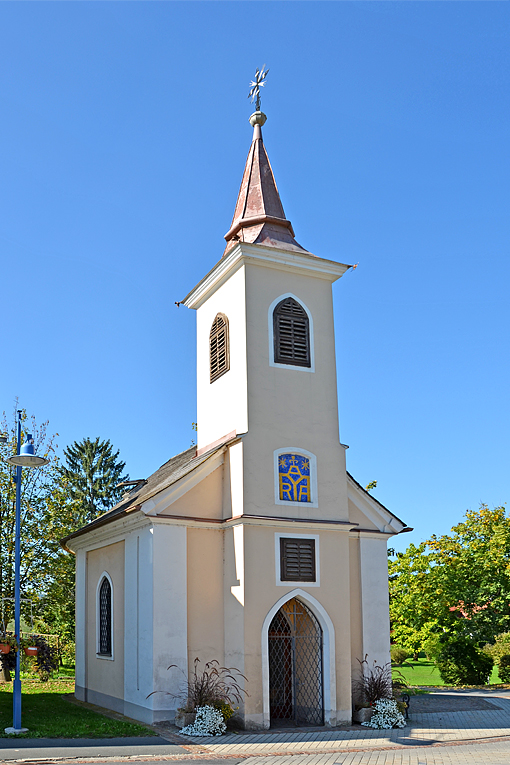
- Obervogau chapel

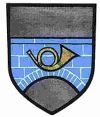
- Coat of arms

- Location within Austria
- Coordinates: 46°45′00″N 15°34′48″E
- Country: Austria
- State: Styria
- District: Leibnitz

Area
  - Total: 3.95 km^{2} (1.53 sq mi)
- Elevation: 260 m (850 ft)

Population (1 January 2016)
  - Total: 862
  - Density: 218/km^{2} (565/sq mi)
- Time zone: UTC+1 (CET)
  - Summer (DST): UTC+2 (CEST)
- Postal code: 8461, 8472
- Area code: 03453
- Vehicle registration: LB
- Website: www.obervogau.at

Obervogau is a former municipality in the district of Leibnitz in the Austrian state of Styria. Since the 2015 Styria municipal structural reform, it is part of the municipality Straß in Steiermark.

== Geography ==
Obervogau lies in a bend of the Mur river in southern Styria.
