= Vogau =

- Former municipality
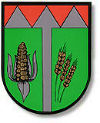
- Coat of arms

- Location within Austria
- Coordinates: 46°53′51″N 15°36′40″E
- Country: Austria
- State: Styria
- District: Leibnitz

Area
  - Total: 6.06 km^{2} (2.34 sq mi)
- Elevation: 260 m (850 ft)

Population (1 January 2016)
  - Total: 1,115
  - Density: 184/km^{2} (477/sq mi)
- Time zone: UTC+1 (CET)
  - Summer (DST): UTC+2 (CEST)
- Postal code: 8472
- Area code: 03453
- Vehicle registration: LB
- Website: www.vogau.at/

Vogau is a former municipality in the district of Leibnitz in the Austrian state of Styria. Since the 2015 Styria municipal structural reform, it is part of the municipality Straß in Steiermark.

== Population ==
Historical population
Year	Pop.	±%
1869	556	—
1880	560	+0.7%
1890	634	+13.2%
1900	626	−1.3%
1910	626	+0.0%
1923	618	−1.3%
1934	719	+16.3%
1939	707	−1.7%
1951	796	+12.6%
1961	795	−0.1%
1971	877	+10.3%
1981	862	−1.7%
1991	949	+10.1%
2001	1,057	+11.4%
2013	1,093	+3.4%
