= SŽ series 342 =

SŽ 342 FNM E.640
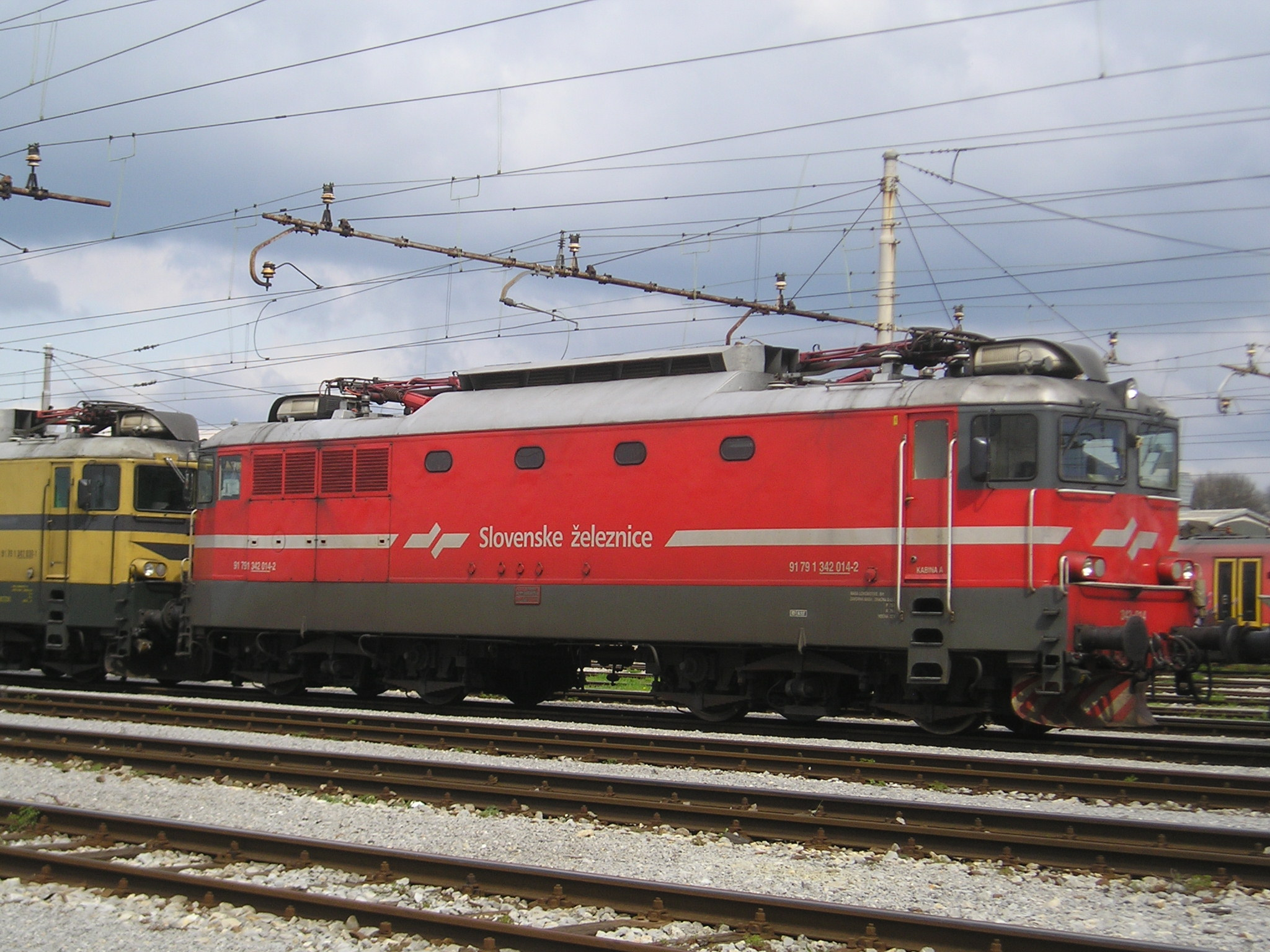
Type and origin
- Power type: Electric
- Builder: Ansaldo (later part of the ASGEN consortium)
- Build date: 1968-1970
- Total produced: 40
Specifications
- Configuration
  - UIC: Bo'Bo'
- Wheel diameter: 1250 mm
- Minimum curve: 80 m
- Length
  - Over body: 15.8m
- Width: 3.15 m
- Height
  - Pantograph: 4.28m
- Axle load: 20.3 t
- Loco weight: 81 t
- Electric system/s: 3 kV DC
Performance figures
- Maximum speed: 120 km/h
- Power output: 1980 kW
Career
- Operators: Slovenian Railways
- Nicknames: moped, tsar

SŽ 342 is a series of single-system four-axle electric locomotives that make up the rolling stock of Slovenian Railways. Since it has "only" four axles compared to its six-axle contemporaries, the railwaymen somewhat mockingly called it a moped. As the locomotive proved to be one of the most reliable, the nickname "Tsar" became established for it.

In the years 1968-1970, 40 locomotives were delivered from Italy to haul passenger and light freight trains.

== Disposition ==
Their service life is coming to an end and the fleet has roughly halved by now. In recent years, some locomotives were sold to the Italian regional railways Ferrovie Emilia-Romagna (FER) and Ferrovie Nord Milano (FNM), where they were renumbered to the E.640 series. Some of them have already been scrapped, and the rest will most likely be withdrawn from traffic in a few years.

Ferrovie Emilia Romagna (FER) E.640s.

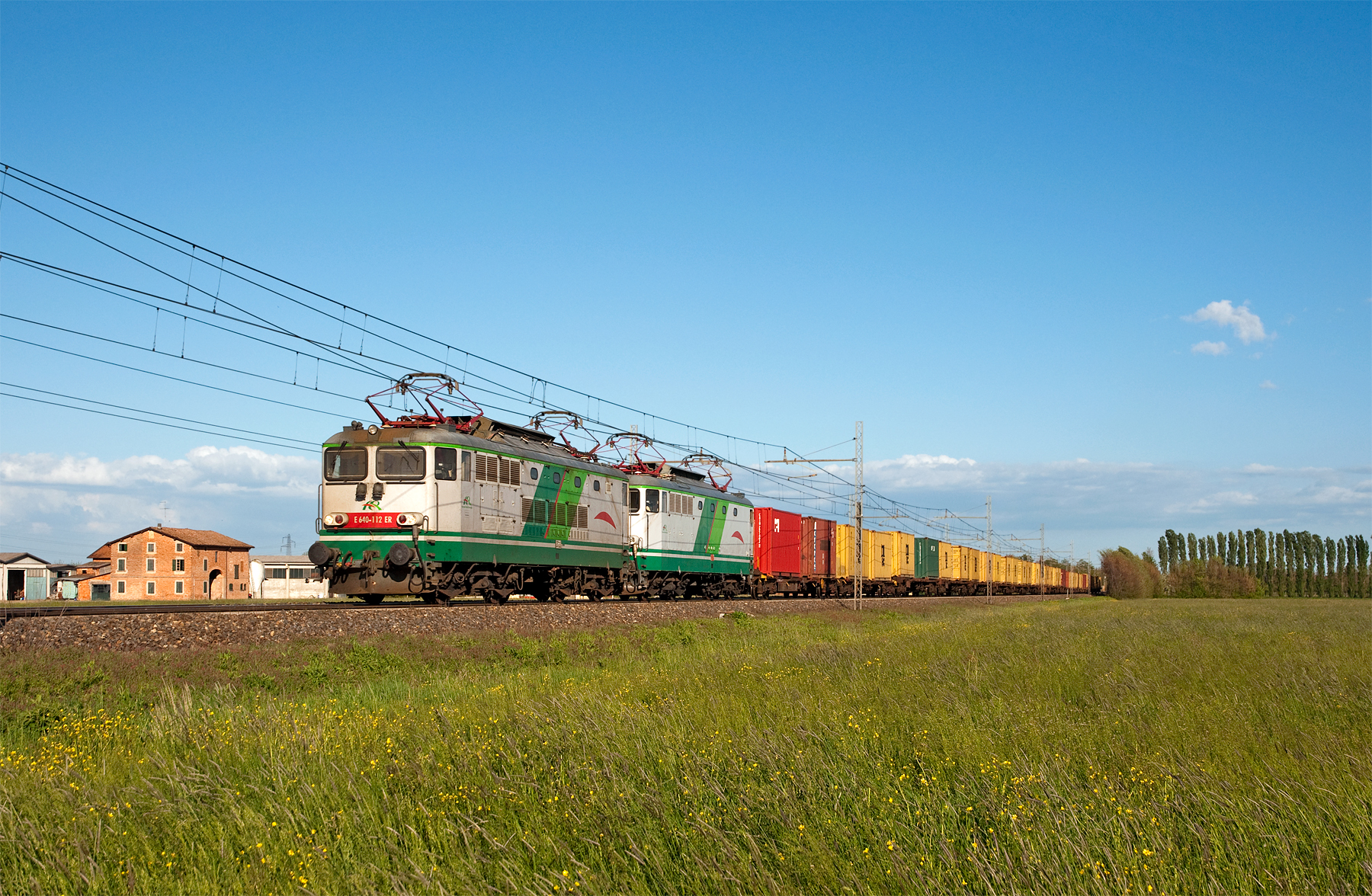

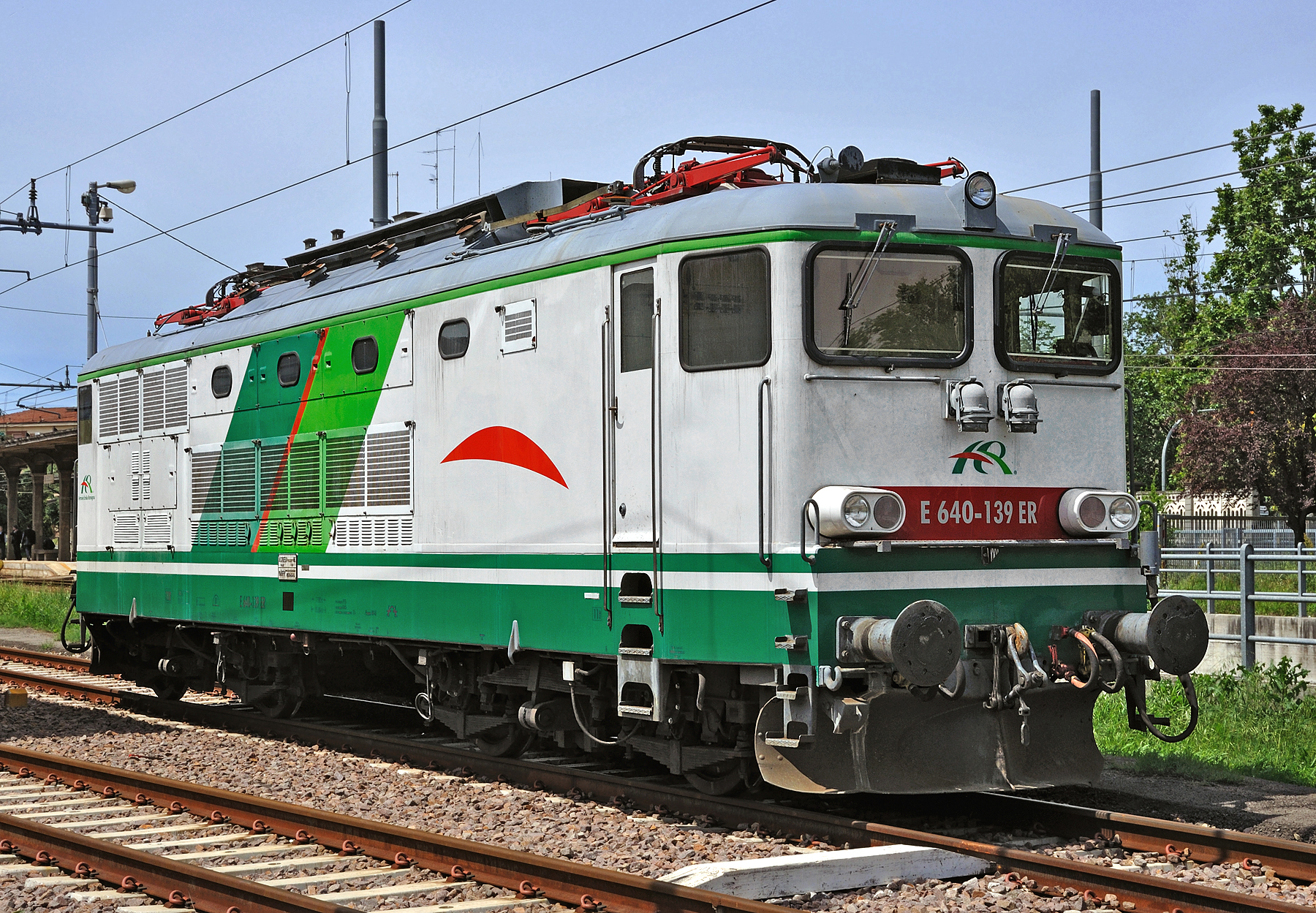

== Drive ==
The locomotive contains four electric motors (each motor on its own axis), which can be connected in parallel or in series, depending on the traction regime. Transmission on the driven axle is via a gear ratio of 25:76.

== See also ==
- SŽ series 342 discussion thread
- SŽ series 342 commons gallery
- Ferrovie dello Stato Italiane electric locomotives
