= Straß in Steiermark =

- Municipality
- Coat of arms

- Location within Austria
- Coordinates: 46°43′38″N 15°37′28″E
- Country: Austria
- State: Styria
- District: Leibnitz

Government
  - Mayor: Johann Lappi (ÖVP)

Area
  - Total: 28.85 km^{2} (11.14 sq mi)
- Elevation: 254 m (833 ft)

Population (2018-01-01)
  - Total: 4,852
  - Density: 168.2/km^{2} (435.6/sq mi)
- Time zone: UTC+1 (CET)
  - Summer (DST): UTC+2 (CEST)
- Postal code: 8461, 8471, 8472, 8473
- Area code: +43 3453, +43 3472
- Vehicle registration: LB
- Website: www.strass.steiermark.gv.at

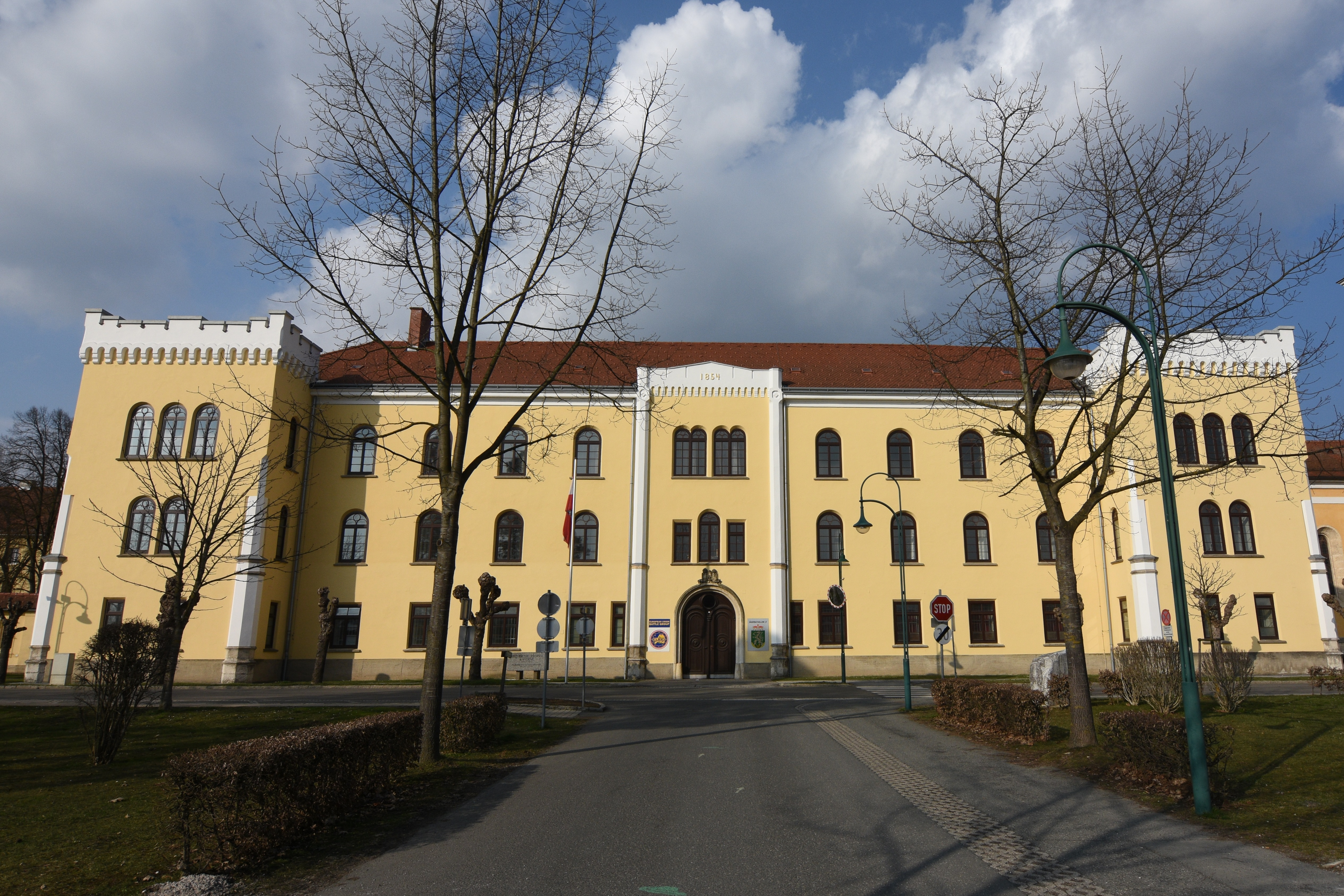
Castle Straß

Straß in Steiermark is a municipality in the district of Leibnitz in the Austrian state of Styria.

== Geography ==
Straß in Steiermark is situated in the south of Styria, on the border with Slovenia.

=== Constituent parts of Straß municipality ===
The municipality comprises the communities of:

- Gersdorf an der Mur (393)
- Grassnitzberg (177)
- Lichendorf (506)
- Obegg (37)
- Oberschwarza (156)
- Obervogau (893)
- Spielfeld (683)
- Straß in Steiermark (1571)
- Unterschwarza (214)
- Vogau (1164)
- Weitersfeld an der Mur (555)

== Population ==
Historical population

Year	Pop.	±%
1869	4,820	—
1880	4,936	+2.4%
1890	5,031	+1.9%
1900	5,064	+0.7%
1910	5,237	+3.4%
1923	5,622	+7.4%

Year	Pop.	±%
1934	5,924	+5.4%
1939	5,276	−10.9%
1951	5,724	+8.5%
1961	5,471	−4.4%
1971	5,762	+5.3%
1981	5,550	−3.7%

Year	Pop.	±%
1991	5,681	+2.4%
2001	6,090	+7.2%
2011	6,106	+0.3%
2020	6,349	+4.0%
