= Maribor railway station =

Railway station in Maribor, Slovenia

- Maribor railway station in 2019

General information
- Location: Partizanska cesta 50; 2000 Maribor, Slovenia; Slovenia
- Coordinates: 46°33′42″N 15°39′27″E
- Owner: Slovenske železnice
- Operator: Slovenske železnice
- Platforms: 3
- Connections: Local and Long distance buses

History
- Opened: 1844
- Rebuilt: 2021
Location
- Location within Slovenia

Maribor railway station (Slovene: Železniška postaja Maribor) is the main railway station in Maribor, the second largest city in Slovenia. It was erected in 1844. It was upgraded in 2021.

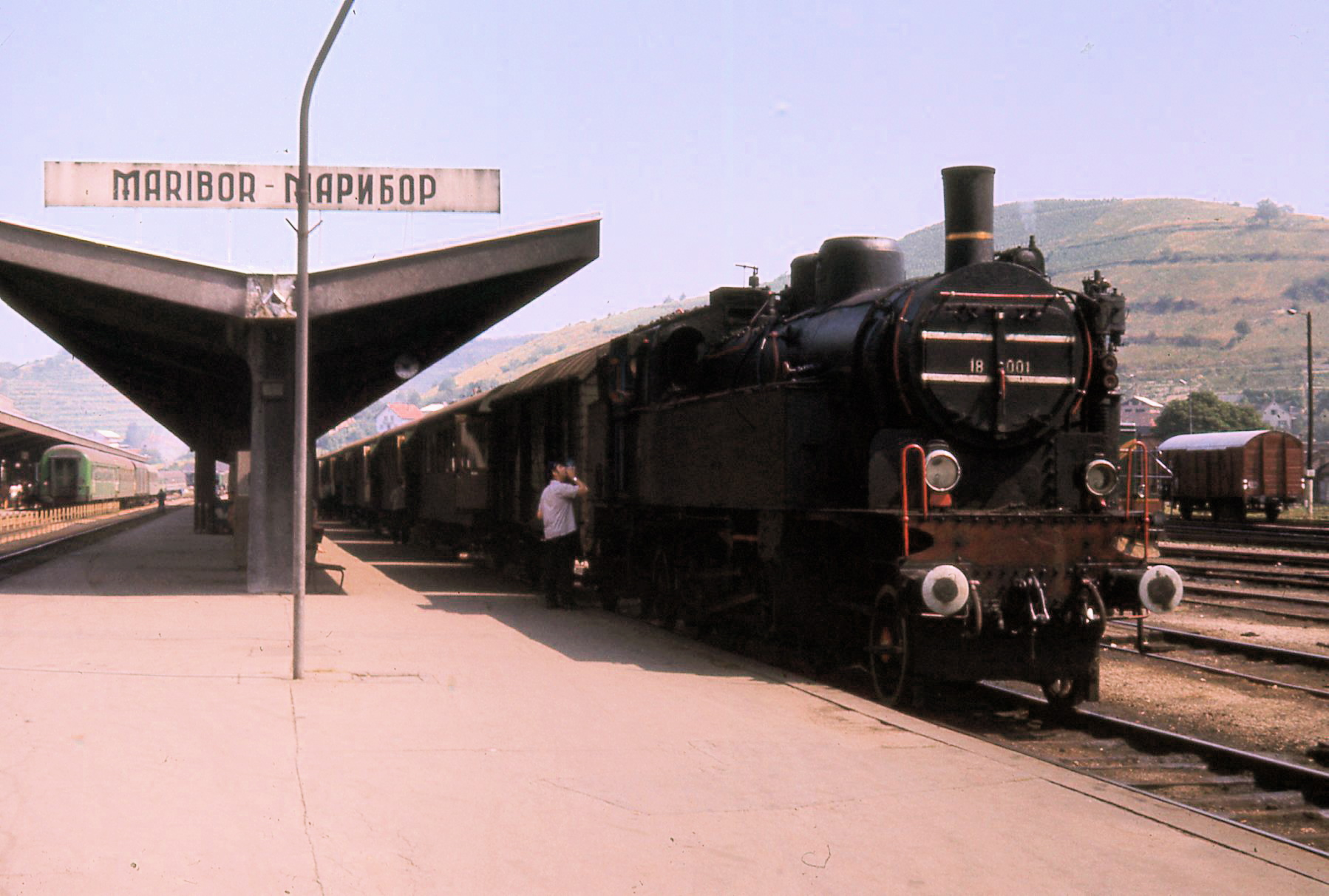
Yugoslav Railways (JŽ) Class 18 4-6-2T at Maribor with a train for the Bleiburg line, August 1971
