= Trieste Centrale railway station =

Railway station in Trieste, Italy

Trieste Centrale
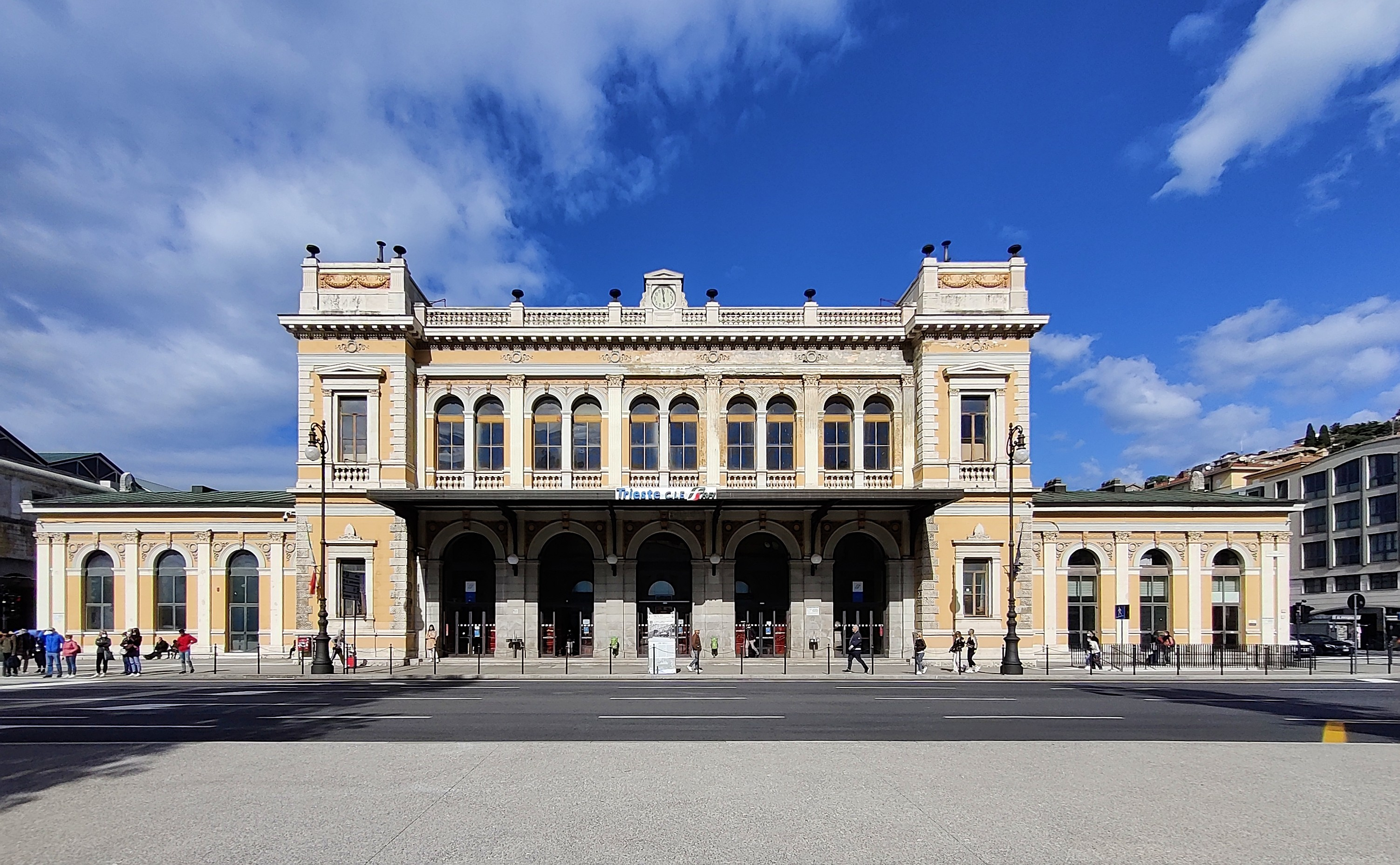
- The main entrance

General information
- Location: Piazza della Libertà; 34132 Trieste TS; Trieste, Trieste, Friuli-Venezia Giulia; Italy
- Coordinates: 45.657470°N 13.772105°E
- Operator: Rete Ferroviaria Italiana; Centostazioni
- Lines: Venice–Trieste; Udine–Trieste; Vienna–Trieste
- Train operators: Trenitalia
- Connections: Trieste Trasporti, suburban and international buses; Ferries to Durrës

Other information
- IATA code: TXB
- Classification: Gold

History
- Opened: 27 July 1857; 169 years ago
Location
- Location within Friuli-Venezia Giulia Location within Northern Italy Location within Italy

Trieste Centrale railway station (IATA: TXB) (Italian: Stazione ferroviaria di Trieste Centrale; formerly German: Triest Südbahnhof) is the main station serving the city and municipality (comune) of Trieste, in the autonomous region of Friuli-Venezia Giulia, northeastern Italy.

Opened in 1857, the station is a terminus for direct lines to Venice, Udine and Vienna, and for the belt line leading to Trieste's marshalling yard, near the now closed Trieste Campo Marzio railway station.

Trieste Centrale is currently managed by Rete Ferroviaria Italiana (RFI). However, the commercial area of the passenger building is managed by Centostazioni. Train services towards Italy from the station are operated by Trenitalia, a subsidiary of Ferrovie dello Stato Italiane (FS), Italy's state-owned rail company and Italian private company Nuovo Trasporto Viaggiatori. A daily international connection is operated by ÖBB towards Wien via Ljubljana.

== Location ==
Trieste Centrale railway station is situated at Piazza della Libertà, north of the city centre. It is at the western end of the Borgo Teresiano district, adjacent to the old free port of Trieste.

== History ==
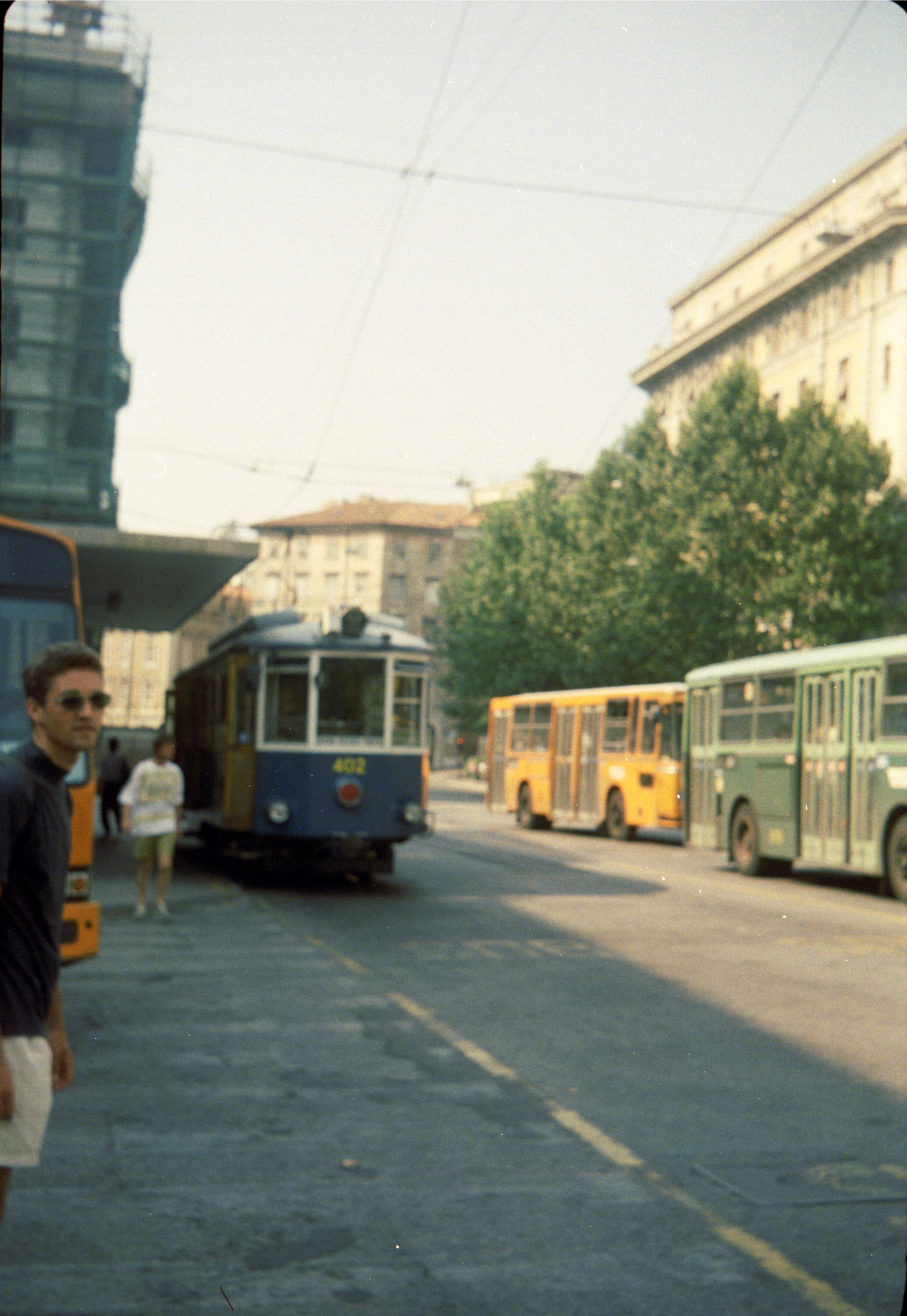
A tram at the Piazza Oberdan terminus for the interurban line to Villa Opicina

The present day rail network of the city of Trieste is based, for the most part, upon railway lines constructed by the former Austrian and Austro-Hungarian empires. On 27 July 1857, the Austrian railway company k.k. Südliche Staatsbahn (SStB) completed the construction of Trieste's first railway facilities. They formed part of the Vienna–Trieste railway, via the Semmering pass.

On the same day, in the presence of the Austrian Emperor Franz Joseph I, the new terminal station at Trieste, including its relatively modest original passenger building designed by the engineer Carl Ritter von Ghega (Italian: Carlo Ghega), was officially opened. It had been built on reclaimed land, at the site of the present Trieste Centrale.

The following year, on 23 September 1858, the station, along with the rest of the line, passed into the ownership of the private railway company Imperial Royal Privileged Southern Railway Company of Austria, Venice and central Italy (German: Kaiserlich königliche privilegierte Südbahngesellschaft), following the takeover by that company of the privatised k.k. Südliche Staatsbahn.

The inclusion of Trieste in the main axis of the Austrian Südbahn generated an economic upswing in the largest and most important port city ruled by the Austrian monarchy, and strengthened its position in the Habsburg Empire. Rapid development of trade routes to and from Trieste, and therefore also the city itself, soon led to a decision to replace the original passenger building. The new, more elegant, and richly styled Neo-Renaissance structure was designed by Wilhelm von Flattich. Its most notable features were a monumental hall, later known as the Royal Hall, and a majestic glass train hall. Its inauguration took place on 19 June 1878.

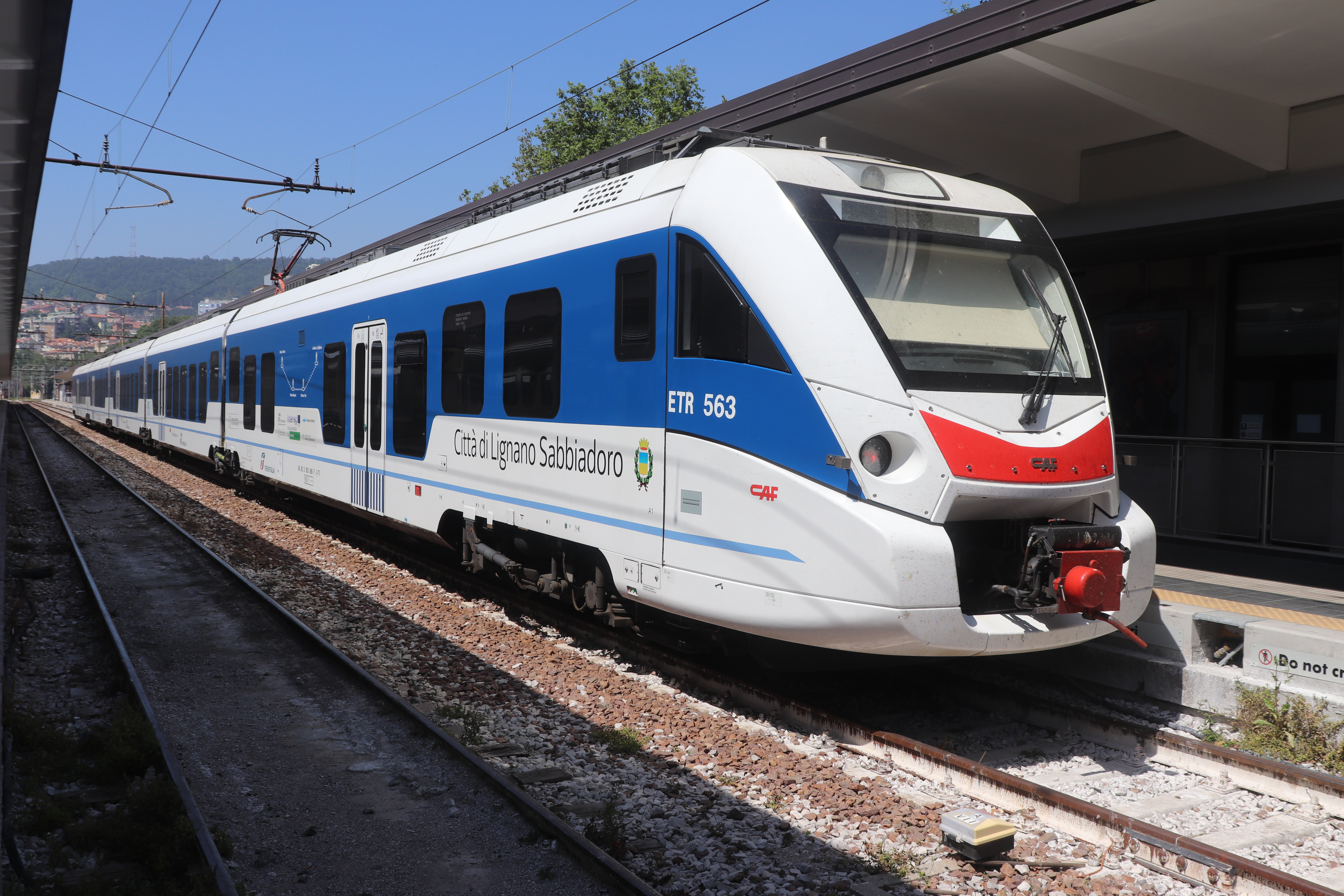
An ETR 563 at Trieste Centrale

In 1887, the Imperial Royal Austrian State Railways (German: kaiserlich-königliche österreichische Staatsbahnen) opened a new railway line, the Trieste–Hrpelje railway (German: Hrpelje-Bahn), from the new port of Trieste to Hrpelje-Kozina, on the Istrian railway. The intended function of the new line was to reduce the Austrian Empire's dependence on the Südbahn network. Its opening gave Trieste a second station, which was named Trieste Sant'Andrea (German: Triest Sankt Andrea). The two stations were connected by a railway line that in the initial plans had to be an interim solution: the Rive railway (German: Rive-Bahn).

With the opening of the Jesenice-Trieste railway (part of the network of railway lines known as the Transalpine Railway) in 1906, the St Andrea station was replaced by a new, more capacious, facility, named Trieste stazione dello Stato (German: Triest Staatsbahnhof). The original station came to be identified as Trieste stazione della Meridionale or Trieste Meridionale (German: Triest Südbahnhof).

Following World War I and the Treaty of Saint-Germain-en-Laye (1919), both stations came under the management of the FS. The original station was later renamed Trieste Centrale, and Trieste stazione dello Stato became Trieste Campo Marzio.

With the addition of the station to the Centostazioni project, it became possible to subject the passenger building to a long restoration and renovation. The work was completed in 2007, and included the full restoration of access from Via Miramare to the Royal Hall.

== Features ==
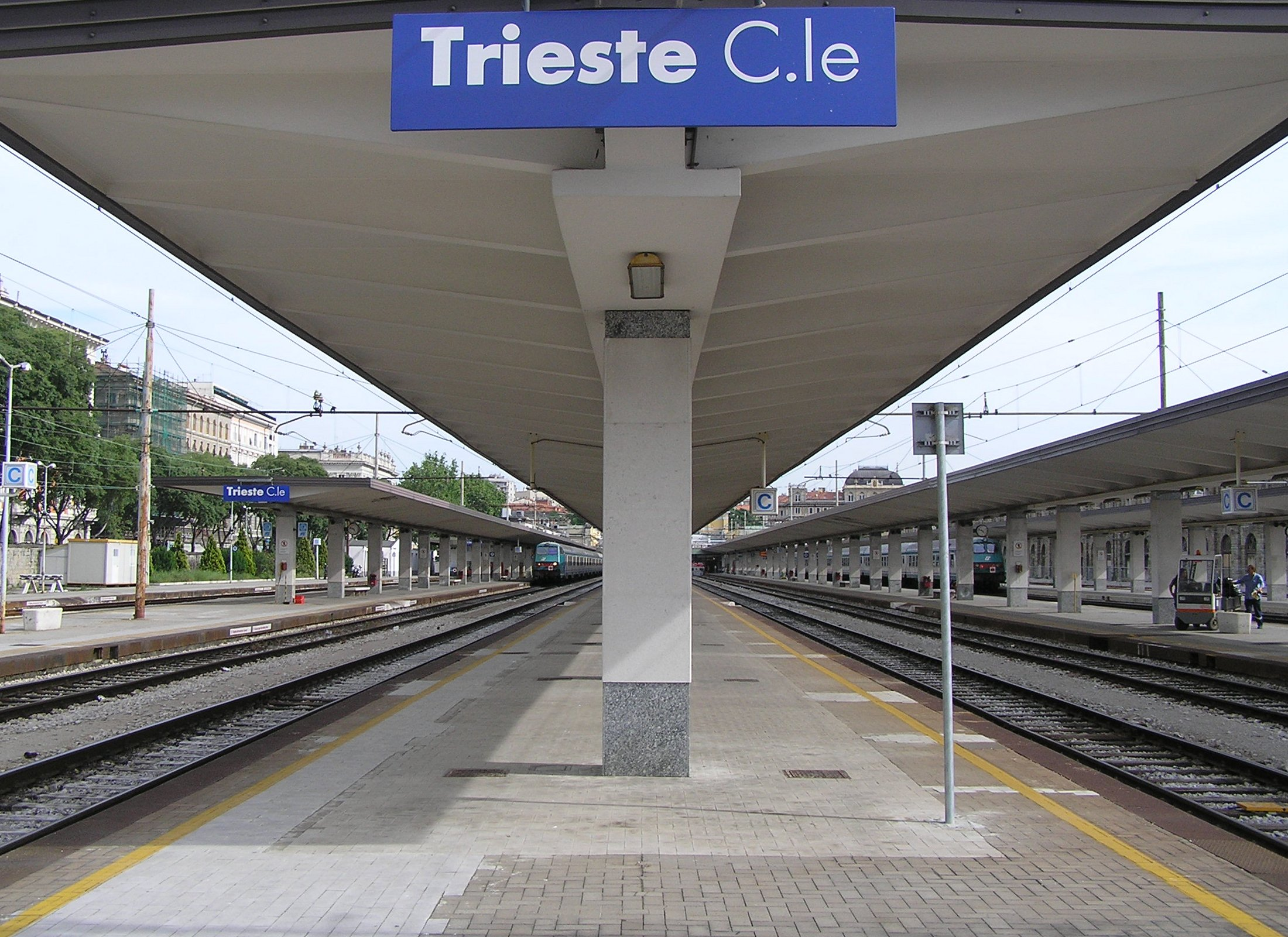
View of the station yard.

The renovated station (by Centostazioni in 2007) houses a large passenger building with facilities including a ticket office, central waiting area, chapel, bar, supermarket, bookshop, pharmacy and a new lounge dedicated to high-speed train passengers (Freccia Club, formerly Eurostar Italia). There are offices for the railway police, Trenitalia and its operations management.

As a terminal station, Trieste Centrale has nine terminating tracks used for passenger service, which is served by five platforms. In 2009, a terminal was opened for the transport of cars. There are also track sidings, a locomotive shed and workshops. Due to its close proximity to the port of Trieste, the station has no goods yard.

The urban bus stops are directly located in front of the station's main entrance. The Autostazione bus station is located to the south and there are long-distance services to Slovenia, Austria and the Balkan Peninsula.

== Train services ==
The station has about six million passenger movements each year. It is served by trains linking it with all of Italy.

The station is served by the following services:

- High speed services (Frecciargento) Rome – Florence – Bologna – Padua – Venice – Trieste
- High speed services (Frecciarossa) Turin – Milan – Verona – Padua – Venice – Trieste
- Intercity services Rome – Florence – Bologna – Padua – Venice – Trieste
- Night train (Intercity Notte) Rome – Bologna – Venice – Udine – Trieste
- Express services (Regionale Veloce) Venice – Portogruaro – Cervignano del Friuli – Trieste
- Express services (Regionale Veloce) Venice – Treviso – Udine – Gorizia – Trieste
- Regional services (Treno regionale) Venice – Treviso – Udine – Gorizia – Trieste
- Regional services (Treno regionale) Tarvisio – Carnia – Gemona del Friuli – Udine – Cervignano del Friuli – Trieste
- Regional services (Treno regionale) Ljubljana – Sežana – Trieste
- Eurocity Vienna – Ljubljana – Trieste
- Railjet Vienna - Graz - Klagenfurt - Villach - Udine - Trieste

== Images ==
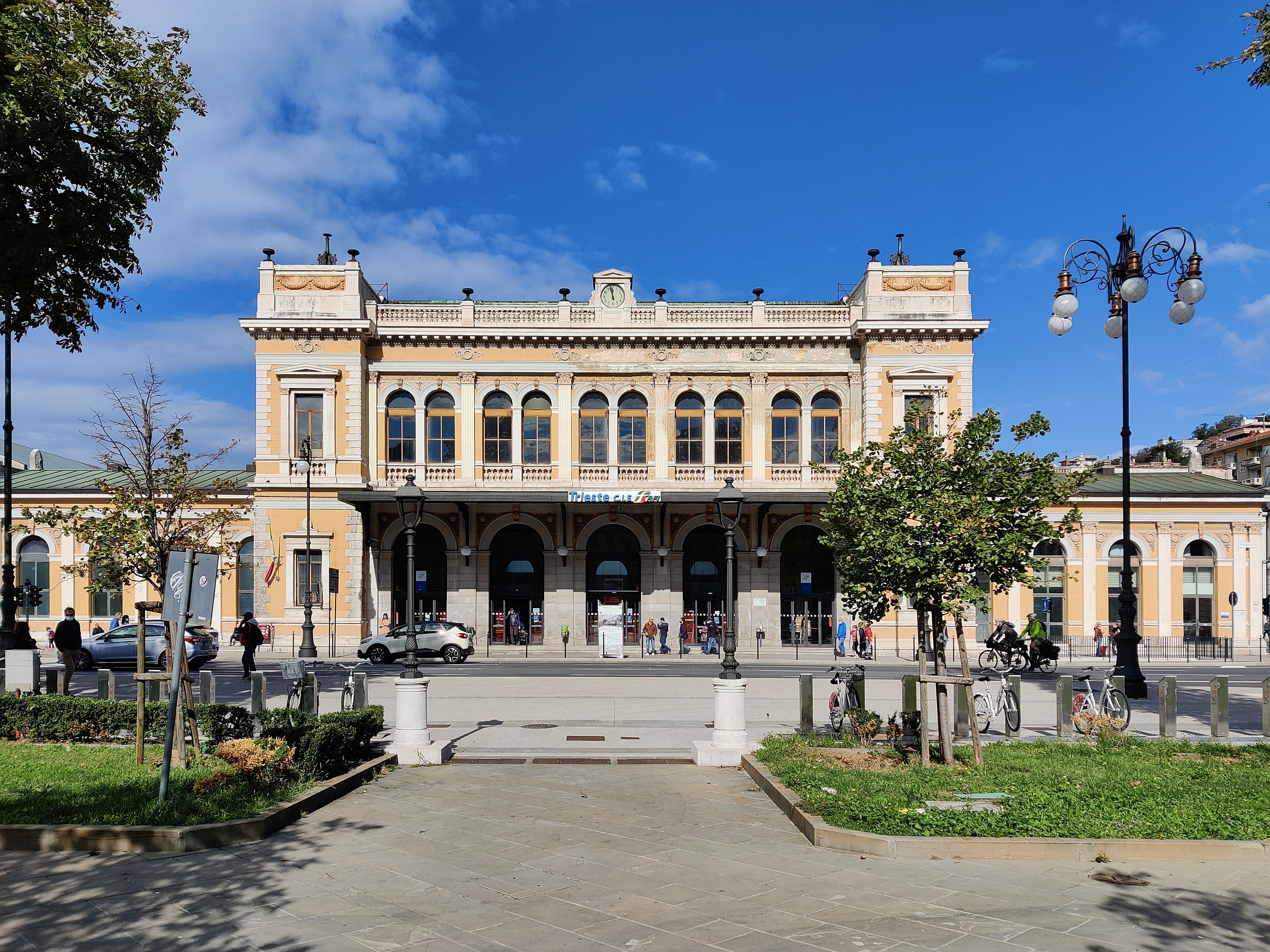
The entry to Trieste Centrale

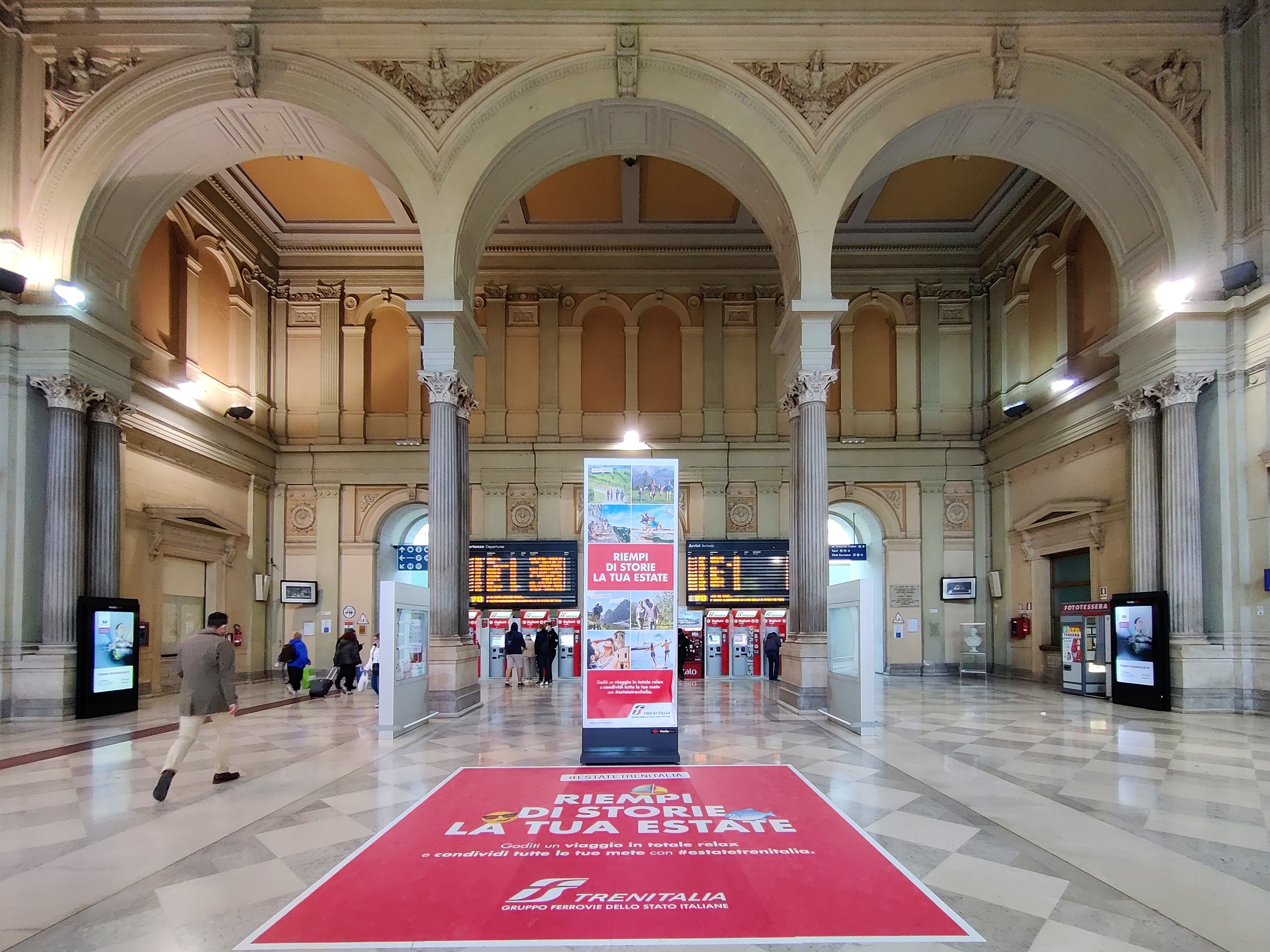
Inside Trieste Centrale.

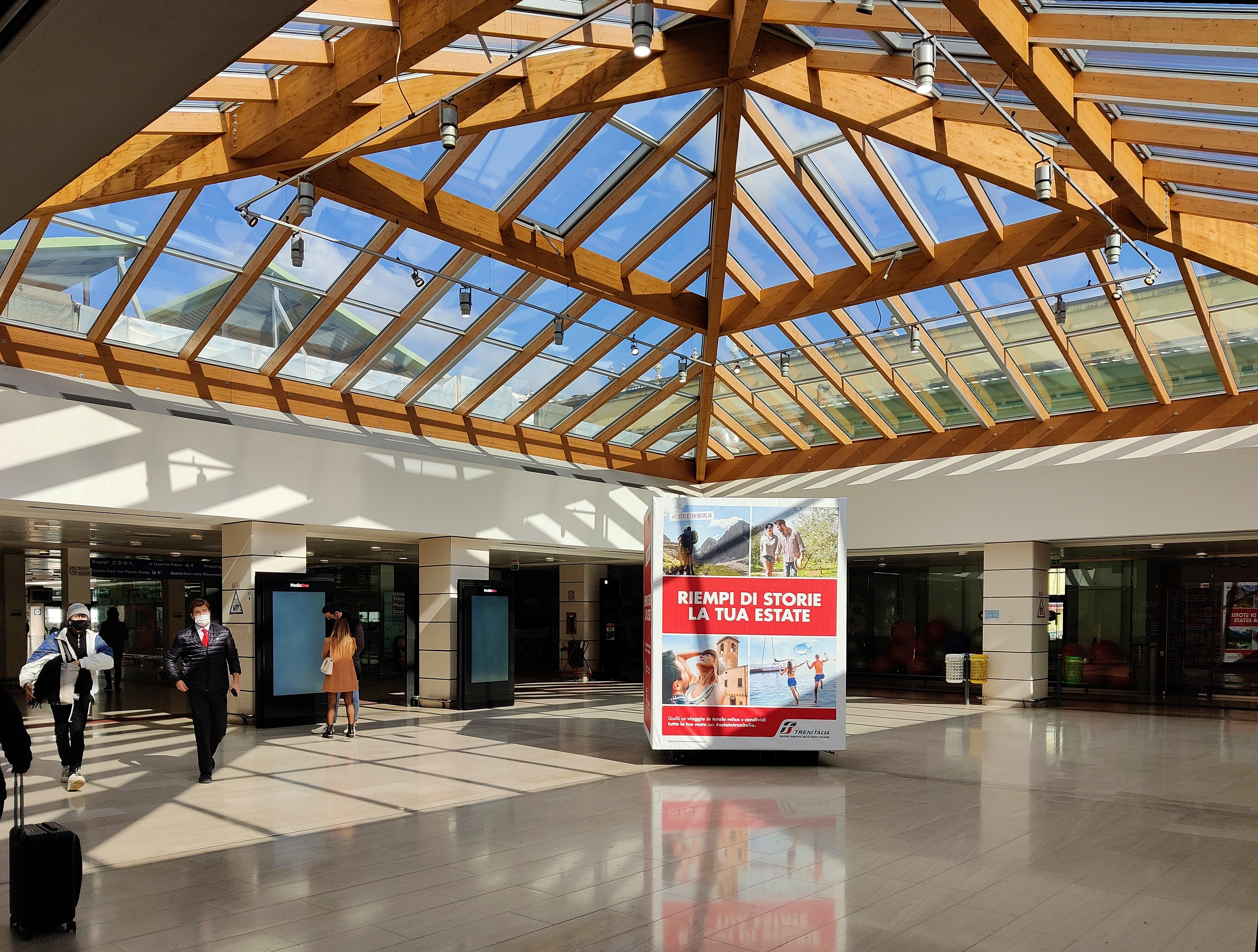
Looking up inside Trieste Centrale.

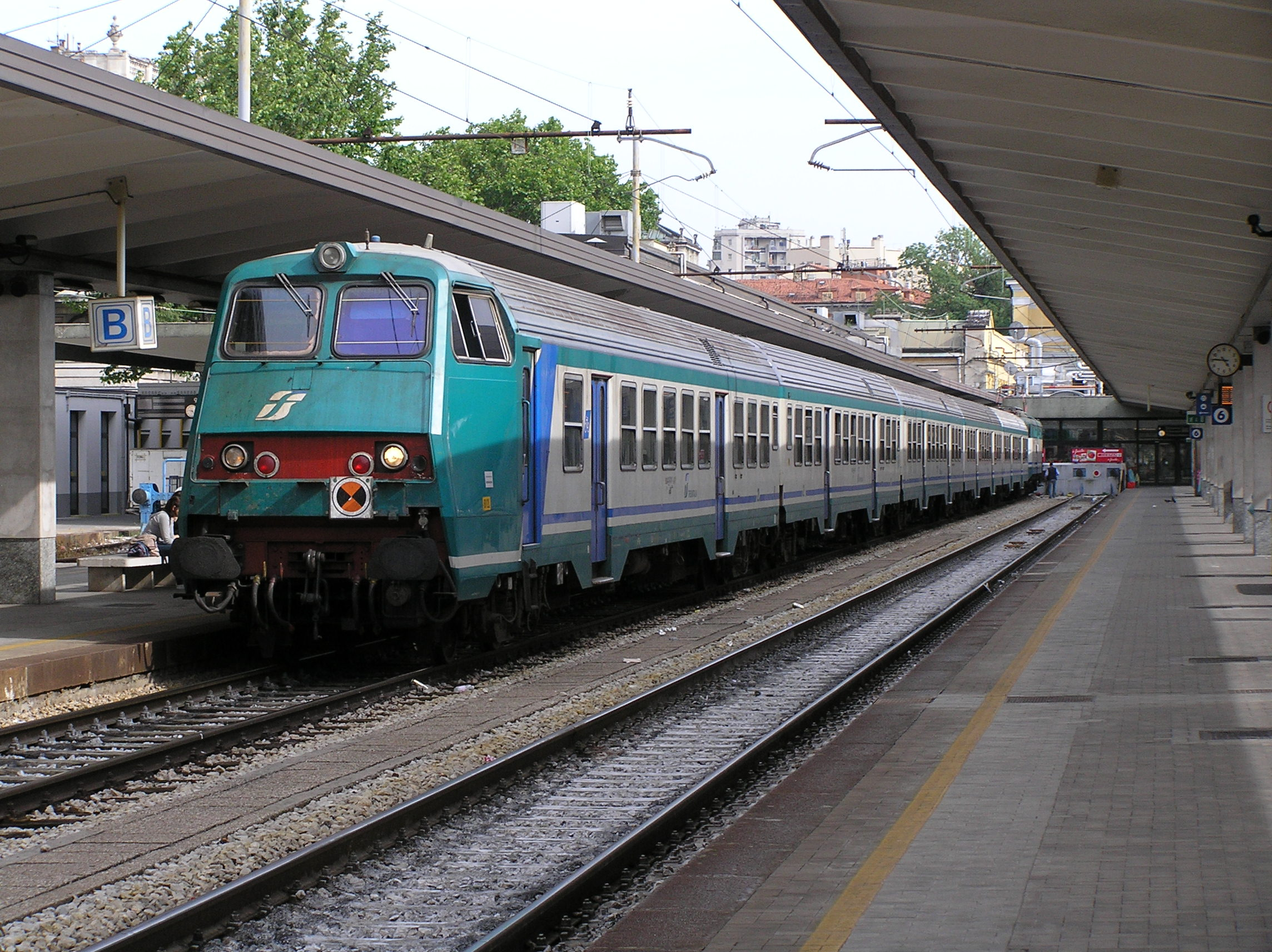
An FS push-pull train at Trieste Centrale.

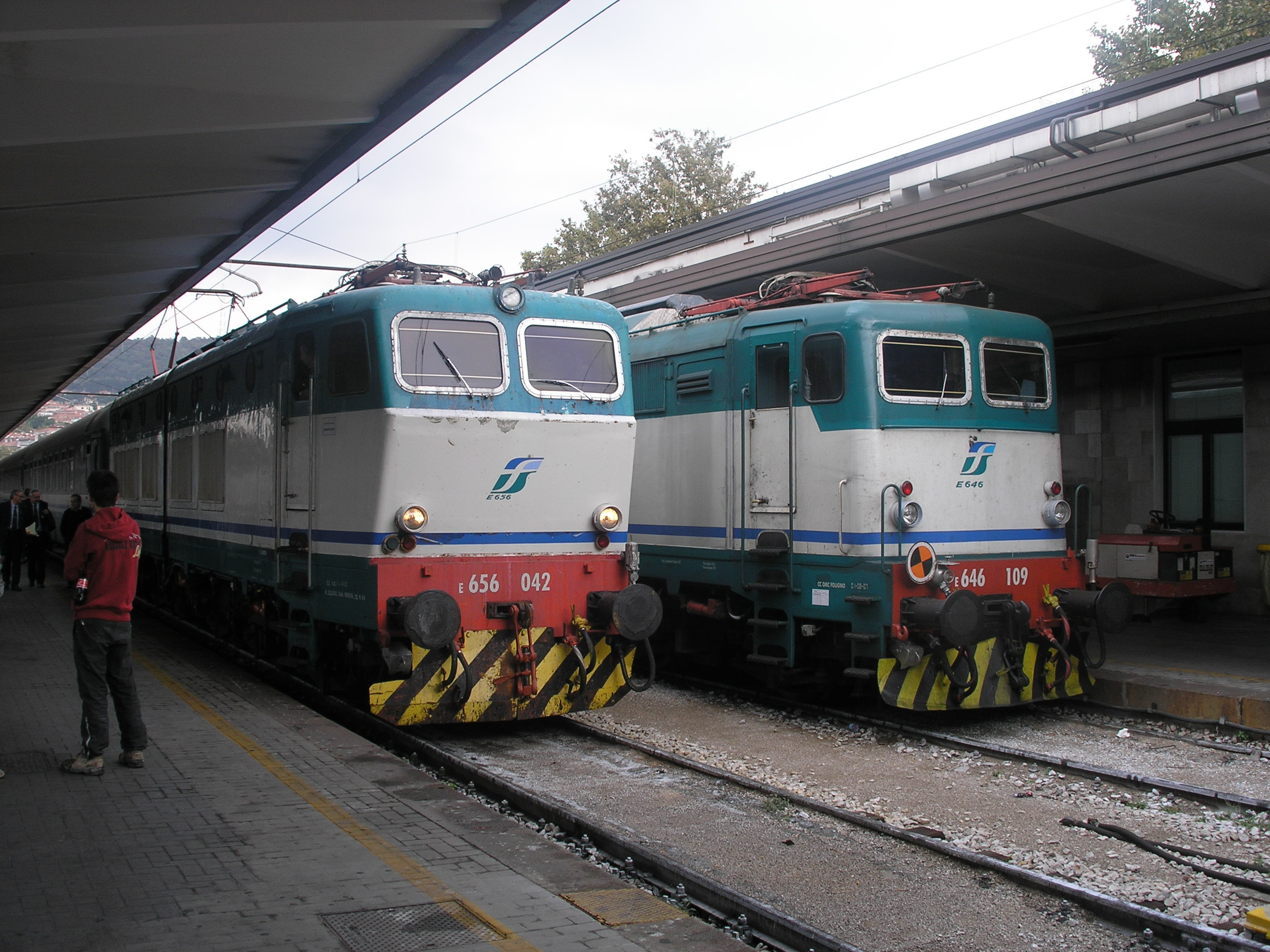
FS Class E.656 and FS Class E.646 at Trieste Centrale.

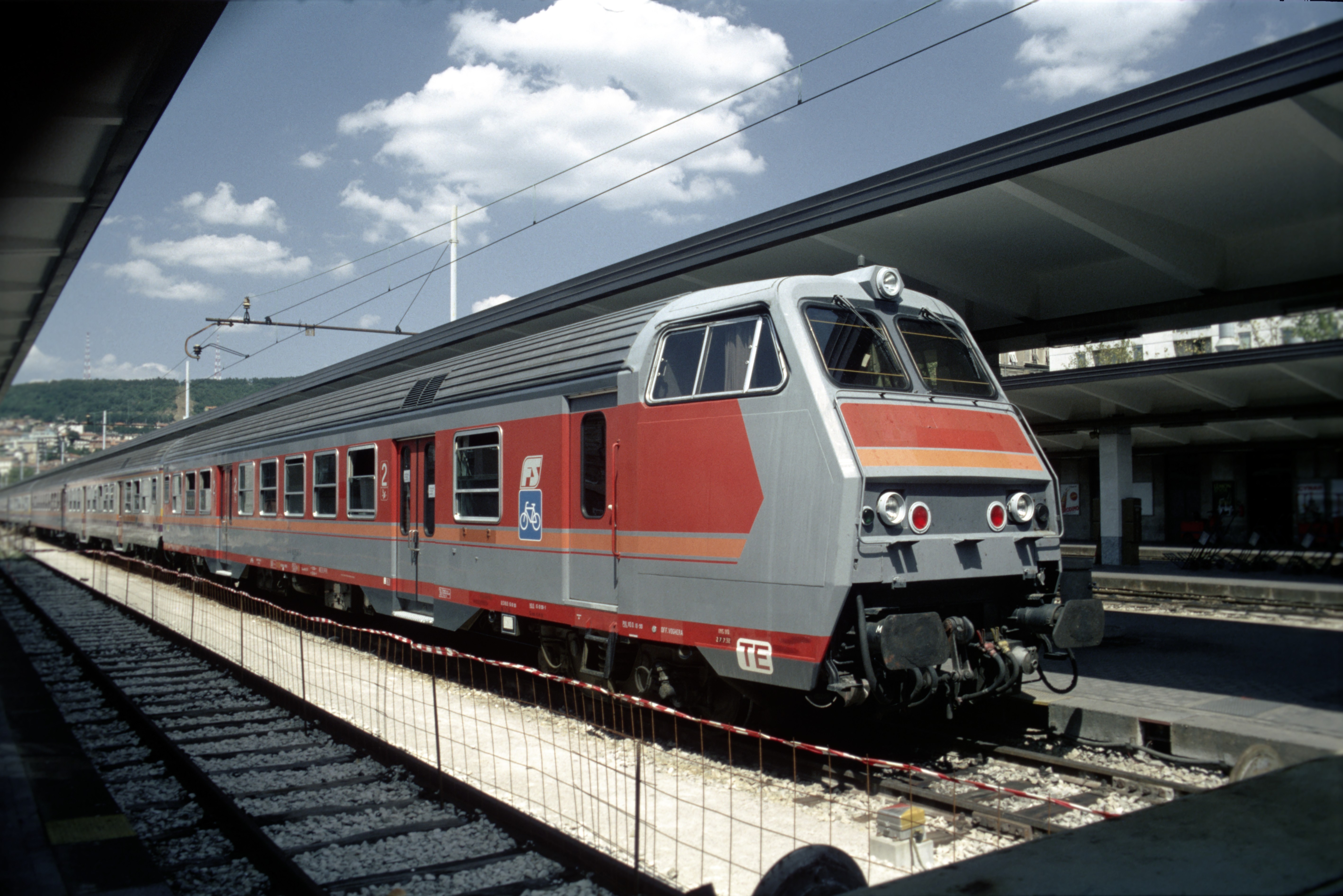
Push pull train at Trieste Centrale.

== See also ==
- History of rail transport in Italy
- List of railway stations in Friuli-Venezia Giulia
- Rail transport in Italy
- Railway stations in Italy
