= Gornja Radgona railway station =

Railway station in Municipality of Gornja Radgona, Slovenia

Gornja Radgona
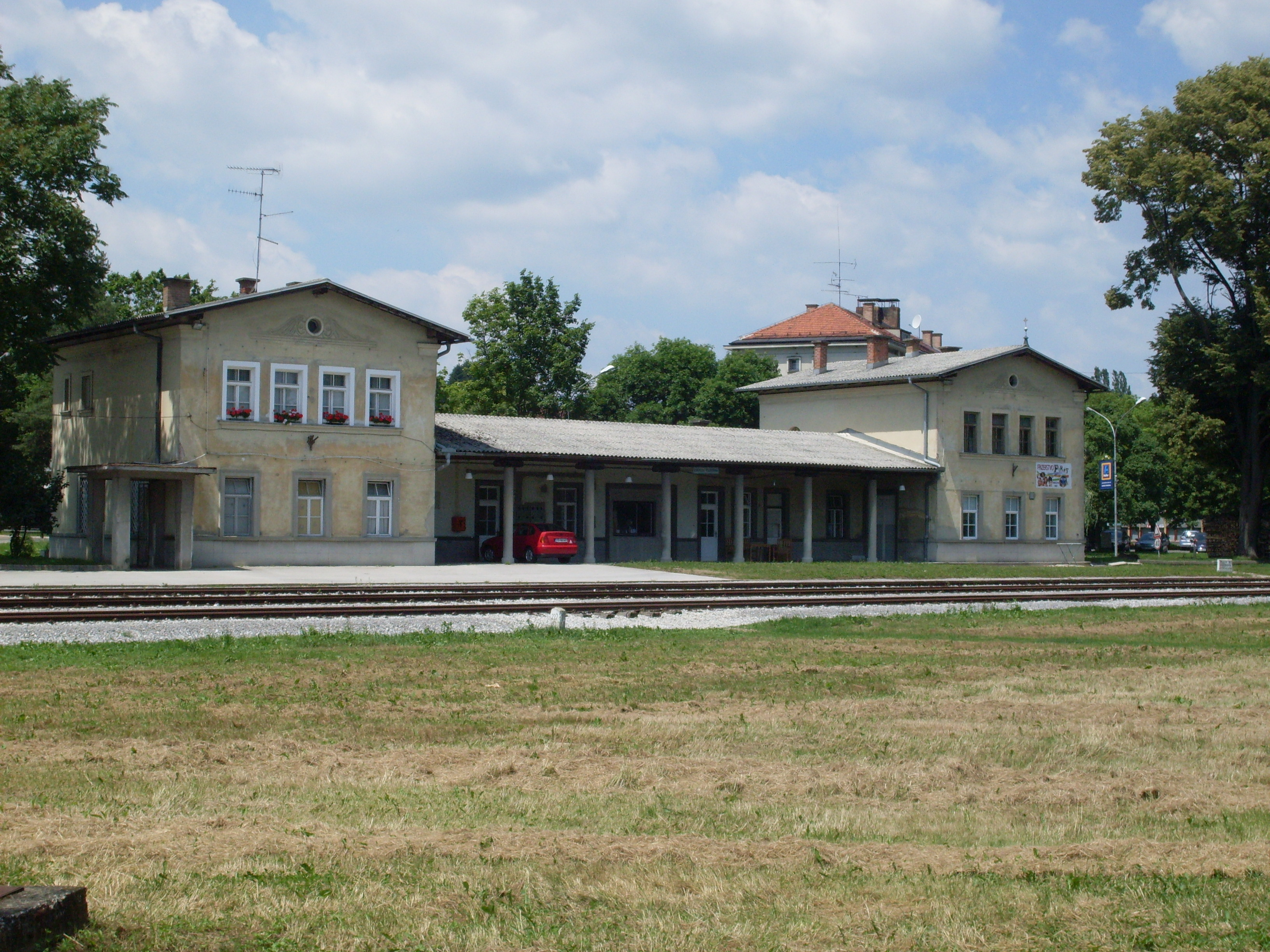

General information
- Location: Panonska ulica 8; 9250 Gornja Radgona; Slovenia
- Coordinates: 46°40′38″N 15°59′32″E
- Owner: Slovenske železnice
- Operator: Slovenske železnice

History
- Opened: 16 October 1890
Location
- Location within Slovenia

Gornja Radgona railway station (Slovene: Železniška postaja Gornja Radgona; German: Bahnhof Oberradkersburg) serves the municipality of Gornja Radgona, Slovenia. It was opened on 16 October 1890, as part of the extension of the Radkersburger Bahn from Bad Radkersburg, in present-day Austria, to Ljutomer (then known as Luttenberg), in present-day Slovenia.

At the end of World War II, the Radkersburger Bahn was cut at the border between Austria and the then Yugoslavia. Since then, Gornja Radgona station has been the terminus of what had become a branch line from Ljutomer.

Today, the Ljutomer–Gornja Radgona line is normally used solely for freight traffic. Passengers are carried only during Gornja Radgona's agricultural food fair, when special trains are operated.
