= JŽ series 713 =

JŽ series 713 may refer to:

- FS Class ALn 772, designated JŽ 713 in Yugoslavia after the Second World War
- SŽ series 713/715, designated JŽ 713/715 until the breakup of Yugoslavia
