= Ajdovščina railway station =

Railway station in Ajdovščina, Slovenia

Ajdovščina
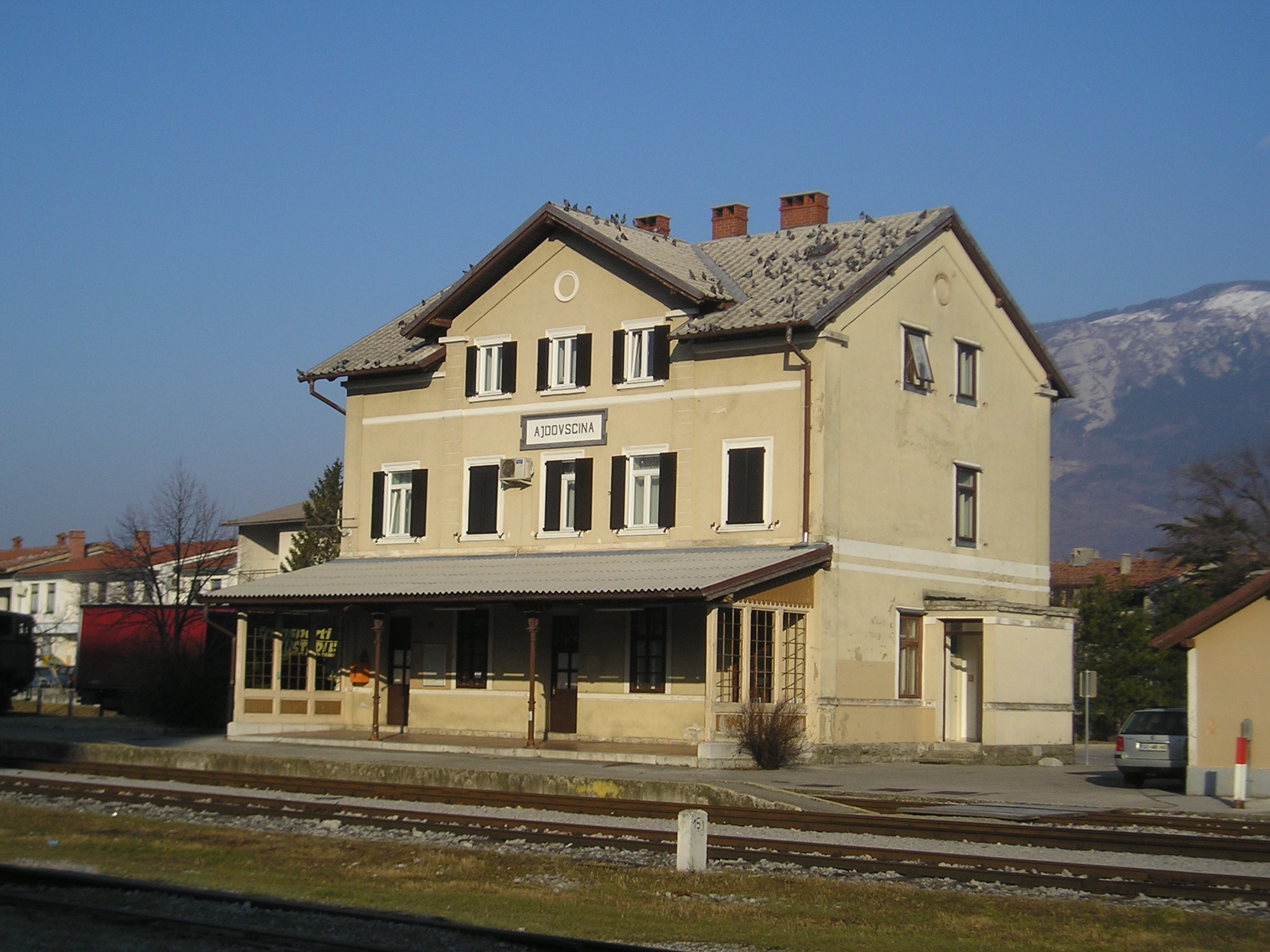

General information
- Location: 5270 Ajdovščina; Slovenia
- Coordinates: 45°53′10″N 13°54′01″E
- Owner: Slovenian Railways
- Operator: Slovenian Railways
Location
- Location within Slovenia

Ajdovščina railway station (Slovene: Železniška postaja Ajdovščina) is the principal railway station in Ajdovščina, Slovenia.
