= JŽ series 310/314 =

JŽ 310
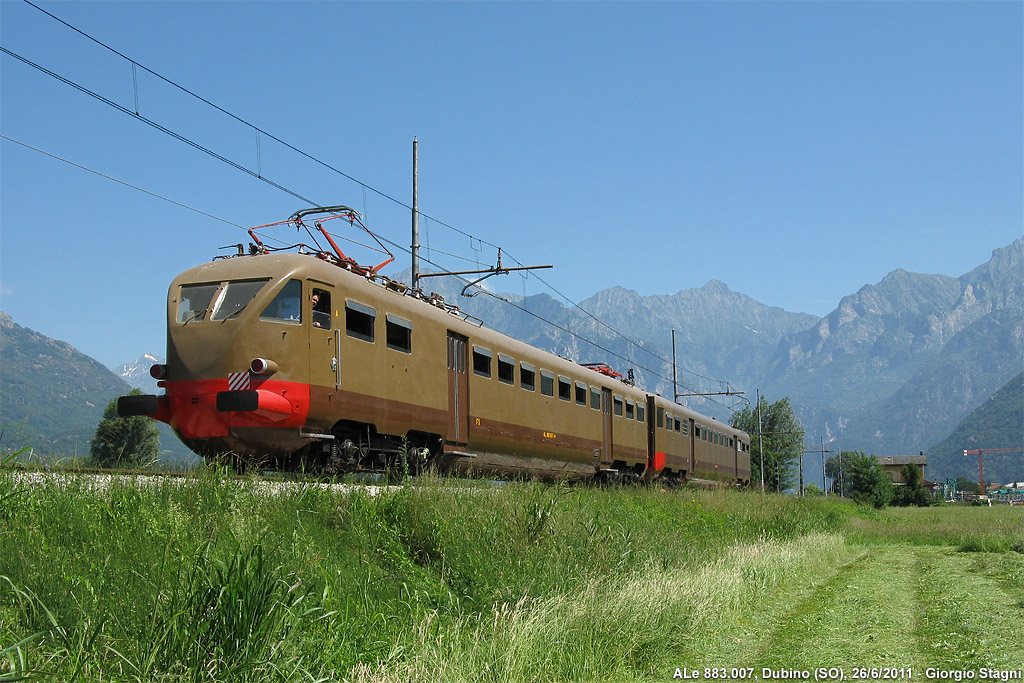

Specifications
- Electric system(s): 3000 V DC overhead

The JŽ Series 310 was a 3000V DC electric multiple unit once operated by the Yugoslav State Railways (JŽ).

Only one unit of the class existed, consisting of three cars, numbered 310.001, 314.001 and 314.002. The unit was an ex FS class ALe 883 (it:FS ALe 883).

== See also ==
- SŽ series 310, Slovenian railways has operated a class 310 unit - these are post breakup vehicles, of Pendolino type.
