= Domžale railway station =

Railway station in Domžale, Slovenia

Domžale
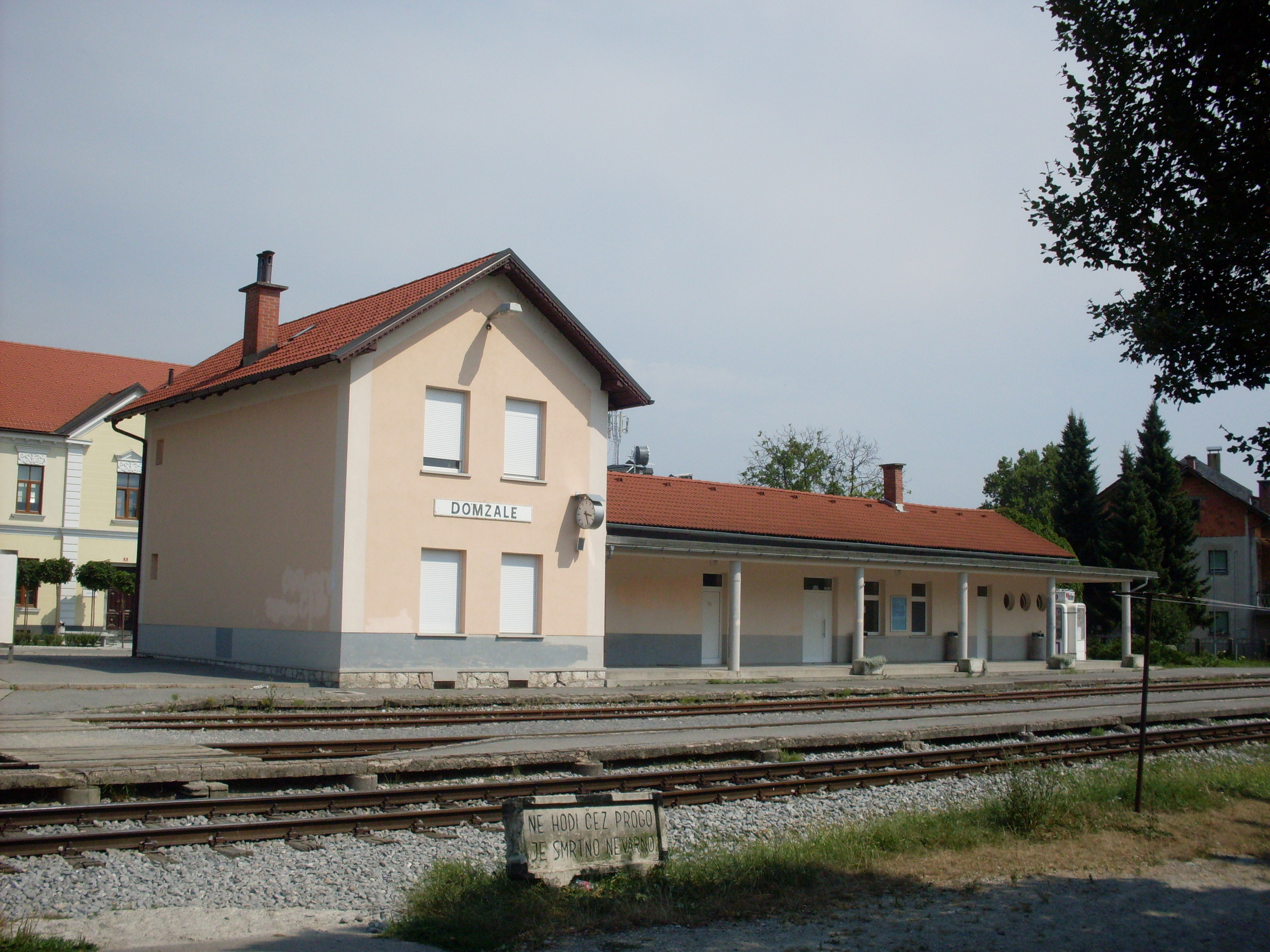

General information
- Location: 1230 Domžale; Slovenia
- Coordinates: 46°8′21″N 14°35′33″E
- Owner: Slovenian Railways
- Operator: Slovenian Railways
Location
- Location within Slovenia

Domžale railway station (Slovene: Železniška postaja Domžale) is the principal railway station in Domžale, Slovenia.
