= Cargo 10 =

Cargo 10 (or Cargo X) is a joint railway company set up by the national railway companies of Croatia, Serbia and Slovenia. The name is a reference to the Pan-European Corridor X. Cargo 10 aims to shorten the distance and increase efficiency of rail freight transport along Corridor X, by speeding up border proceedings, and attract traffic from Corridor IV.

== See also ==
- Croatian Railways
- Serbian Railways
- Slovenian Railways
