= Ormož railway station =

Railway station in Ormož, Slovenia

Ormož
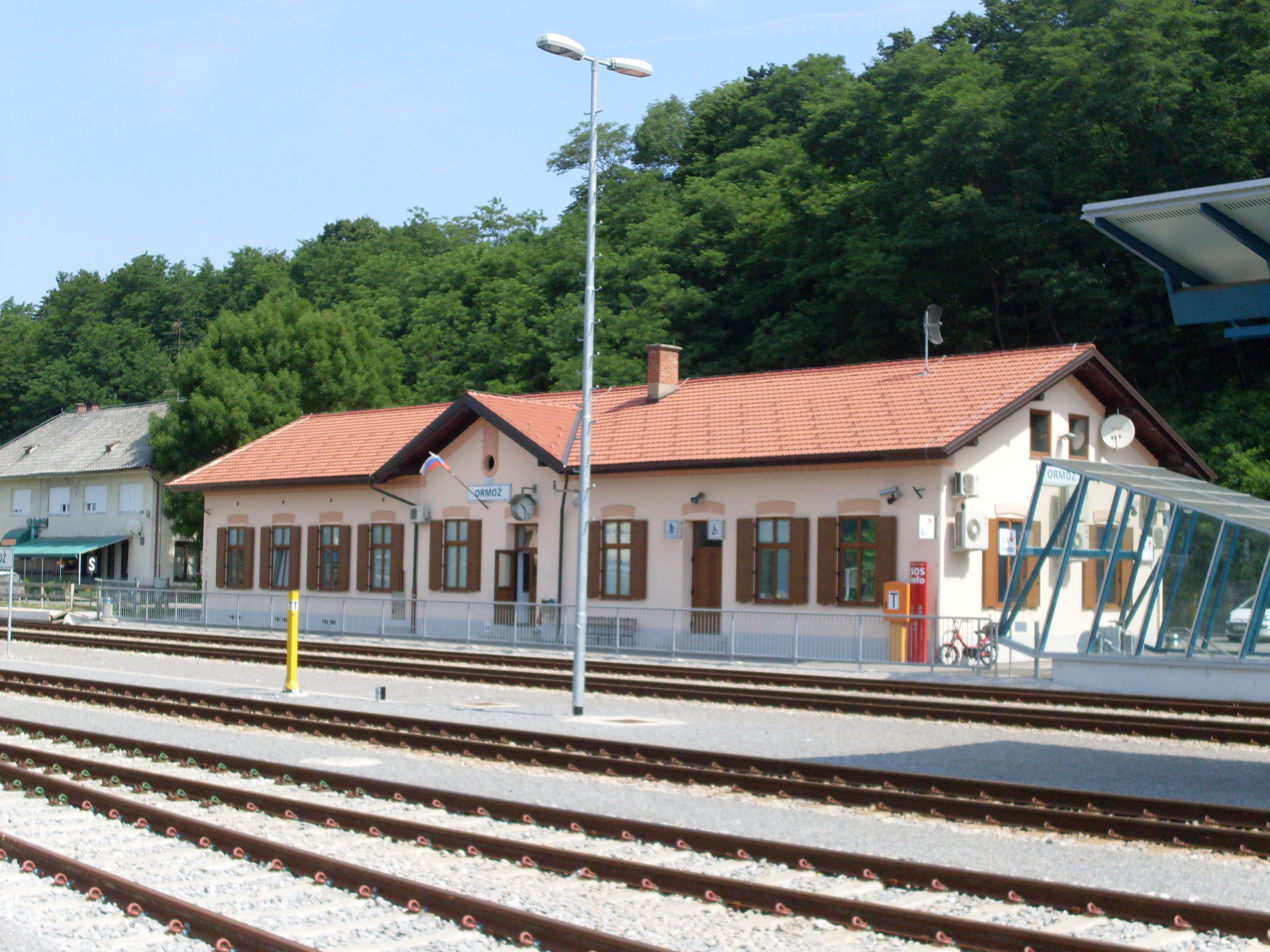
- The station building.

General information
- Location: Kolodvorska cesta 13; 2270 Ormož; Slovenia
- Coordinates: 46°24′13″N 16°09′24″E
- Owner: Slovenske železnice
- Operator: Slovenske železnice
- Lines: Pragersko–Središče, Ormož-Hodoš
Location
- Location within Slovenia

Ormož railway station (Slovene: Železniška postaja Ormož) is the railway station in Ormož, Slovenia, which lies on the left bank of the Drava River and borders with Croatia on that river's opposite bank.

The station is located on the Pragersko–Središče Railway line connecting Pragersko, where there is a junction with the main line between Ljubljana and Maribor, with Čakovec in Croatia. From Ormož another line branches off to Murska Sobota and Hodoš.
