= Murska Sobota railway station =

Railway station in Murska Sobota, Slovenia

Murska Sobota

General information
- Location: Ulica Ob Progi; 9000 Murska Sobota; Slovenia
- Coordinates: 46°39′34″N 16°10′18″E
- Owner: Slovenske železnice
- Operator: Slovenske železnice
- Line: Ormož–Hodoš state border

History
- Opened: 1924
Location
- Location within Slovenia

Murska Sobota railway station (Slovene: Železniška postaja Murska Sobota) serves the municipality of Murska Sobota, Slovenia. It was opened in 1924.

On 29 January 2010, the first Holocaust memorial in Slovenia was unveiled at the station. It is dedicated to the memory of the once-significant Jewish community of the Prekmurje region. The members of the community were arrested by the Hungarian authorities in 1944 and transported to Hungary proper and Croatia, from which they were then deported to the Auschwitz concentration camp in Nazi Germany.
