= Hodoš railway station =

Railway station in Hodoš, Slovenia

Hodoš
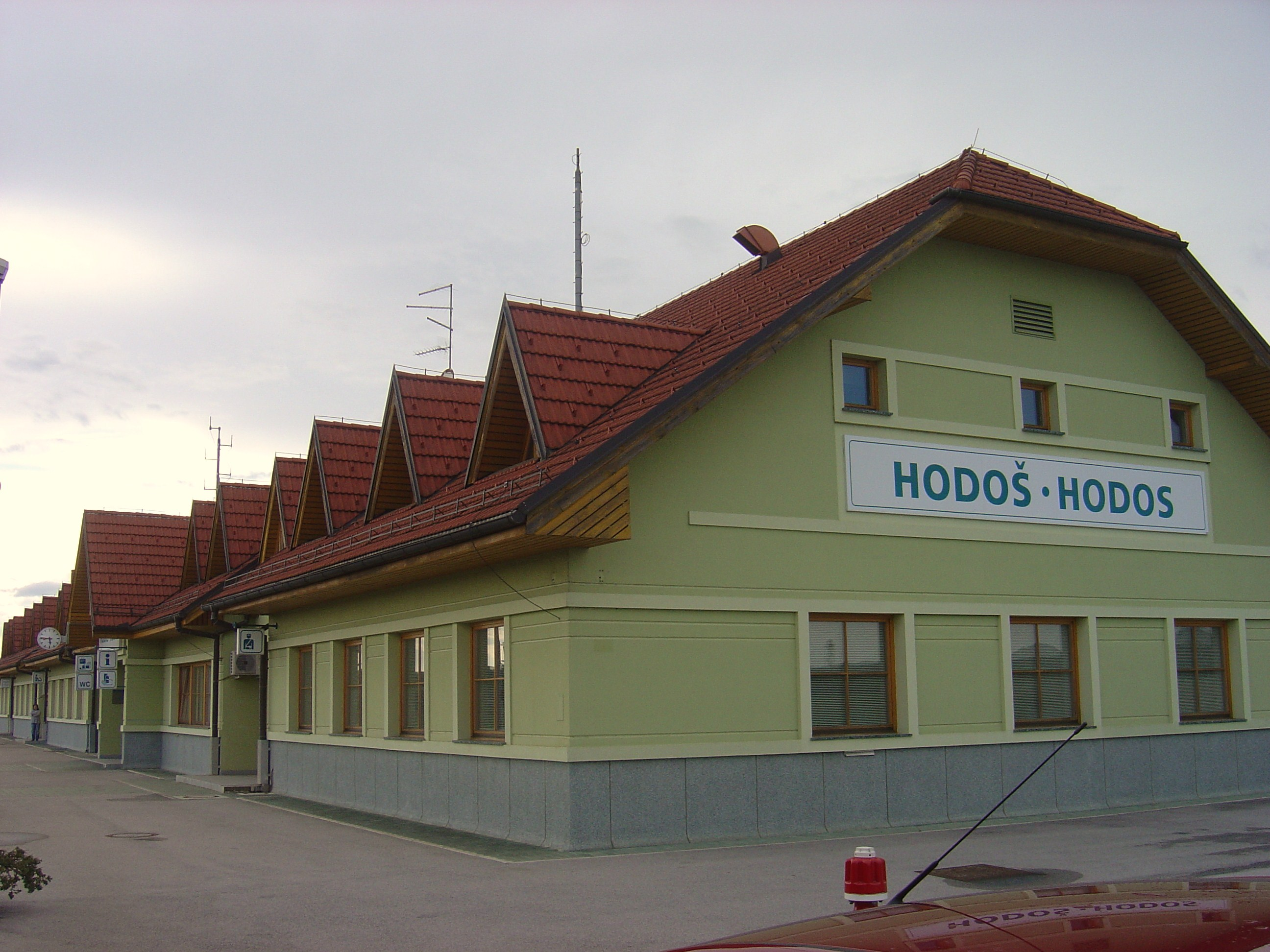

General information
- Location: 9205 Hodoš; Slovenia
- Coordinates: 46°49′13″N 16°19′45″E
- Owner: Slovenske železnice
- Operator: Slovenske železnice

History
- Opened: 1907
Location
- Location within Slovenia

Hodoš railway station (Slovene: Železniška postaja Hodoš; Hungarian: Őrihodos or Hodos vasútállomás) serves the municipality of Hodoš, Slovenia. It was opened in 1907, and is the last station on the line from Ormož, Slovenia, before the border crossing between Slovenia and Hungary.

The portion of the Ormož–Hodoš line between Murska Sobota and Hodoš was closed in 1968, along with many similar line closures elsewhere in Slovenia. However, in 1999-2001 the line was rebuilt, in a less winding form, as part of one of the new European transit corridors. The rebuilt line is designed to cater for international trains travelling at up to 160 kilometres per hour (99 mph).

Since the completion of the rebuilding work, Hodoš railway station has been the shared border station on the only railway line crossing the border between Slovenia and Hungary.
