= Ilirska Bistrica railway station =

Railway station in Slovenia

Ilirska Bistrica
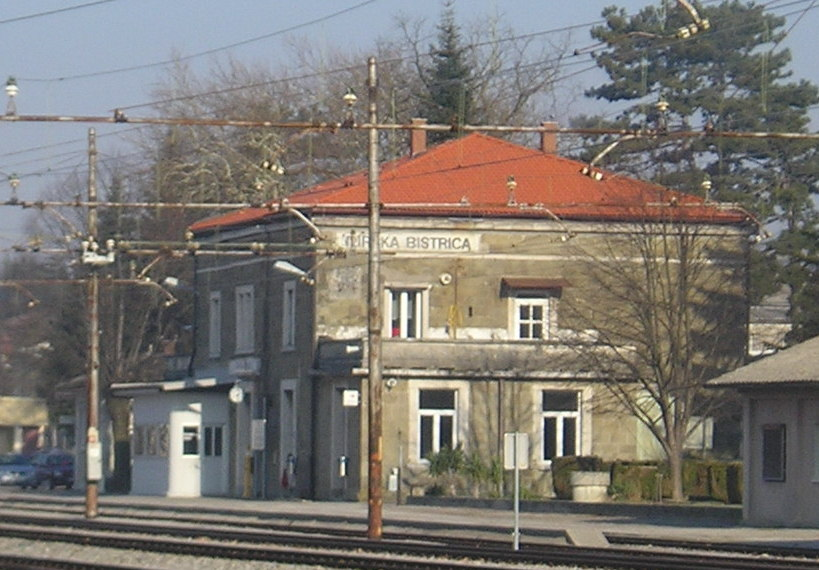

General information
- Location: Vojkov drevored 6250 Ilirska Bistrica; Slovenia
- Coordinates: 45°34′10″N 14°14′10″E
- Owner: Slovenske železnice
- Operator: Slovenske železnice

History
- Opened: 1873
Location
- Location within Slovenia

Ilirska Bistrica railway station (Slovene: Železniška postaja Ilirska Bistrica) serves the nearby village of Ilirska Bistrica, Slovenia. It was opened in 1873, and is also a border station for trains to Rijeka, Croatia.
