= Ilirska Bistrica =

- Town
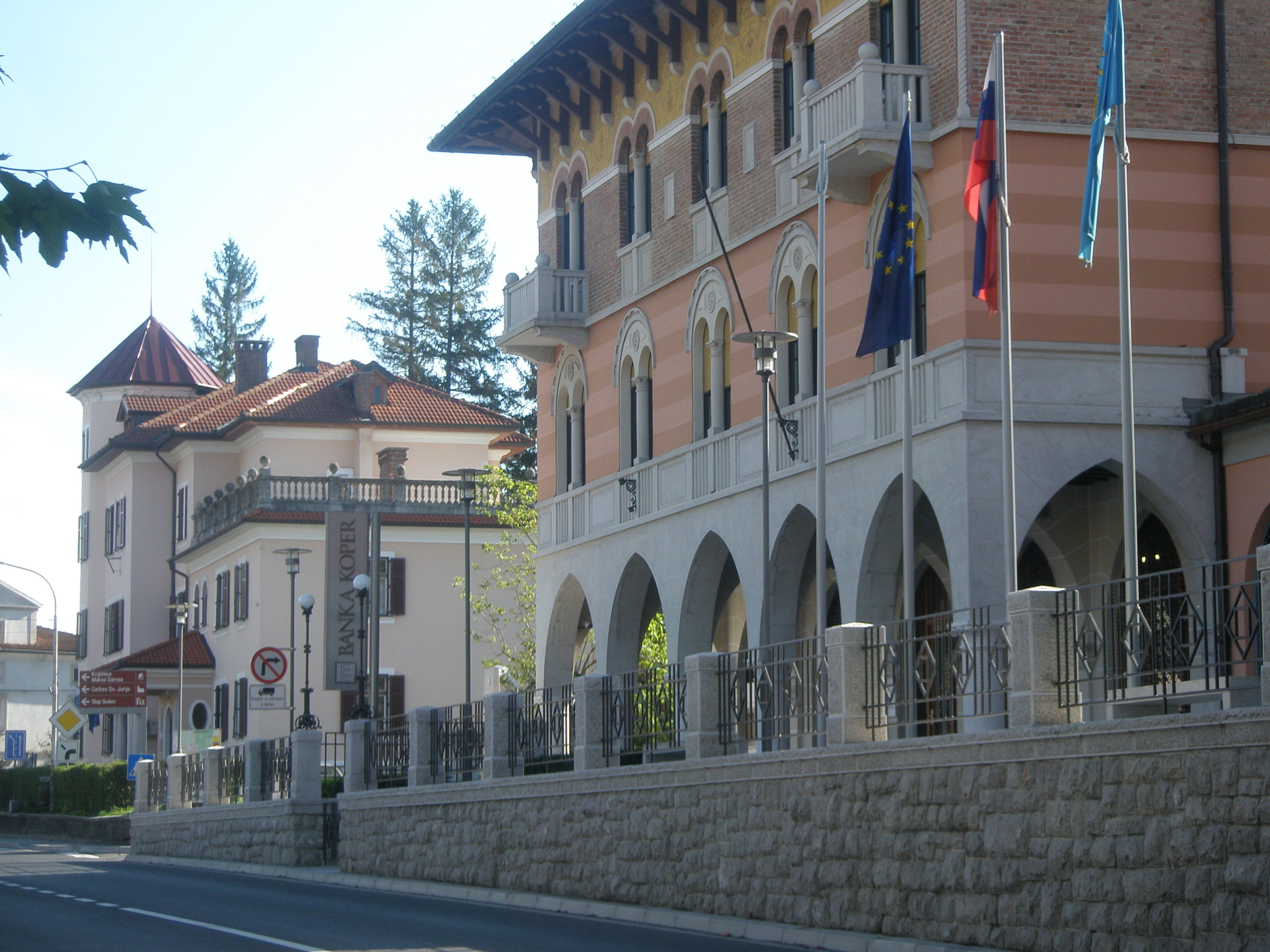
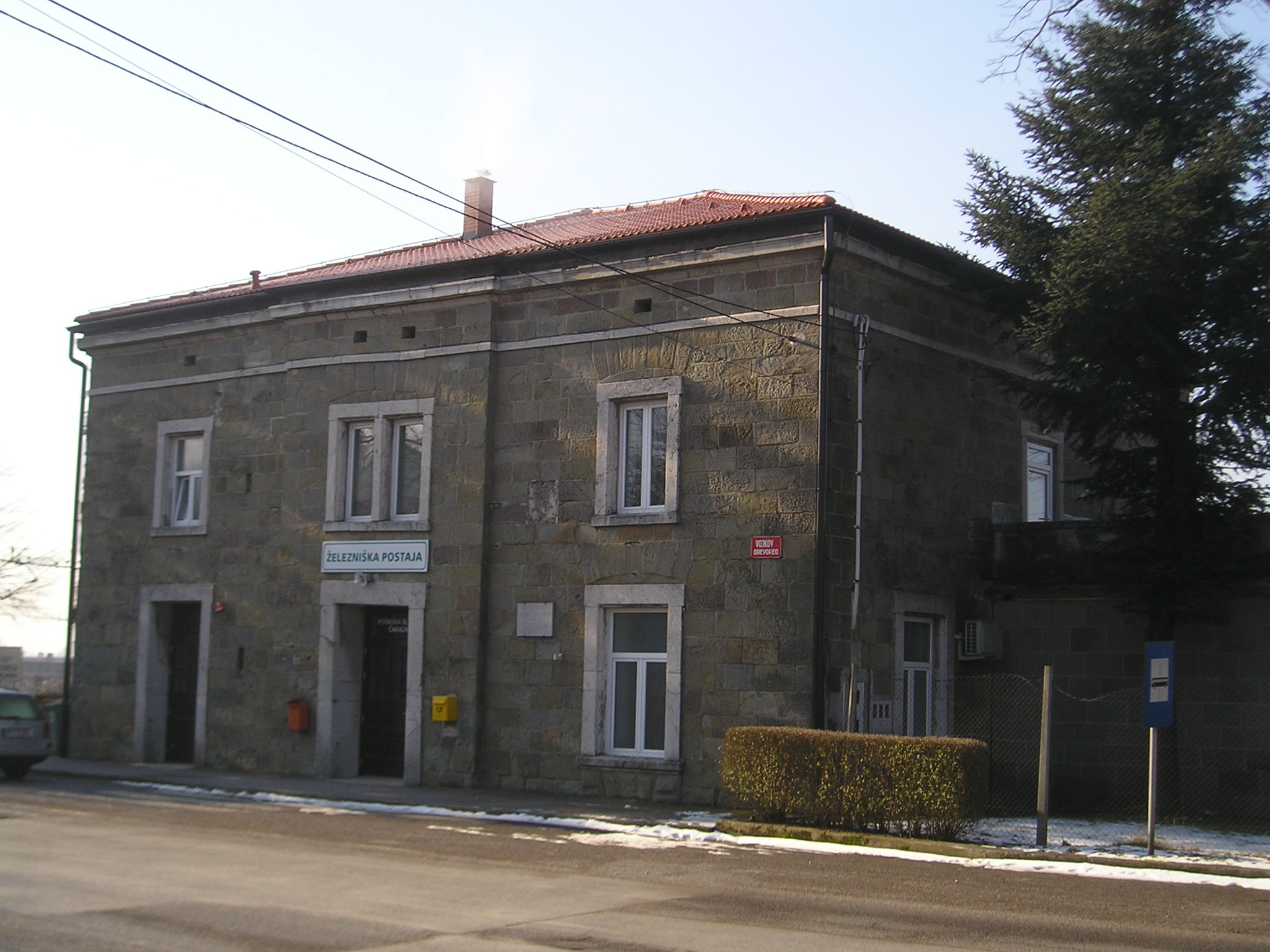
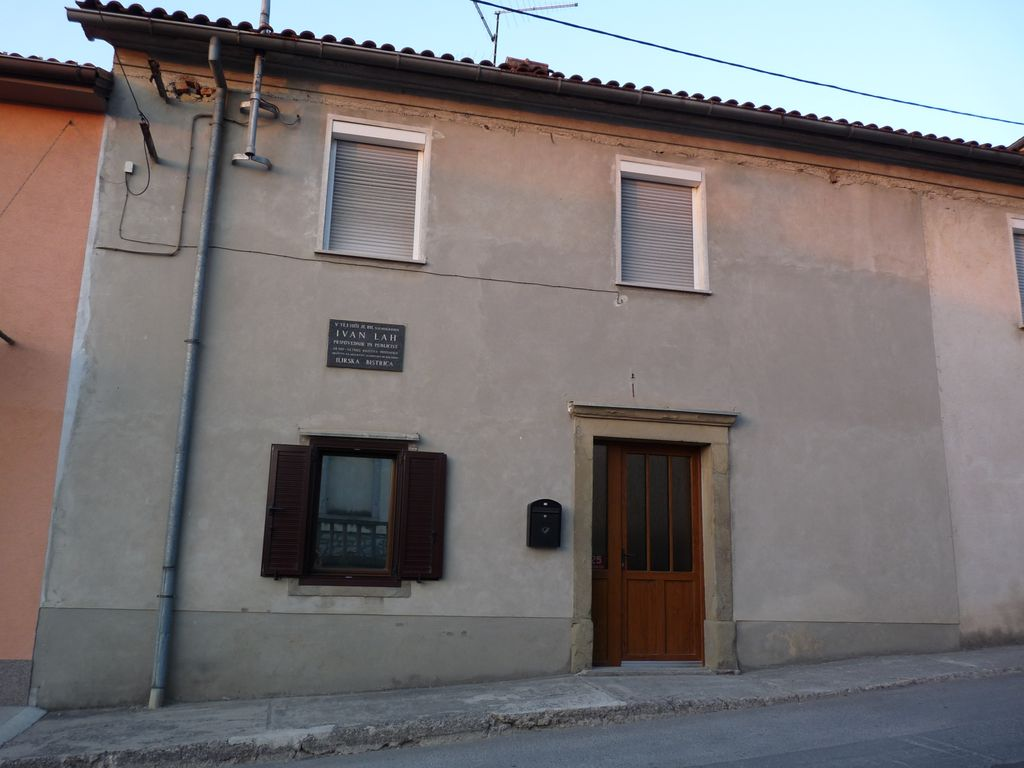
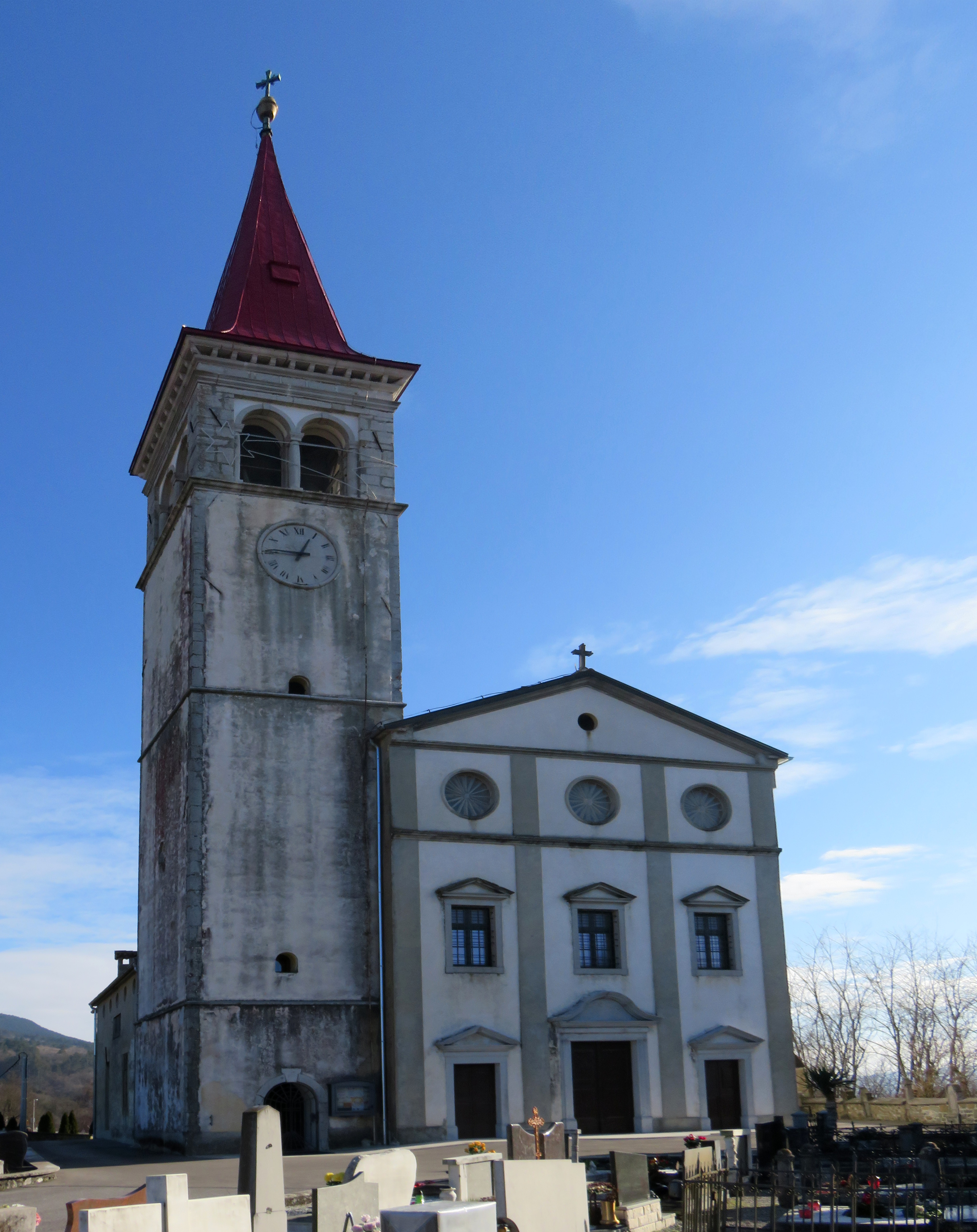
- From top, left to right: Town Hall and the Center, Railway station, Ivan Lah house, St. Peter's Church

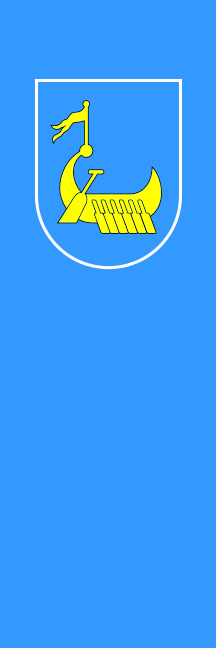
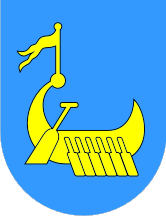
- Flag Seal

- Location in Slovenia
- Coordinates: 45°34′4.46″N 14°15′9.69″E
- Country: Slovenia
- Traditional region: Inner Carniola
- Statistical region: Littoral–Inner Carniola
- Municipality: Ilirska Bistrica
- Town: 1933
- Town proclamation: 1952

Government
  - Mayor: Gregor Kovačič (Independent)

Area
  - Total: 34.8 km^{2} (13.4 sq mi)
- Elevation: 421.2 m (1,382 ft)

Population (2012)
  - Total: 4,539
  - Density: 130/km^{2} (338/sq mi)
- Time zone: UTC+1 (CET)
  - Summer (DST): UTC+2 (CEST)
- Vehicle registration: KP
- Climate: Cfb

Ilirska Bistrica (pronounced [iˈlíːɾska ˈbíːstɾitsa]; German: Illyrisch Feistritz; Italian: Villa del Nevoso, before 1927: Bisterza, Hungarian: Illírbeszterce) is a town in the Inner Carniola region of southwestern Slovenia. It is the administrative seat of the Municipality of Ilirska Bistrica.

== Name ==
The name Ilirska Bistrica means 'Illyrian Bistrica', it has its origin during the times of the Austrian Empire, when the area was part of the Kingdom of Illyria, an administrative unit between 1816 and 1849. The adjective Ilirska (German: Illyrisch) was added to the old name Bistrica (Feistritz), differentiating it from other towns in the general area such as Feistritz im Rosental (Slovene: Bistrica v Rožu) or Slovenska Bistrica (German: Windisch-Feistritz).

The town's coat of arms represents the history of the region, recalling the pre-Slavic Illyrian people that once populated the area, along with their shipbuilding past. The town's current coat of arms was adopted in the mid-19th century and is only a slight modification of the coat of arms of the Kingdom of Illyria.

== Geography ==
The town centre is located on the ancient road from Postojna and Pivka to Rijeka on the Adriatic coast. It is situated in the valley of the Reka River, on the steep rim of the densely wooded Snežnik plateau in the northeast. In the southwest, the Brkini Hills form the natural border with the Slovene Littoral (Slovene Istria) historical region.

== History ==
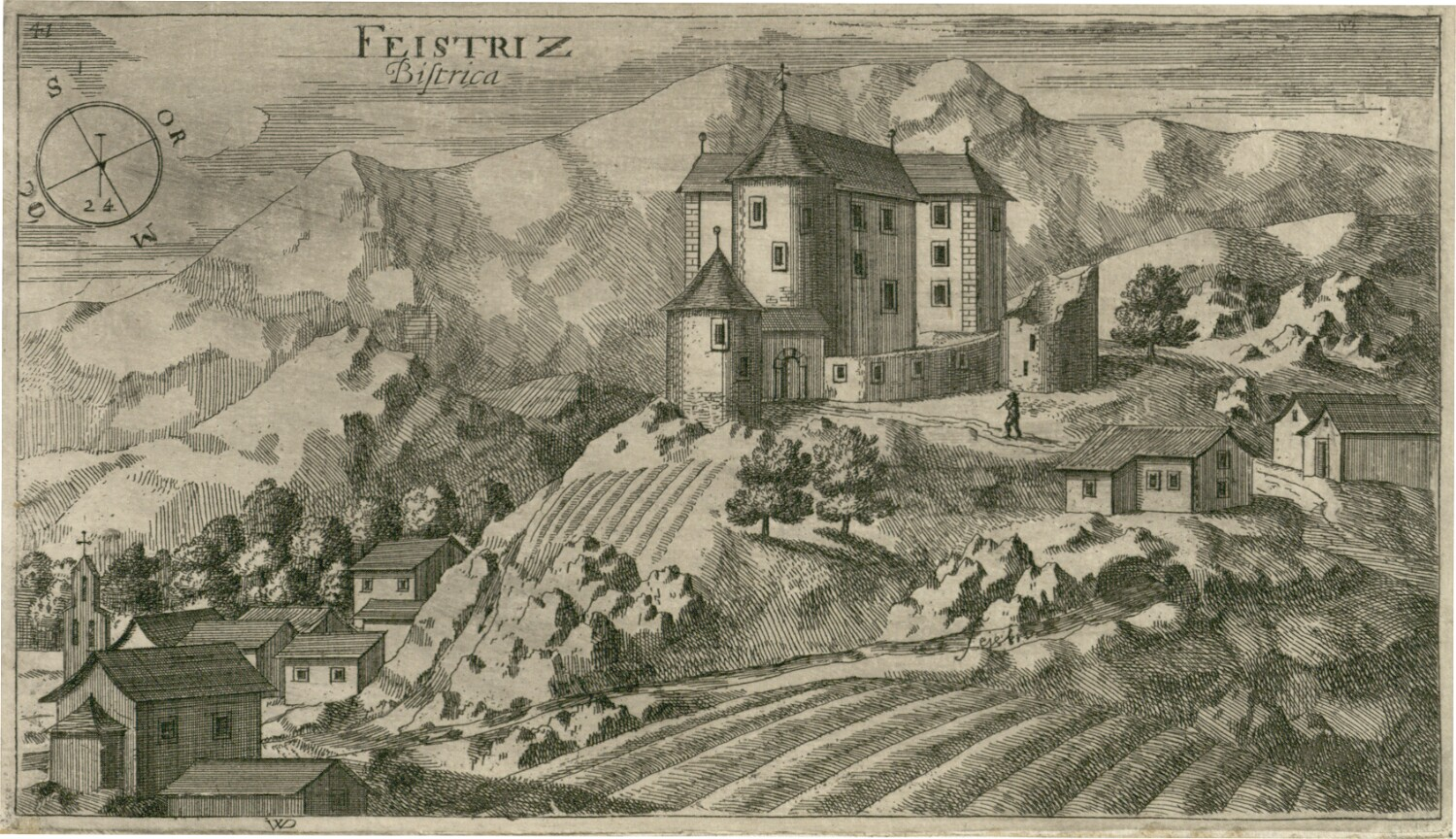
Bistrica Castle as documented by Johann Weikhard von Valvasor, 1679

In the 12th century a fortress was erected at the site of a prehistoric settlement on a hill east of the town centre, when the area was part of the Imperial March of Carniola. The castle later was held by the Counts of Duino, from the 14th century onwards by the princely House of Auersperg in Postojna. The settlement of Ilirska Bistrica itself was first mentioned about 1300; its advantageous location, the surrounding karst springs and extended forests promoted the economic development of numerous sawmills and a flourishing timber trade from the early 15th century onwards. Located in the Duchy of Carniola the town for centuries was part of the Habsburg monarchy. In the 19th century, it was part of the Inner Carniola Kreis. The Ilirska Bistrica wood merchants mainly supplied the Austrian seaports of Trieste and Rijeka. In 1873 a railway line was opened by the Austrian Southern Railway company, running from Pivka and the Southern Railway line via the Ilirska Bistrica railway station to the coastal cities of Opatija and Rijeka.

Within the last 100 years, the town's history has been primarily shaped by the nations that it has belonged to. Ilirska Bistrica became part of the Austrian part of the Austro-Hungarian Empire in 1867, it was annexed by the Kingdom of Italy with the Treaty of Rapallo in 1920, and it became part of Yugoslavia after World War II. Remnants of these various states can still be seen in numerous monuments, the railway station, and the Italian barracks from the Second World War. Today it belongs to independent Slovenia.

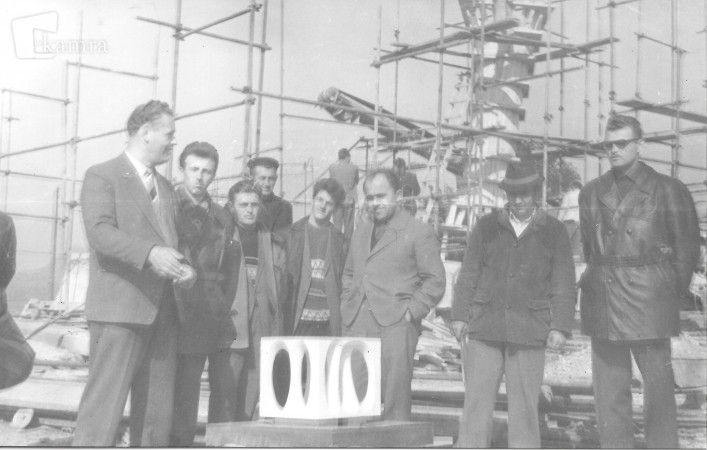
Construction of the Monument (Spomenik) on Freedom Hill, Ilirska Bistrica, 1965

During last days of World War II, the 97th Army Corps under command of German General der Gebirgstruppe Ludwig Kübler were defending the defensive area between Rijeka and Mount Snežnik, also known as Ingridstellung or defensive line Ingrid. Their task was to halt the Yugoslav advance toward Trieste and Ljubljana, threatening the rear of both Army Groups C and E. The 97th Army Corps became encircled in the area around Ilirska Bistrica and Mount Snežnik, when Tito ordered the 4th Army to bypass the 97th Corps and capture Trieste. Only after the Partisans captured Trieste was the 97th Corps ordered to break through toward Iliriska Bistrica, Postojna, and Ljubljana. The breakthrough began on the night of May 2 in a hedgehog formation. During May 5 and 6, the corps managed to capture Iliriska Bistrica, but further advance became impossible and on May 7 at 6:04 am a capitulation was signed. Around 16,000 soldiers, 40 senior officers, and three generals become prisoners of war. Captured equipment included 31 tanks, 841 artillery pieces, 536 mortars, 1,670 machine guns, 2,468 light machine guns, and 716 various motor vehicles.

The neighboring village of Trnovo was annexed by Ilirska Bistrica in 1952.

On June 27, 1991, during the Ten-Day War, the Slovenian Territorial Defence blocked the road connecting Rijeka and its 13th Infantry Corps of Yugoslav People's Army with the interior of Slovenia. Later on the same day, the Slovenian Territorial Defence launched an attack on a Yugoslav People's Army column in Koseze near Ilirska Bistrica. After fierce fighting between the Slovenian Territorial Defence and Yugoslav People's Army, the Yugoslav People's Army retreated. The battle resulted in three dead Yugoslav People's Army soldiers and several wounded soldiers on both sides.

On August 1, 2023, a rare tornado touched down in Ilirska Bistrica, damaging houses and felling trees.

Historical population
Year	1948	1953	1961	1971	1981	1991	2002	2011	2021
Pop.	3,374	3,637	3,720	4,190	4,909	4,941	4,869	4,553	4,350
±%	—	+7.8%	+2.3%	+12.6%	+17.2%	+0.7%	−1.5%	−6.5%	−4.5%
Population size may be affected by changes in administrative divisions.

=== Mass graves ===
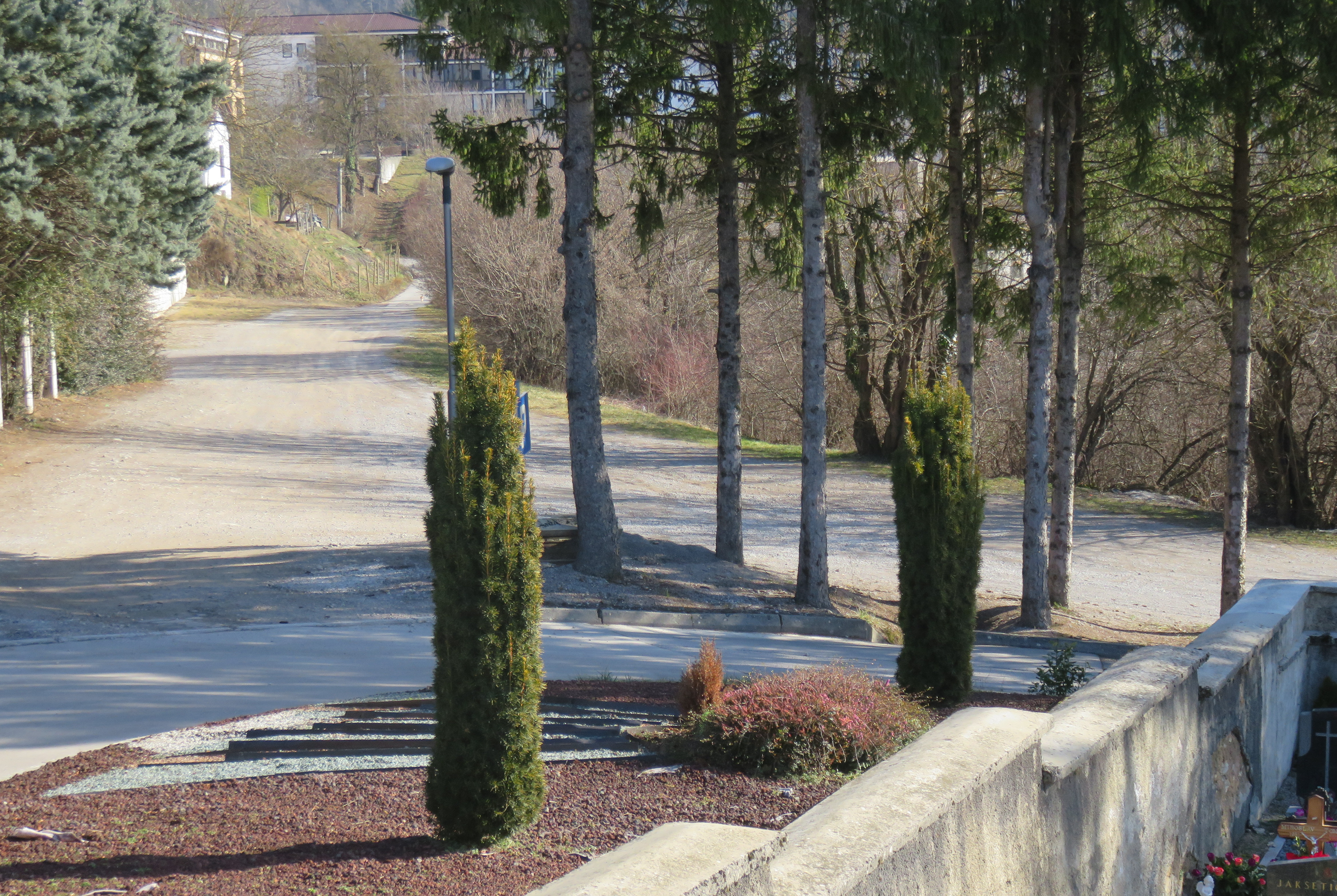
Cemetery Mass Grave

Ilirska Bistrica is the site of two known mass graves from the Second World War. The Stražica Mass Grave (Slovene: Grobišče pod Stražico), also known as the Black Fields Mass Grave (Grobišče Črne njive), is located north of the town, about 170 meters (560 ft) north of the summit of Stražica Hill. It contained the remains of German soldiers from the 97th Corps that fell at the beginning of May 1945. The grave has been exhumed. The Cemetery Mass Grave (Grobišče pod pokopališčem) is located next to the town cemetery. It contains the remains of 82 German soldiers buried in a former firing trench. An asphalt road and parking lot were laid over the grave when the cemetery was expanded.

== Notable people ==
- Dragotin Kette (1876–1899), poet
- Rado Pehaček (1913–1983), Yugoslav Partisan hero, later general-colonel in People's Liberation Army of Yugoslavia
- Vlado Valenčič (1903–1999), historian
- Dragan Živadinov (born 1960), theatre director

== Church ==
The parish church in the town is dedicated to Saint Peter and belongs to the Koper Diocese. It stands in the former village of Trnovo. A second church in the town is dedicated to Saint George.

== Recreation ==
The town is used by tourists and trekkers as a starting point for travelling to the top of the Snežnik Plateau, a day-long round trip from Ilirska Bistrica. At 1,796 m (5,892 ft), the plateau's highest peak, Big Mount Snežnik (Slovene: Veliki Snežnik), is the highest non-Alpine peak in Slovenia.

== Sports ==
=== Basketball ===
Ilirska Bistrica is the hometown of the KK Plama Pur basketball club, which competes in the Slovenian Second Basketball League.

=== Football ===
Ilirska Bistrica is the hometown of the NK Ilirska Bistrica football club, which competes in the Slovenian Third League.

=== Other sports ===
Ilirska Bistrica also has several other clubs and associations, such as the Ilirska Bistrica Handball Club, several karate clubs, and an archery club.
