= SŽ series 713/715 =

SŽ 713/715
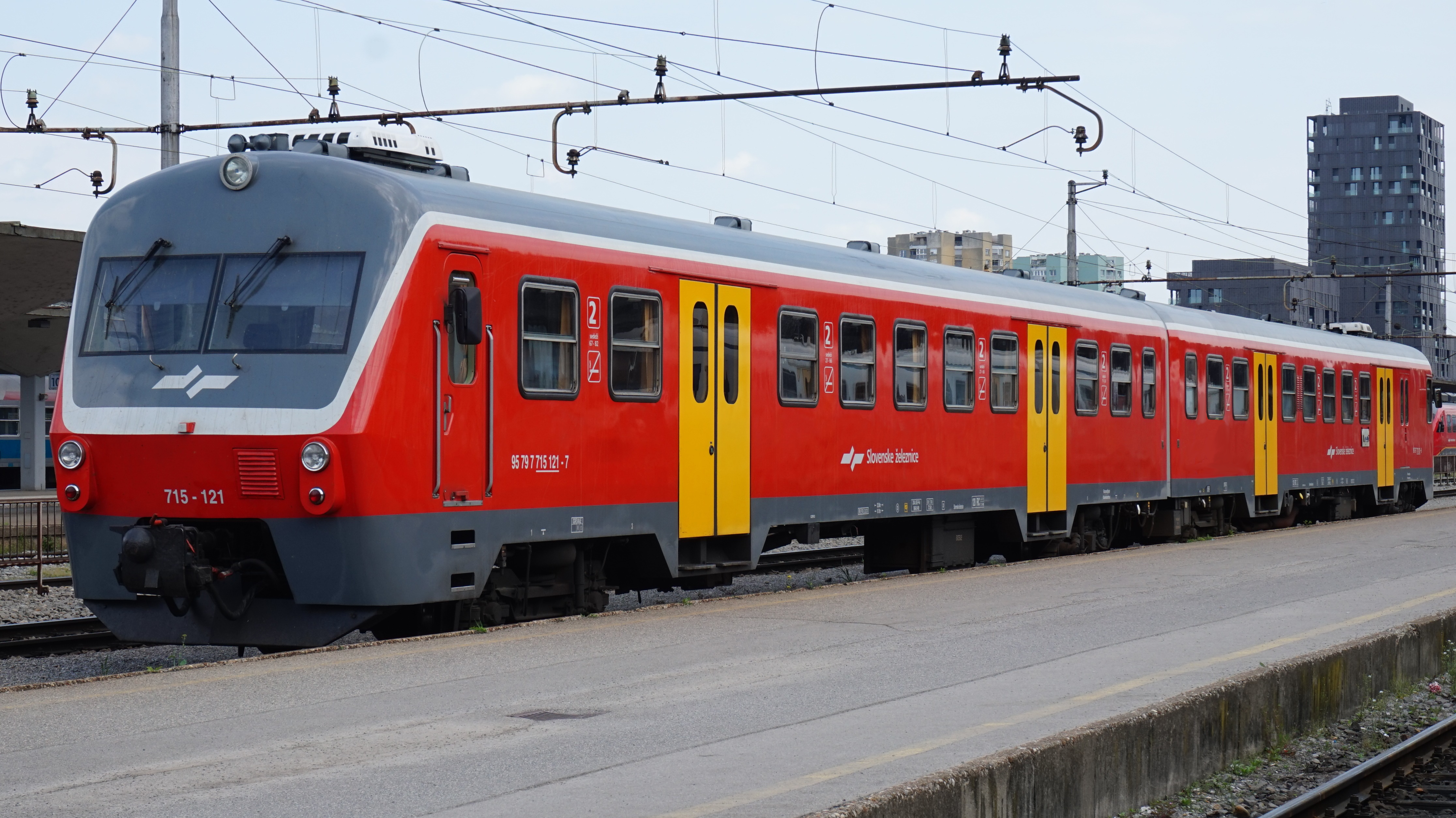
- Manufacturer: MBB Donauwörth / TVT Boris Kidrič Maribor
- Constructed: 1983–1986
- Number built: 27
- Formation: 2-car sets (M+P)
- Operator: Slovenian Railways

Specifications
- Train length: 48 m (157 ft 6 in)
- Width: 2.87 m (9 ft 5 in)
- Maximum speed: 120 km/h (75 mph)
- Weight: 60 tonnes (59 long tons; 66 short tons)
- Power output: 400 kW (536 hp)
- Transmission: Hydraulic
- UIC classification: 2'B' + 2'2'
- Multiple working: 4
- Track gauge: 1,435 mm (4 ft 8 1/2 in) standard gauge

SŽ series 713/715 is a two-car diesel multiple unit series of the Slovenian Railways, built between 1983 and 1986. A set consists of a motor wagon, numbered as 713, and a trailer, numbered as 715. These units operate on non-electrified tracks, mostly on the Ljubljana–Novo Mesto–Metlika, Sevnica–Trebnje and Ljubljana–Kamnik lines. Because of the previous colour scheme the units are popularly nicknamed "kanarček" (canary).

== History ==
The units were designed in the MBB Donauwörth company in Germany with cooperation of Yugoslav engineers. The first five sets were built in MBB Donauwörth and finished in the TVT Boris Kidrič Maribor factory, and the rest of them (22 sets) were built in Maribor out of parts sent from Germany.

The series was built in two versions, as a first-class business train (5 sets of subseries 713-0xx, in green colour scheme, with 92 revolvable seats, a kitchen and loudspeakers) and as a standard commuter train (22 sets of subseries 713-1xx, in yellow-and-orange colour scheme, with 128 seats). All of the business trains were later converted into standard trains, and the colour scheme of all units is gradually being changed into red.

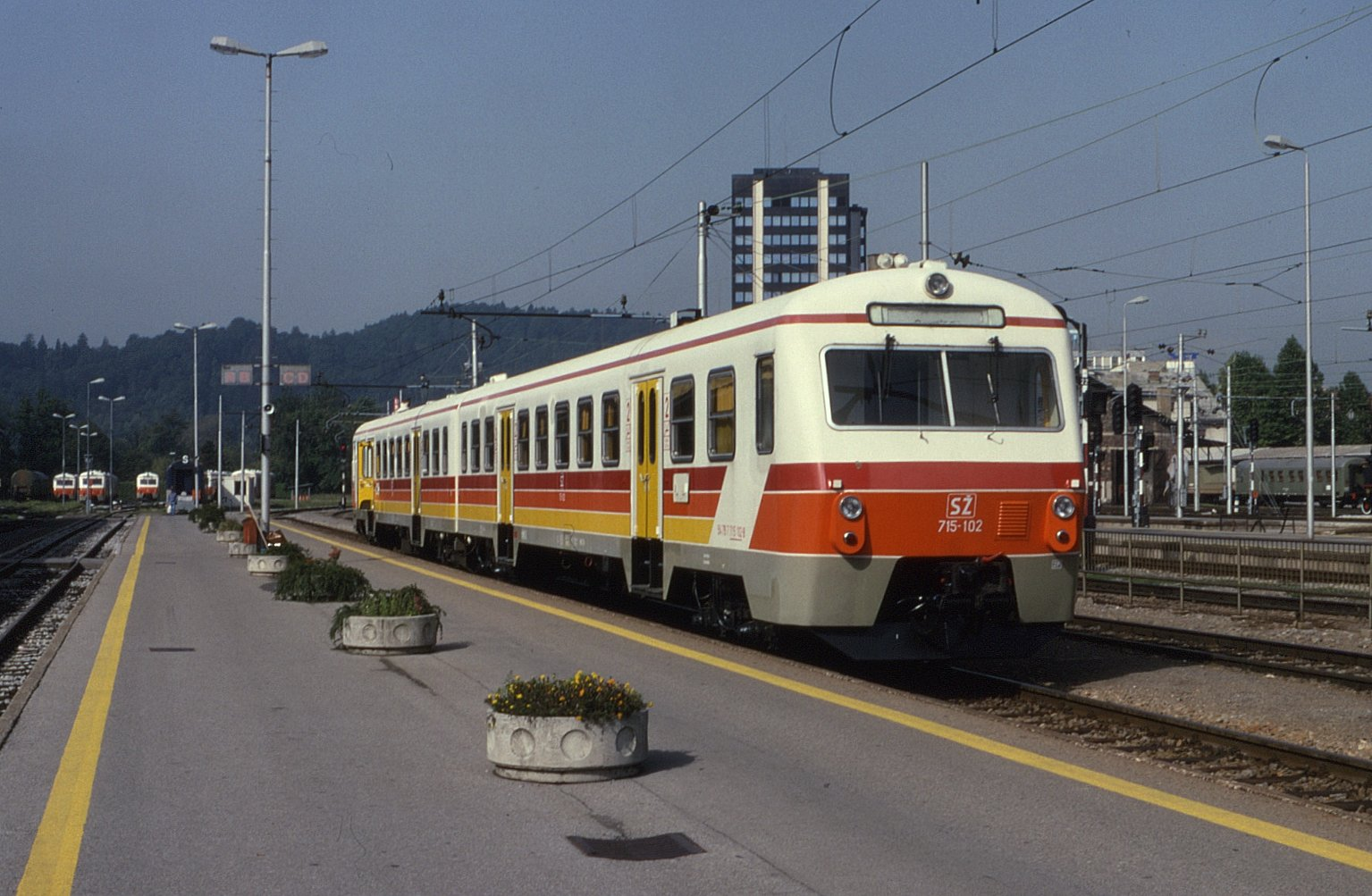
A SŽ 713/715 unit in legacy yellow-and-orange colour scheme

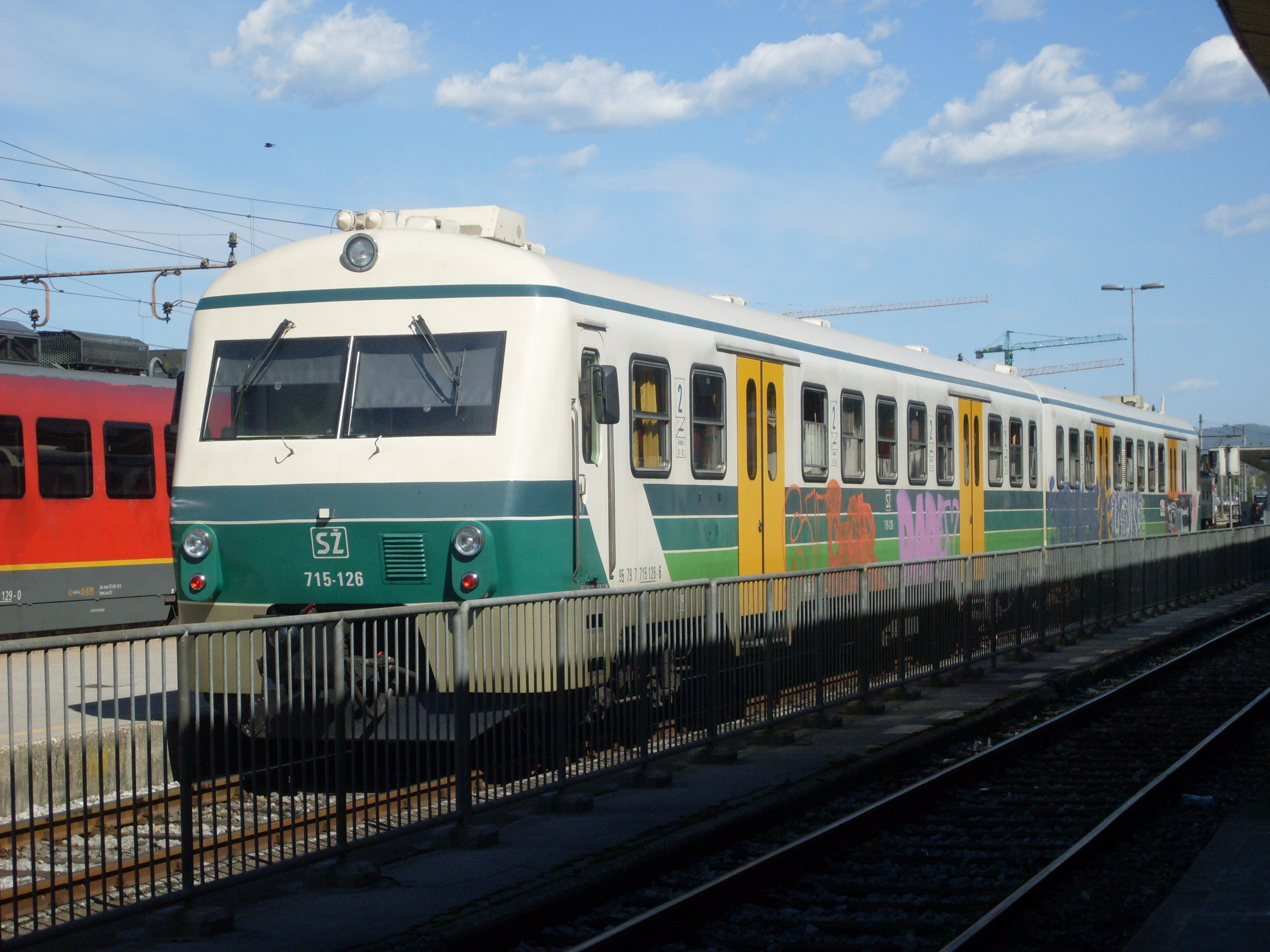
Former business unit, still bearing green colour scheme

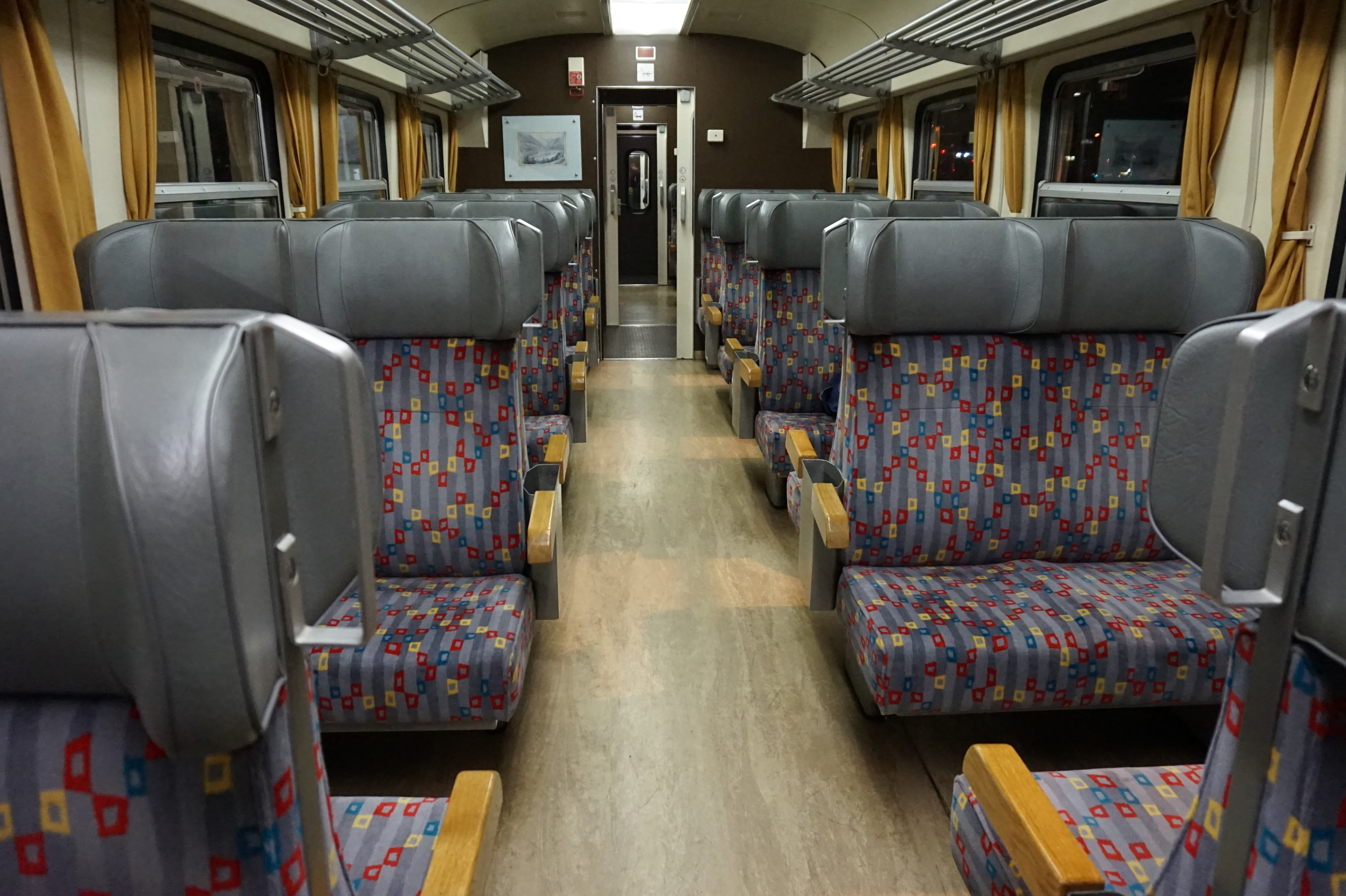
Interior
