= Ljutomer railway station =

Railway station in Slovenia

Ljutomer
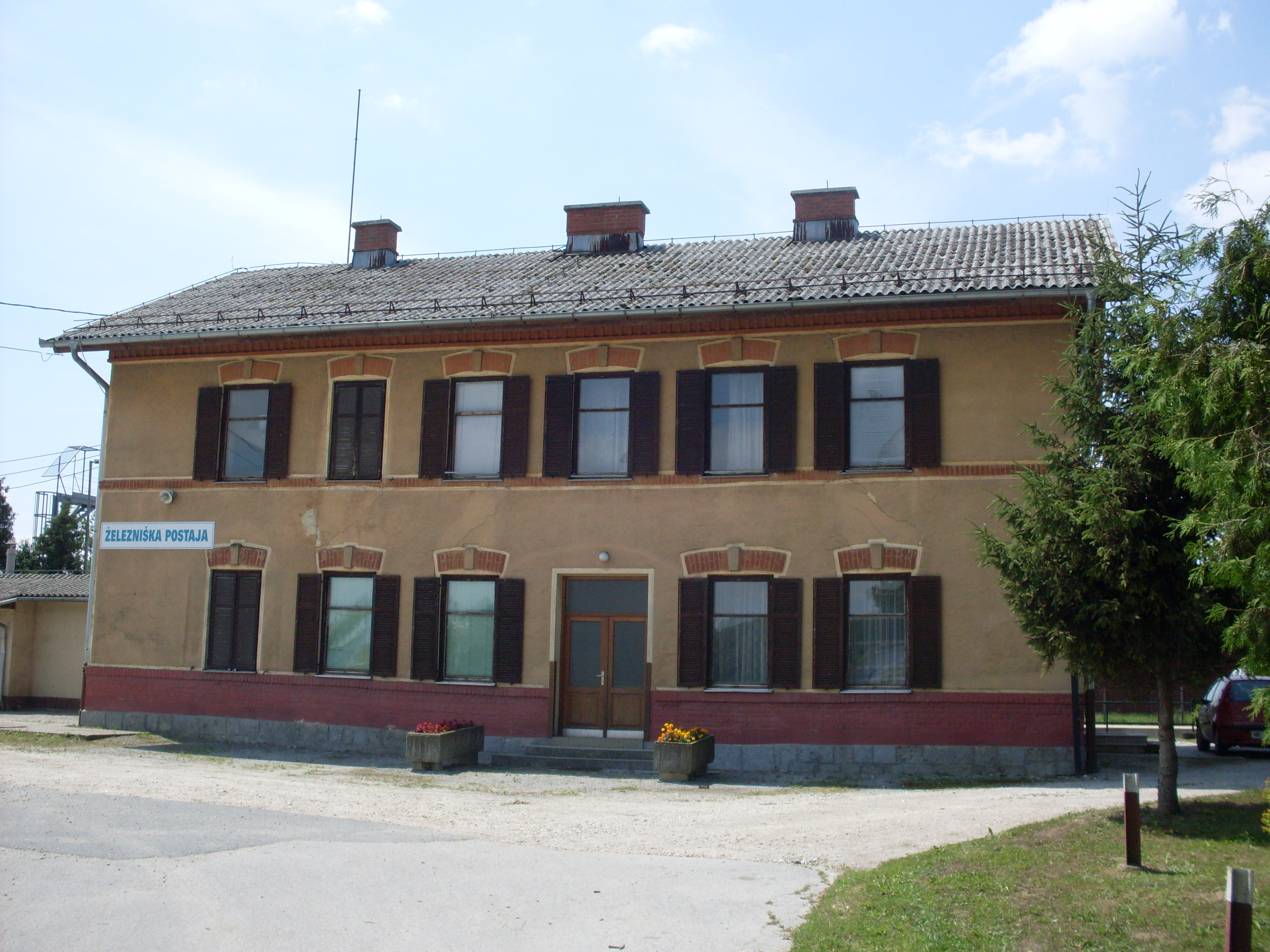

General information
- Location: Kolodvorska ulica 9240 Ljutomer; Slovenia
- Coordinates: 46°31′44″N 16°11′22″E
- Owner: Slovenske železnice
- Operator: Slovenske železnice

History
- Opened: 1890
Location
- Location within Slovenia

Ljutomer railway station (Slovene: Železniška postaja Ljutomer) serves the municipality of Ljutomer, Slovenia. It was opened in 1890, and became a junction station in 1924.
