= SŽ series 310 =

Multiple unit

SŽ Class 310
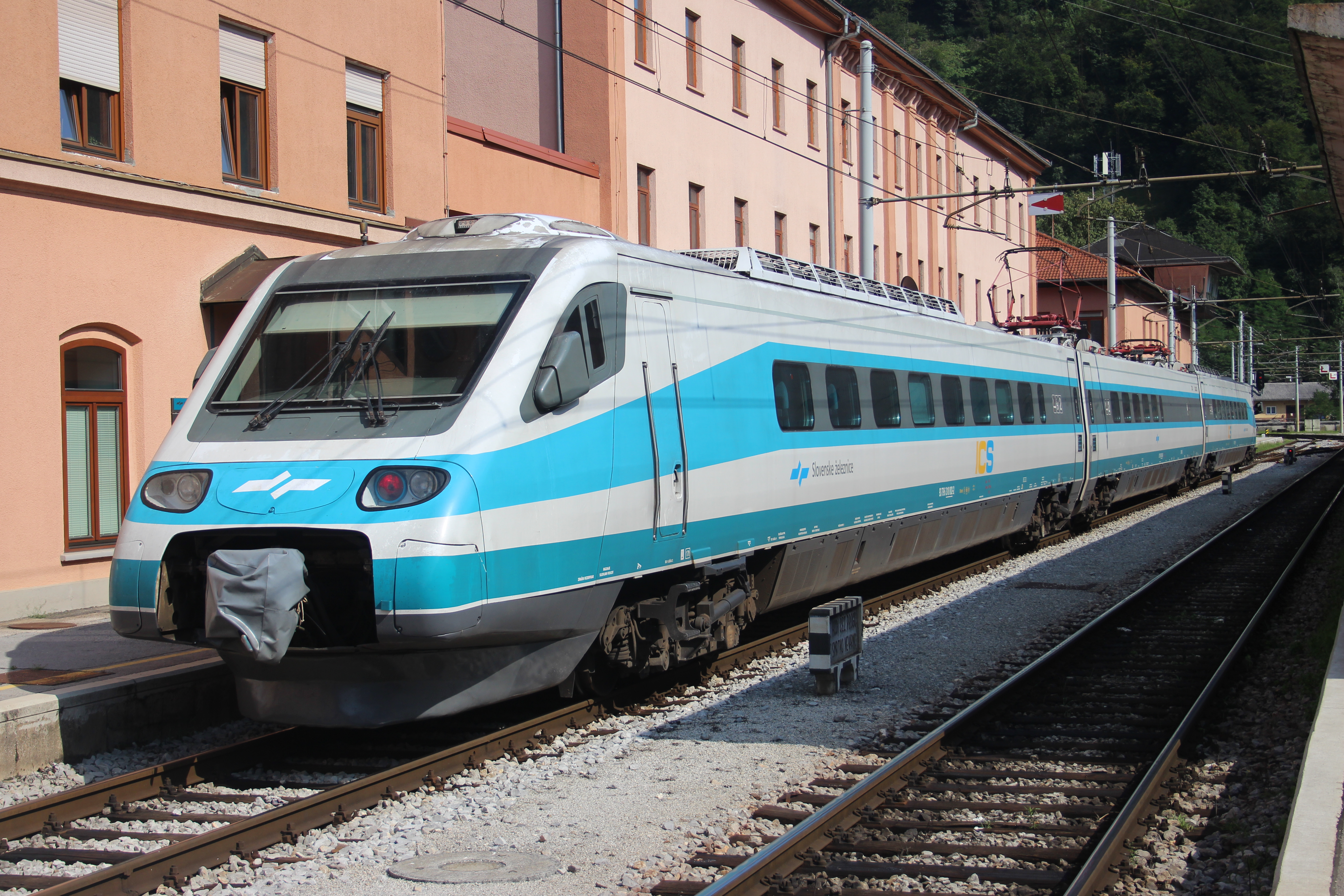
- SŽ 310 unit at Zidani Most, Slovenia.
- Manufacturers: Fiat Ferroviaria (now Alstom)
- Built at: Savigliano, Torino, Italy
- Family name: Pendolino
- Constructed: 2000
- Entered service: 2000
- Number built: Three 3-car sets
- Formation: MU 310 + COACH 316 + MU 310; Wheel arrangement: (1Ao)(Ao1)+ 2'2'+ (1Ao)(Ao1)
- Fleet numbers: 310 001 + 316 001 + 310 004; 310 002 + 316 002 + 310 005; 310 003 + 316 003 + 310 006 .
- Capacity: 164 + 2 additional (inv.): 30 (1st class); 134 + 2 (inv.) (2nd class)
- Operator: Slovenske železnice
- Line served: Ljubljana - Zidani Most - Celje - Pragersko - Maribor

Specifications
- Train length: 81.2 m (266 ft 4 7/8 in)
- Car length: MU 310 : 27.2 m (89 ft 2 7/8 in); COACH 316 : 25 m (82 ft 1/4 in)
- Width: 2,800 mm (9 ft 2 1/4 in)
- Height: 3,730 mm (12 ft 2 7/8 in)
- Maximum speed: 200 km/h (120 mph) Rolling stock maximum, 160 km/h (99 mph) Operated
- Weight: 171.0 t (377,000 lb)
- Power output: 1,960 kW (2,630 hp)
- Electric system: 3,000 V DC overhead
- Current collection: Pantograph
- Braking systems: Pneum. SAB - WABCO; EP; ED; MG(3x); man.(3x)
- Coupling system: Dellner
- Track gauge: 1,435 mm (4 ft 8 1/2 in) standard gauge

SŽ series 310 is a high-speed tilting EMU used on the InterCitySlovenija premium train service in Slovenia, operated by Slovenske železnice since September 24, 2000. It is based on the Italian ETR 460 commonly known as Pendolino. The train is capable of reaching a maximum speed of 200 km/h, and uses 3 kV DC overhead wire.

InterCitySlovenija links the major cities of Slovenia in one line: Ljubljana, Celje and Maribor, with frequent service that acts as a high-speed shuttle. Tilting trains can reach a maximum speed of 160 km/h on the sections Maribor - Pragersko, Pragersko - Slovenska Bistrica and Grobelno - Sentjur. The train is made up of three cars: two 2nd class cars and one 1st class car. The trains provide disabled access, as well as an onboard Wi-Fi and a snack bar.

Slovenske železnice bought in the year 2000 three trainsets, which currently operate on the Ljubljana - Maribor route.

One SŽ series 310 trainset was also used on international services, connecting Venice Santa Lucia to Ljubljana as Eurocity 50/51 Casanova from December 14, 2003, to April 1, 2008. From December 12, 2004, to December 10, 2005, this service was extended to Maribor, with Intercity connections from and to Graz in Austria.

== Technical specifications ==
General characteristics
Manufacturer	Fiat Ferroviaria, Italy
Year of manufacture	2000
Trainset Formation	Motor car MU310 + intermediate coach 316 + Motor car MU310
Wheel arrangement	(1Ao)(Ao1) + 2′2′ + (1Ao)(Ao1)
Crew	One driver
Performance
Voltage	3 kV DC
Total power output	2,000 kW
Maximum speed	200 km/h
Maximum speed when hauled by a locomotive	80 km/h
Tilting system	Hydraulic, maximum tilt of 8°
Dimensions
Total length	81.2 m
Motor car length	27.2 m
Intermediate coach length	25.0 m
Width	2,800 mm
Height	3,730 mm
Wheel diameter	890 mm
Minimum curve radius	250 m in service; 110 m in workshops
Weight
Empty weight	152 t
Service weight	164 t
Empty weight per motor car	51 t
Empty weight of intermediate coach	50 t
Maximum axle load	14.0 t, motor cars; 13.3 t, intermediate coach
Linear load	2.0 t/m
Electrical equipment
Auxiliary power supply	380 V, 50 Hz
Battery voltage	72 V DC
Auxiliary lighting	24 V DC
Heating power	108 kW
Braking and safety systems
Braking systems	SAB-WABCO pneumatic, electro-pneumatic, electrodynamic, magnetic track and manual brakes
Braking mass, pneumatic and electromagnetic brakes	351 t
Braking mass, pneumatic brakes	284 t
Braking mass, manual brakes	48 t
Braking percentage, pneumatic and electromagnetic brakes	214%
Braking percentage, pneumatic brakes	173%
Vigilance device	Parizzi
Speedometer	Deuta
Train protection system	Indusi I 60 R
Radio	AEG
Passenger accommodation
First-class seats	30
Second-class seats	134
Wheelchair spaces	2
Total capacity	164 seats and 2 wheelchair spaces
Onboard facilities	Air conditioning, bar and telephone

Source: Slovenske železnice Group.
