= Slovenian Railways =

State railway company of Slovenia

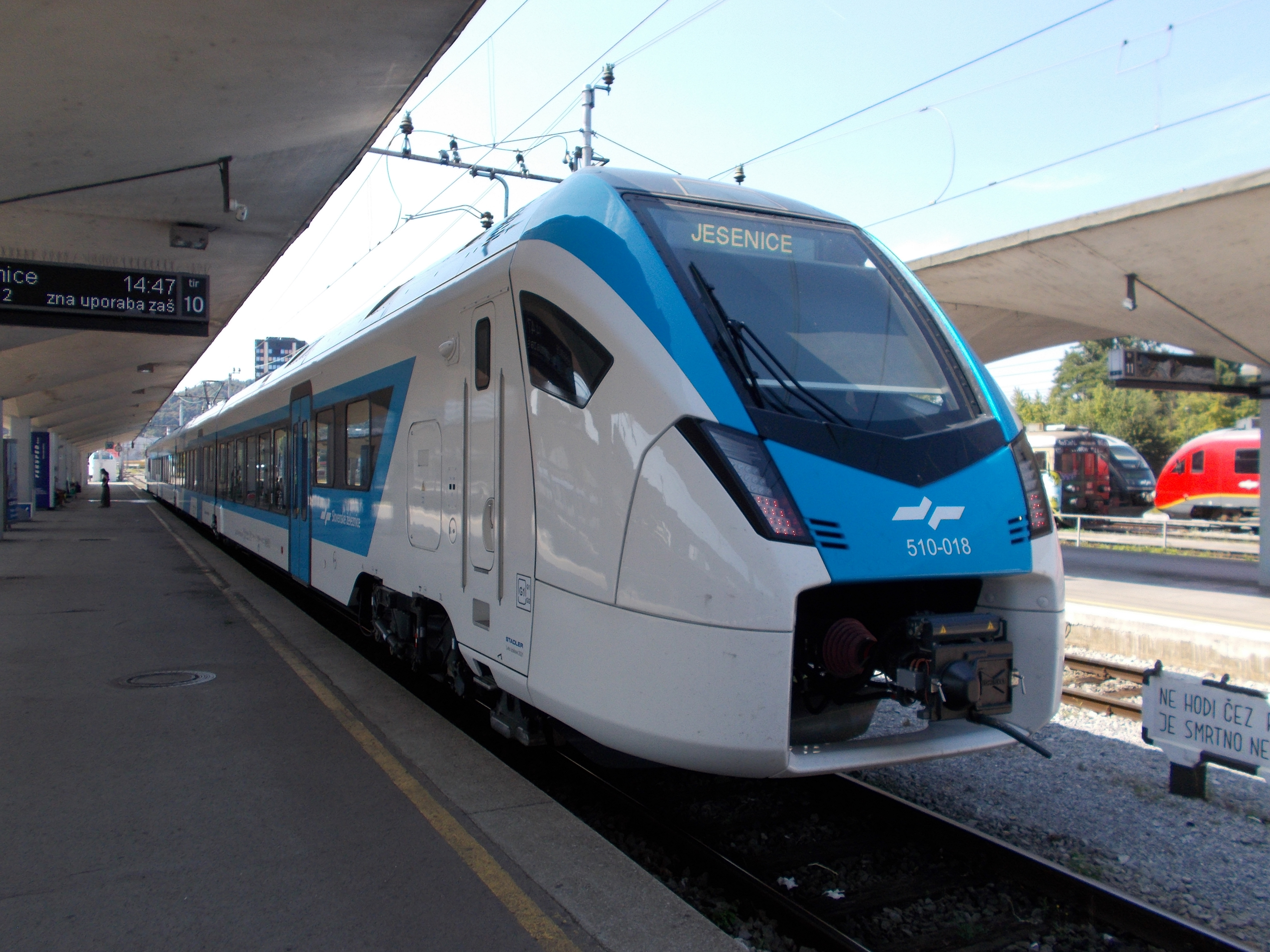

Operation
- National railway: Slovenske železnice d.o.o.

Statistics
- Ridership: 13.42 million (2017)
- Passenger-distance: 650 million km (2017)
- Freight: 4.4 billion tonne-km (2017)

System length
- Total: 1,209 kilometres (751 mi)
- Double track: 331 km (206 mi)
- Electrified: 610 km (380 mi)

Track gauge
- Main: 1,435 mm (4 ft 8 1/2 in) standard gauge
- High-speed: 1,435 mm (4 ft 8 1/2 in)

Features
Map
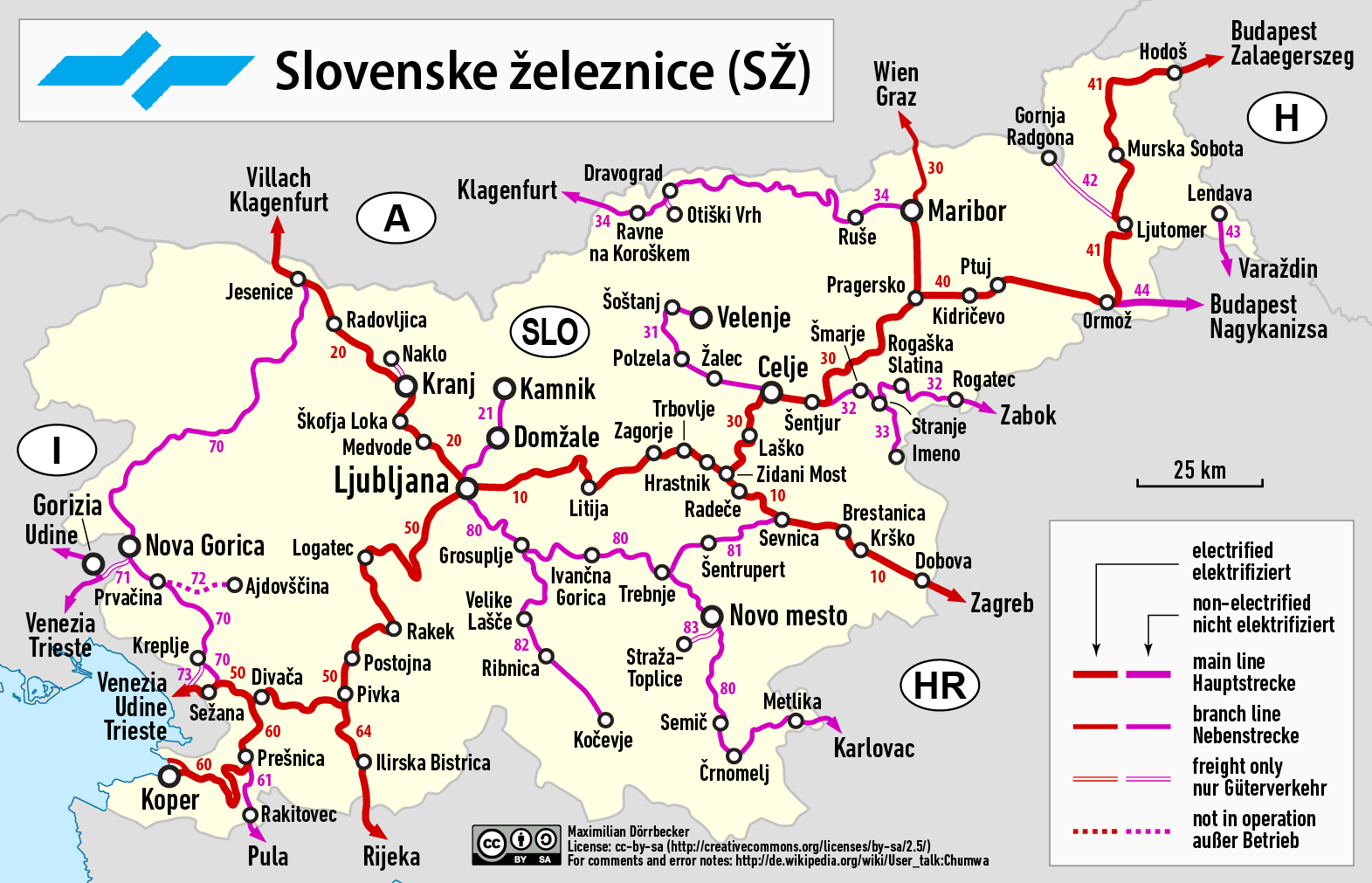

Slovenian Railways (Slovene: Slovenske železnice d.o.o., SŽ) is the state railway company of Slovenia, created in 1991.

Slovenia is a member of the International Union of Railways (UIC). The UIC Country Code for Slovenia is 79.

== History ==
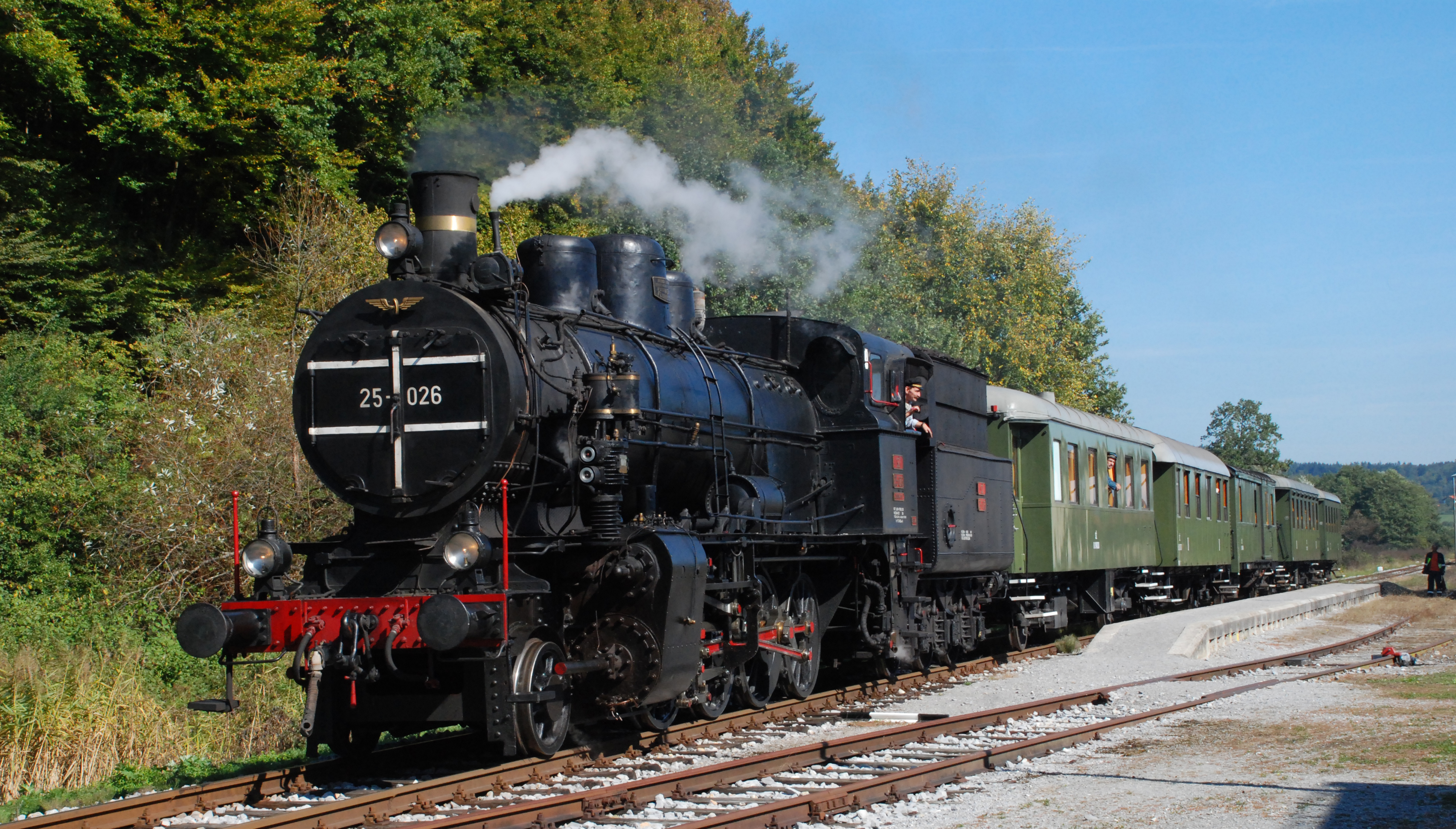
Steam locomotive SŽ 25-026, manufactured in 1920 in Vienna, used by Slovenske železnice for tourism

What is now Slovenia received its first railway connection in the 1840s, when the Austrian Empire built a railway connection – Südliche Staatsbahn or Austrian Southern Railway – between its capital, Vienna, and its major commercial port, Trieste. Thus, Maribor was connected by railway to Graz in 1844. The stretch was extended via Pragersko to Celje in 1846, and further via Zidani Most to Ljubljana in 1849. A double-track line was continued via Postojna, Pivka, and Divača, finally reaching Trieste in 1857.

Before World War I, numerous other railways were built. In 1860, Pragersko was connected to Ormož and further to Čakovec, Croatia, thus connecting the Austrian and the Hungarian parts of the empire. In 1862, a single-track railway (expanded into double-track in 1944) along the Sava river was built, connecting Zidani Most with Zagreb. In 1863, the "Carinthian railway" was built along the Drava river, connecting Maribor with Dravograd, Klagenfurt and Villach. In 1870, a railway along the upper Sava river valley was built, connecting Ljubljana with Kranj, Jesenice and Tarvisio, Italy. In 1873, a line from Pivka via Illirska Bistrica connected Rijeka, then the most important commercial port in the Hungarian part of the empire. In 1876, a line from Divača connected Pula, the Austrian naval base, via Prešnica. In 1906, Bohinj Railway was built, connecting Villach with Jesenice, along the Soča river valley to Gorizia and further to Trieste, with two over 6000 meter tunnels.

Few lines were opened after World War I. One of them connected Ormož with Ljutomer and Murska Sobota, and opened in 1924. After World War II, a single-track electrified line connecting Prešnica with Koper was built in 1967.

Slovenian Railways (Slovene: Slovenske železnice, SŽ), the state railway company of Slovenia, was created in 1991 from the Ljubljana division of the former Yugoslav Railways after the breakup of Yugoslavia.

In 1999, a single-track line between Murska Sobota and Hodoš was rebuilt, offering a direct connection with the Hungarian railway system. The line was originally built in 1907 and closed down in 1968, among numerous other lines closed down during the 1960s. In April 2016 the electrification of the Pragersko - Hodoš line was completed.

Numerous ex-Yugoslav Railways steam locomotives are plinthed at stations around Slovenia and there is a railway museum at Ljubljana.

== Rolling stock ==
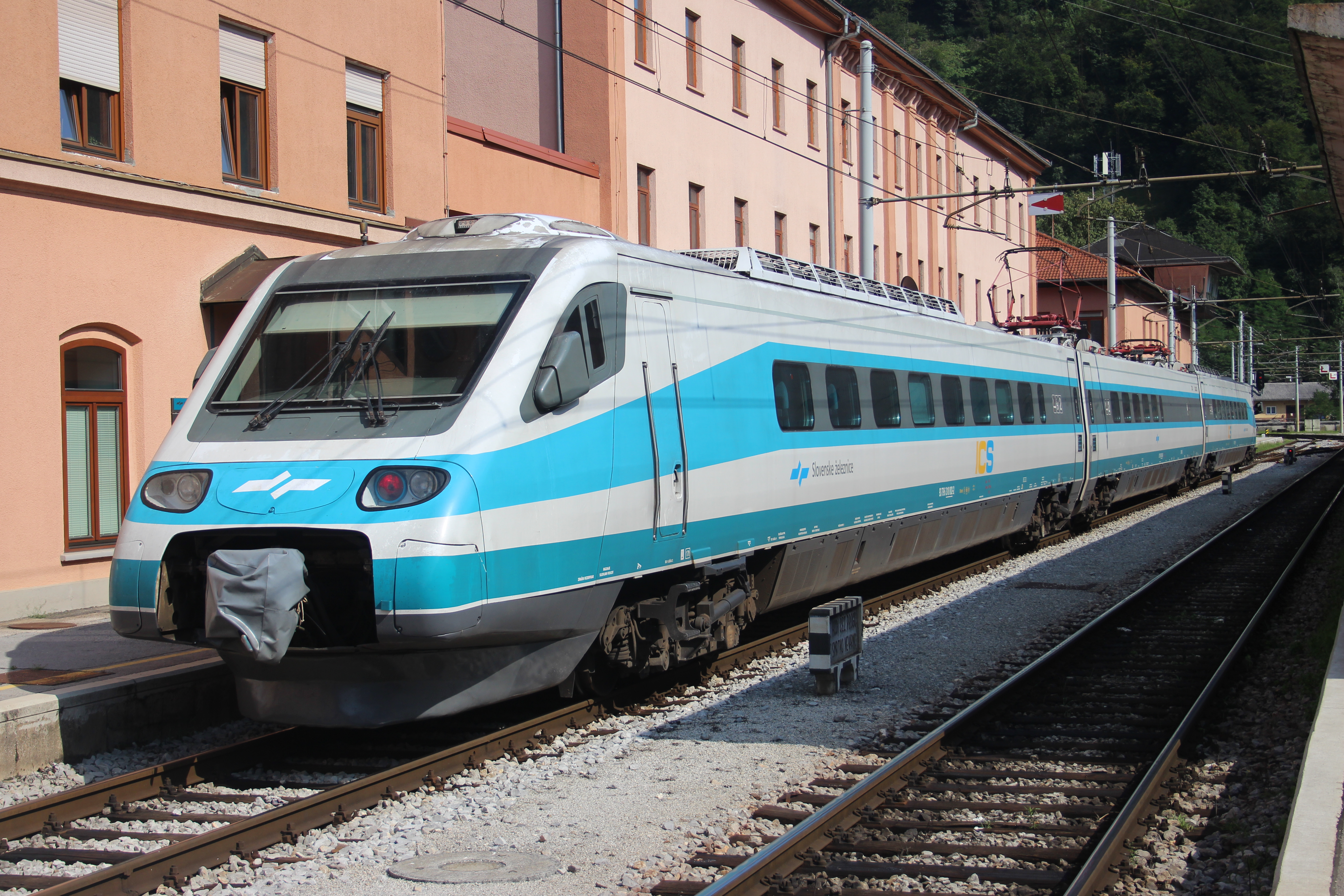
SŽ series 310

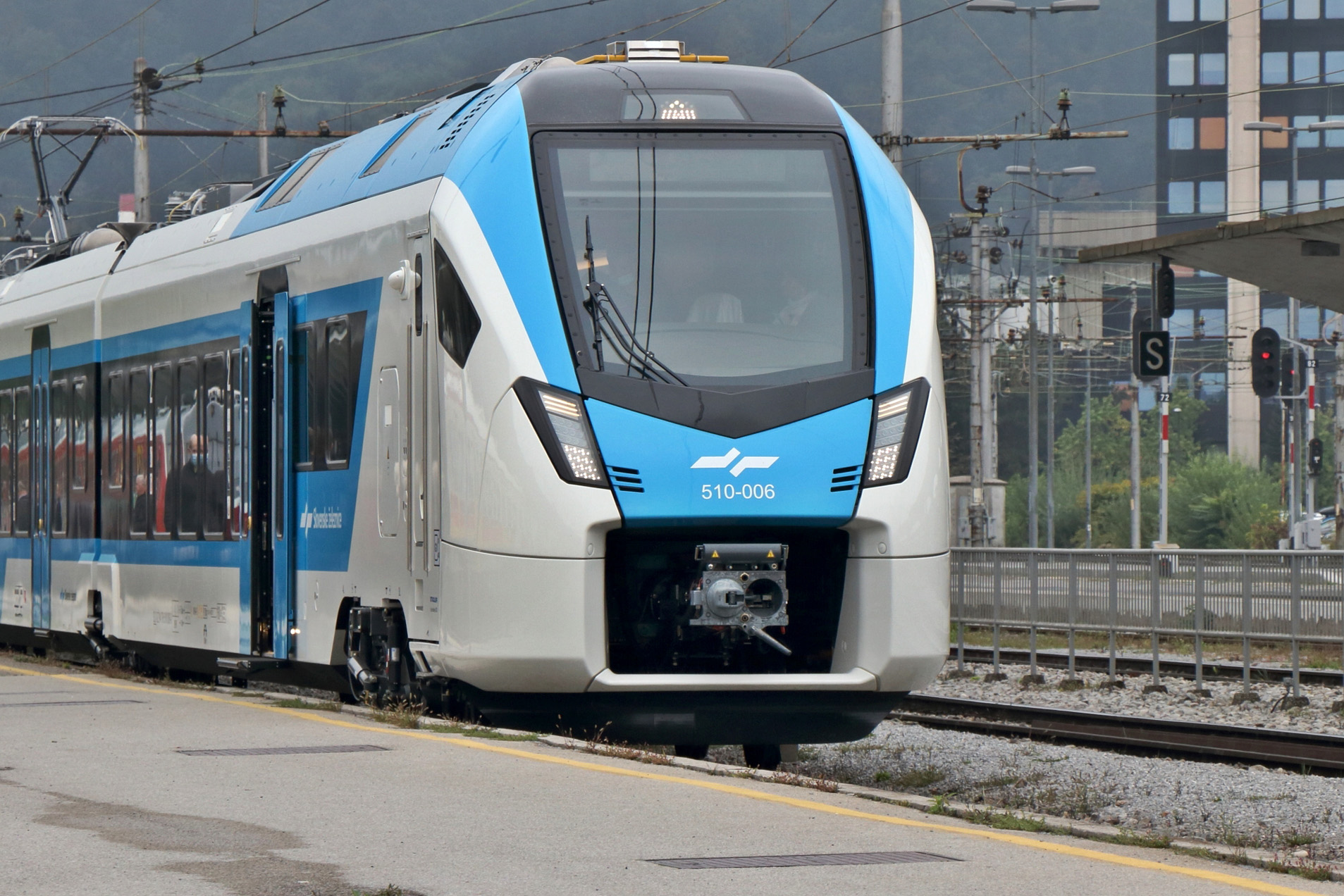
SŽ series 510

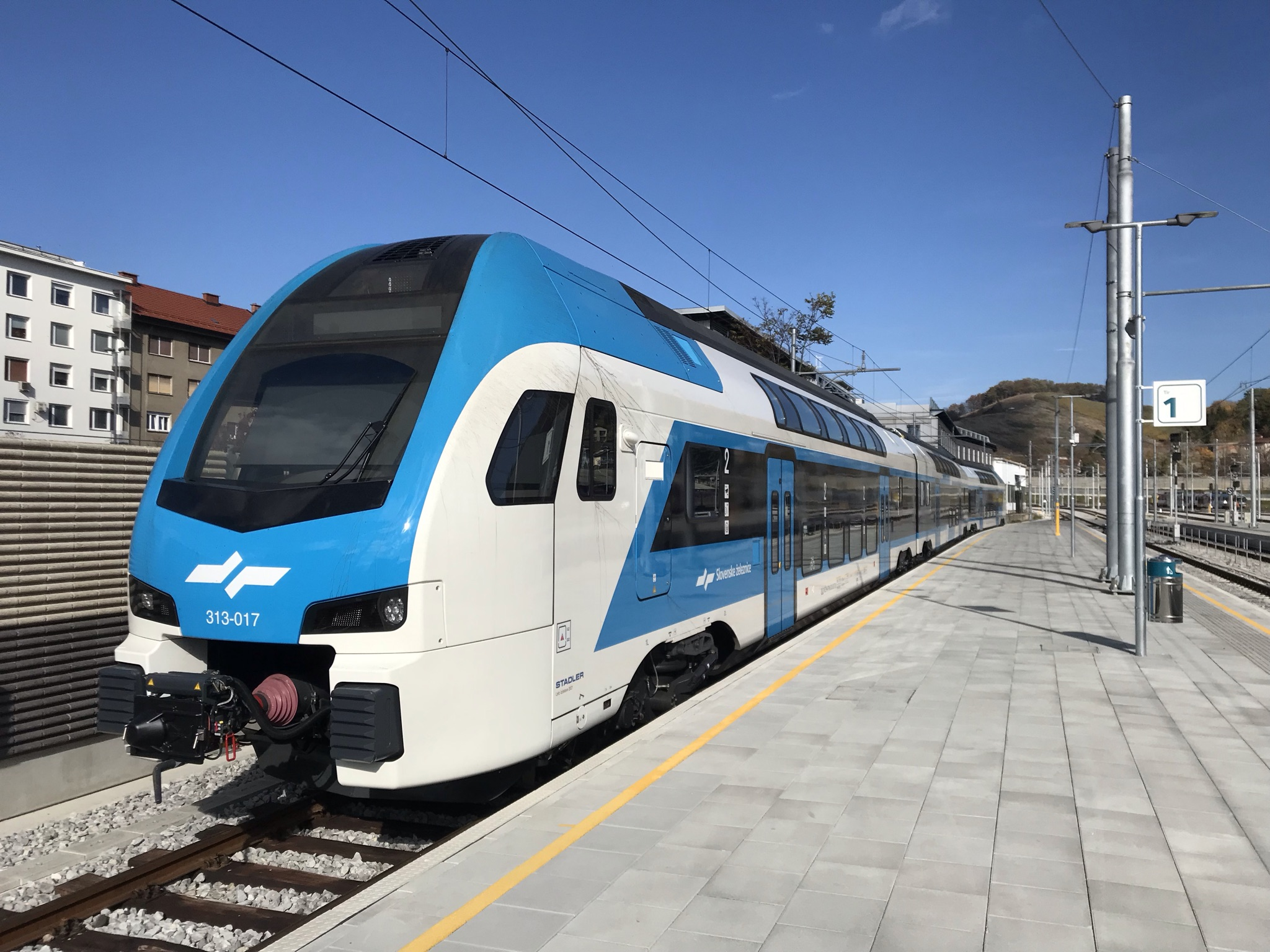
SŽ series 313

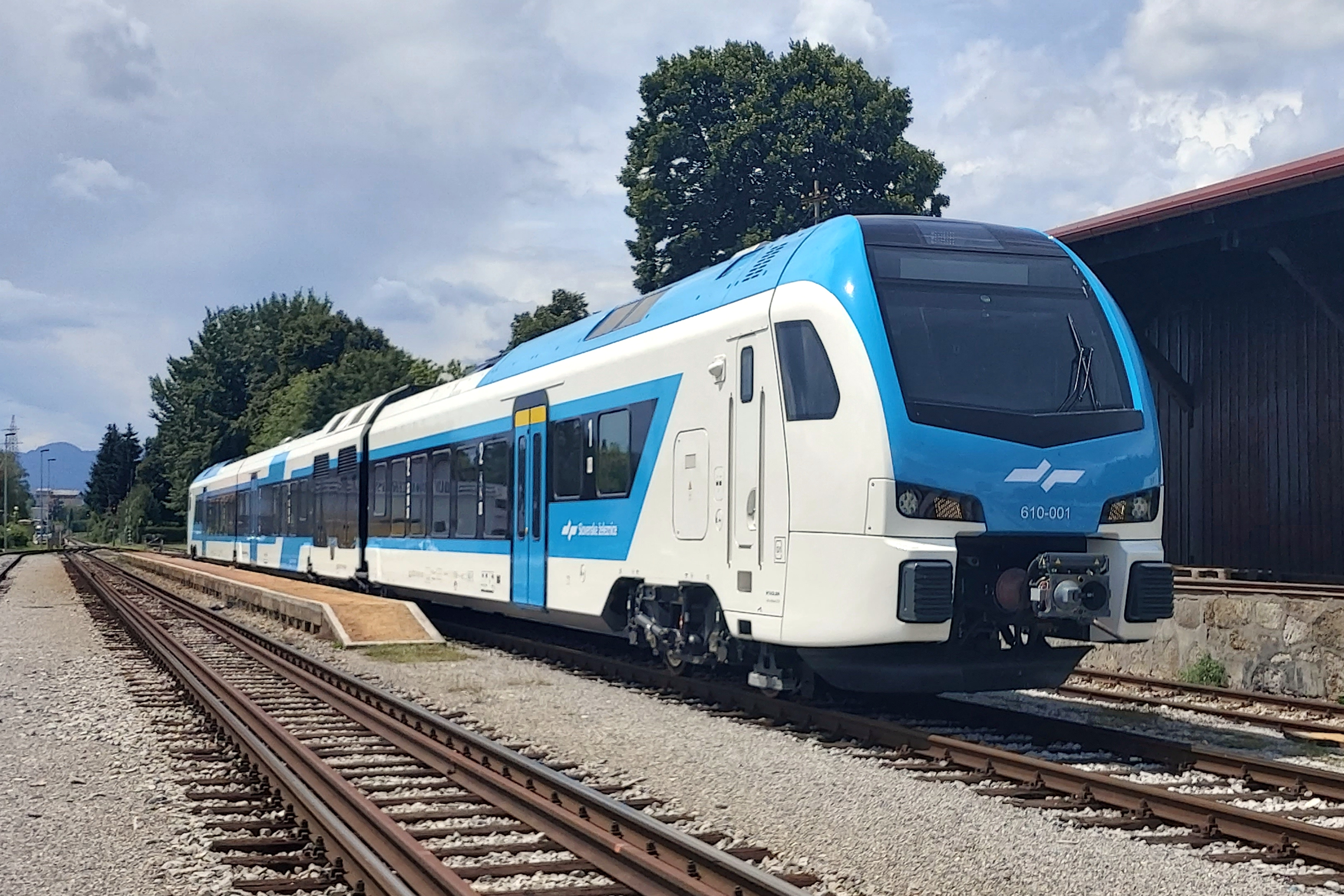
Stadler FLIRT DMU (SŽ 610/615)

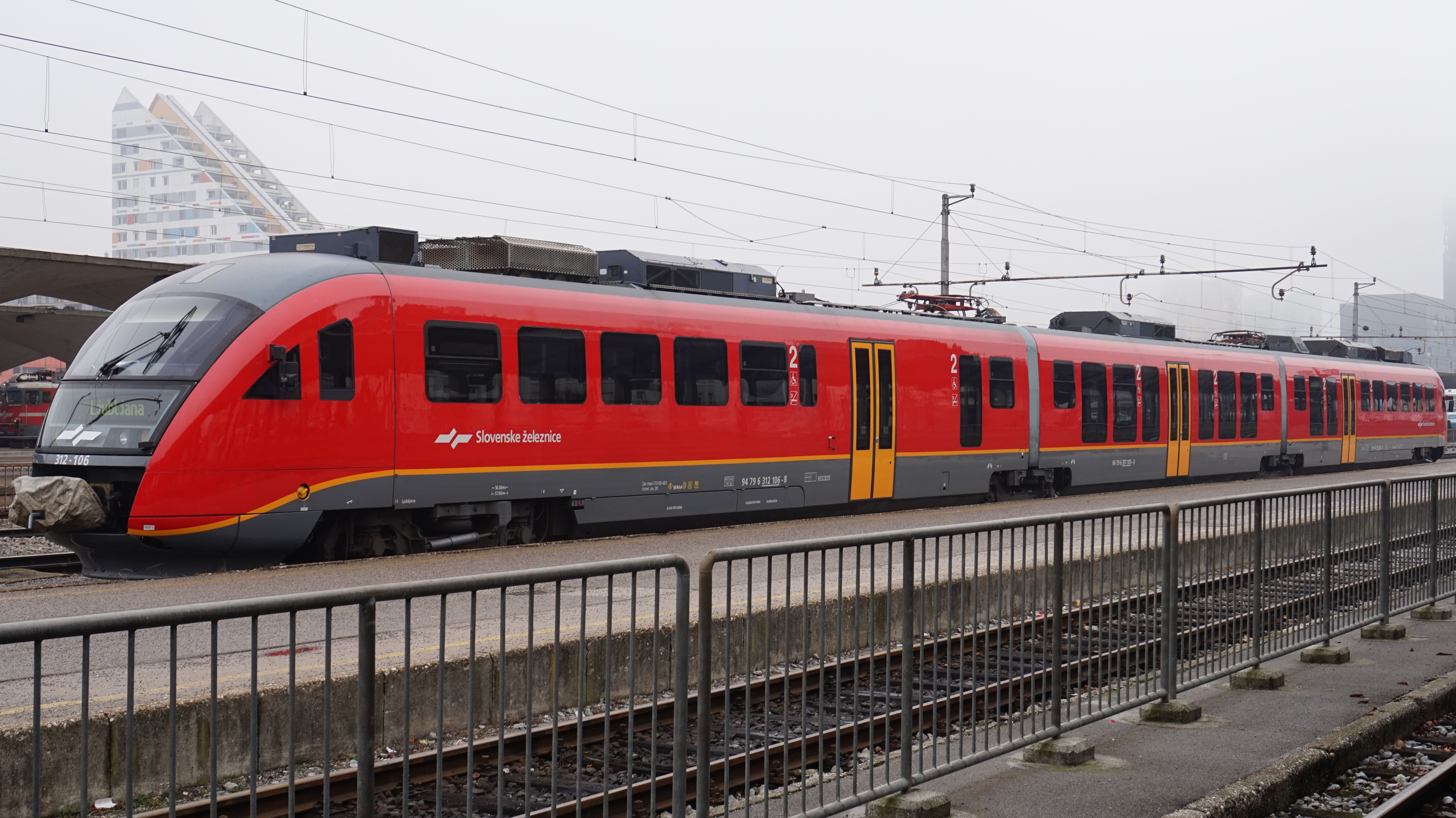
Siemens Desiro (SŽ 312/317)

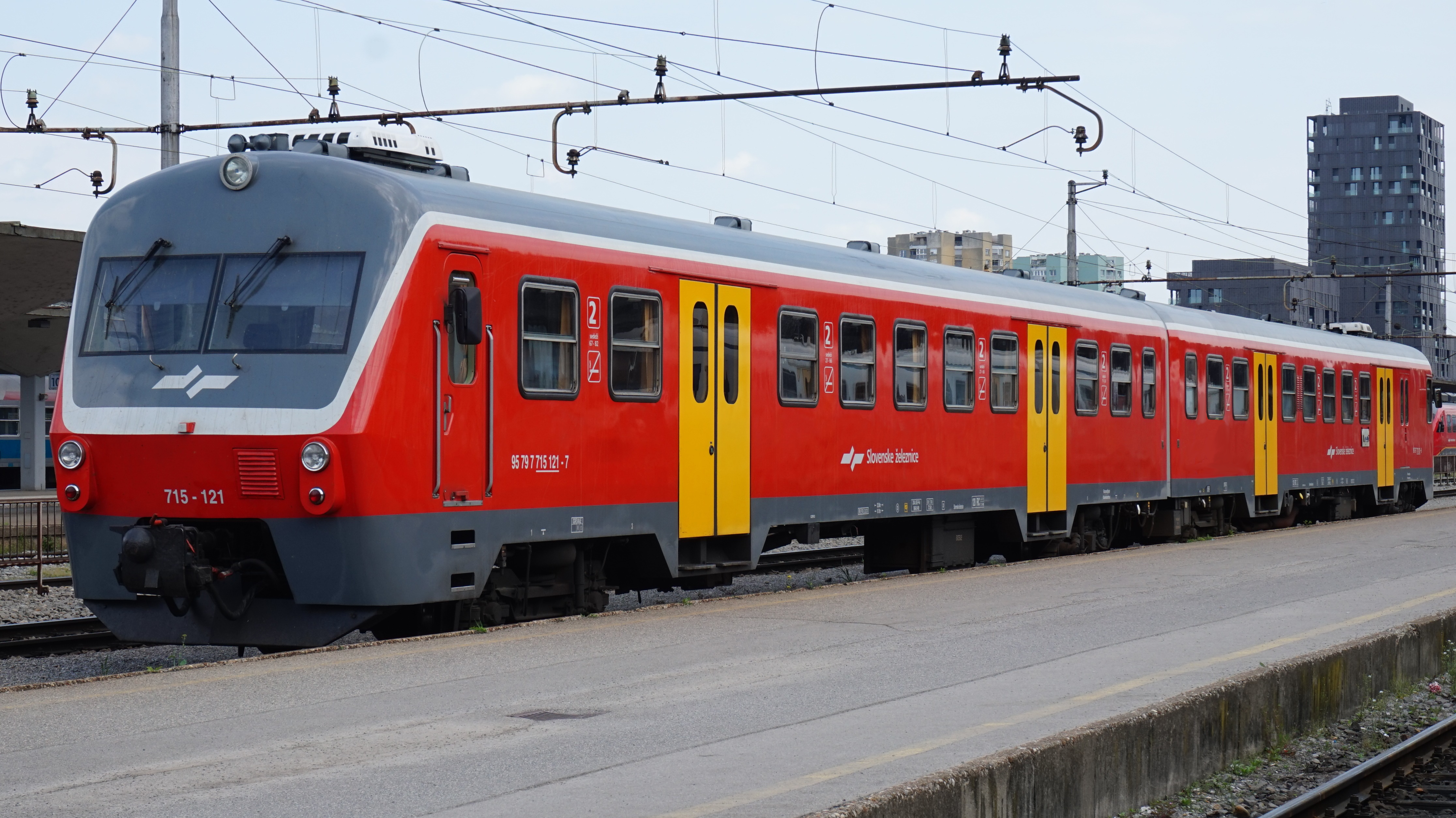
SŽ 713/715

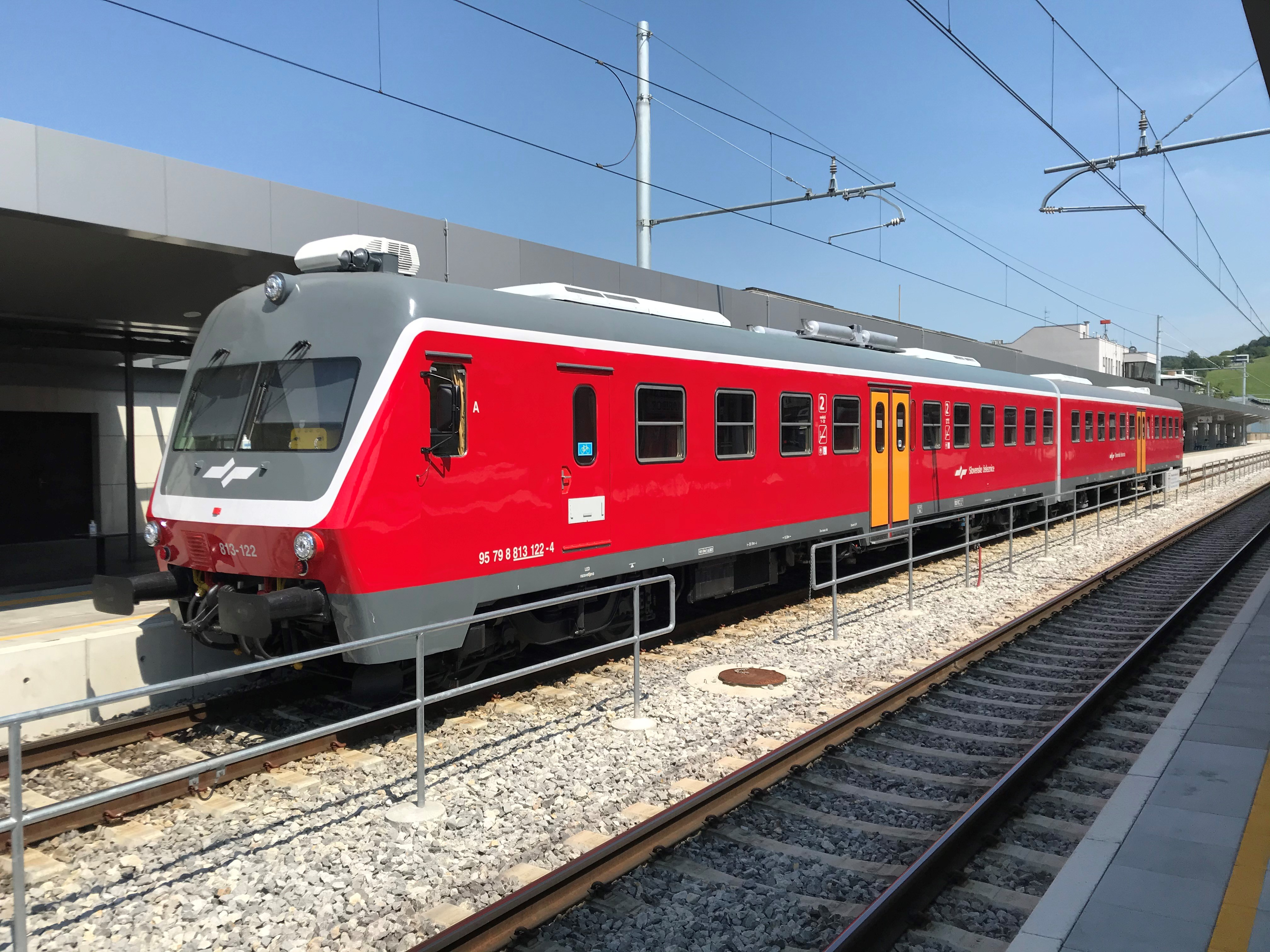
SŽ 813/814

== System ==
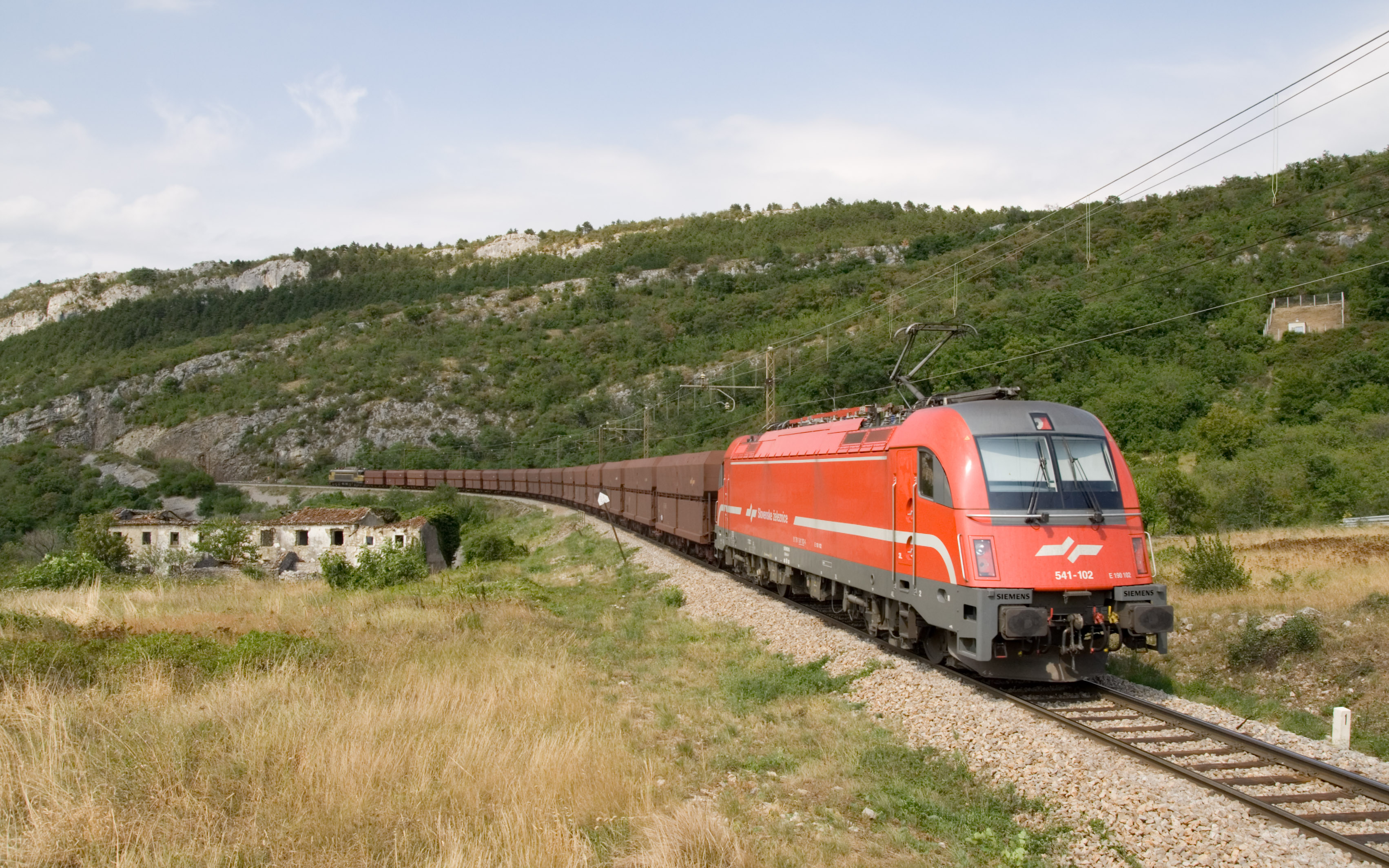
Freight train SŽ 541-102

Slovenian Railways operates 1,229 km of standard gauge tracks, 331 km as double track, and reaches all regions of the country. Slovenia is well connected by rail to all surrounding countries, reflecting the fact that it used to be part of the Austro-Hungarian Empire and later part of Yugoslavia. Left-hand running is used on double-track sections, unlike the remainder of the former Yugoslavian railways.

Electrification is provided by a 3 kV DC system and covers 610 km, with electrification from Pragersko to Hodoš on the Corridor V completed in April 2016. The remainder of the former Yugoslavian railways that have been electrified operate with the 25 kV AC system, so trains to Zagreb have to change engines at Dobova in the absence of dual voltage engines. The DC system was inherited from the Italian Ferrovie dello Stato on the Sežana-Pivka-Postojna and Pivka-Ilirska Bistrica-Šapjane lines, which were electrified in 1936; starting in 1962, further electrification was conducted with the same system, to preserve compatibility. This also necessitated different rolling stock compared to the rest of Yugoslavia: after World War II, the newly formed Slovenian division of Yugoslav Railways received 17 FS Class E.626 locomotives as war reparations for operation on the formerly Italian-owned lines, with newly produced electrical traction vehicles coming in 1962 after electrification was extended from Postojna to Ljubljana (JŽ class 362), 1964 (JŽ class 311), 1967 (JŽ Class 342) and 1975-1977 (JŽ class 363). Due to the Croatian sector of the national railways (as well as the sectors of the other republics of Yugoslavia) choosing the more modern 25 kV system, a voltage break was created in Dobova, which necessitates locomotive switching. Another voltage break arose in Croatia in Šapjane in 2012 after Croatia switched their own 3 kV network that ran around Rijeka to the 25 kV standard.

== Rail links to adjacent countries ==
- Same gauge
  - Austria — voltage change to 15 kV AC
  - Croatia — voltage change to 25 kV 50 Hz AC
  - Hungary — voltage change to 25 kV 50 Hz AC
  - Italy — same voltage 3 kV DC

== Crossroad of Pan-European corridors ==
Ljubljana is at the heart of the SŽ system. Here, the Pan-European corridors V and X intersect. These transportation corridors are being established to tie larger segments of Europe economically together: Corridor V links Venice - Trieste/Koper - Ljubljana - Maribor - Budapest - Kyiv, while Corridor X connects Salzburg - Ljubljana - Zagreb - Belgrade - Skopje - Thessalonica. The freight system to Koper, a modern and growing port near Trieste, represents the shortest connection to the Mediterranean for a large portion of the hinterland of Central and Eastern Europe.

In 2010, Slovenske Železnice joined Cargo 10, a joint venture with other railways in the region.

== Passenger trains ==
=== InterCity Slovenija (ICS) ===
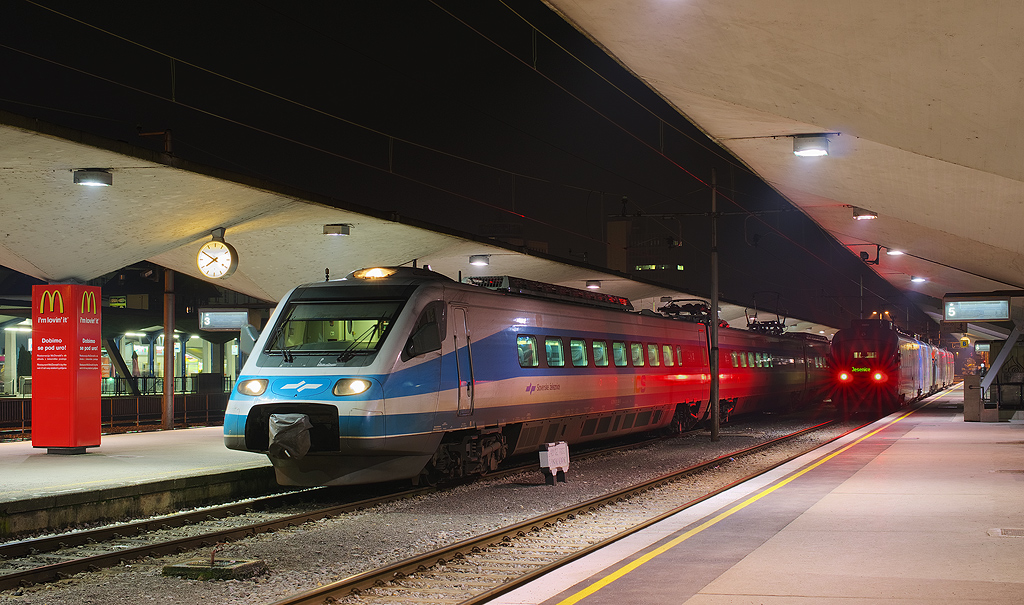
ICS Pendolino ETR-310 serving as fast train between Ljubljana and Maribor.

The ICS trains are modern, air-conditioned high-speed trains which provide the highest level comfort and reach speeds up to 160 km/h. They are equipped with disabled access and other facilities. The passengers can buy food on board (from Monday to Friday), the 1st class passengers are offered a drink free of charge. There are also electric sockets in the 1st class compartment. The train is a tilting EMU. The reservation of a seat is obligatory and is included in the price of the ticket. Also included in the price of the ticket is the obligatory ICS supplement.

The ICS trains run on the line between Maribor and Ljubljana and stop at:

- Maribor
  - connection to Holmec and onwards to Austria
- Pragersko
  - connection to Središče
  - connection to Hodoš and onwards to Hungary
- Celje
  - connection to Velenje
  - connection to Sveti Rok ob Sotli
  - connection to Imeno
- Zidani Most
  - connection to Dobova and onwards to Croatia
- Ljubljana
  - connection to Rosalnice and onwards to Croatia
  - connection to Jesenice and onwards to Austria
  - connection to Kamnik Graben
  - connection to Kočevje

In the past ICS trains occasionally also ran on the line from Ljubljana to Koper and stopped at:

- Pivka
  - connection to Ilirska Bistrica and onwards to Croatia
- Divača
  - connection to Sežana
- Hrpelje-Kozina
  - connection to Rakitovec and onwards to Croatia
- Koper

=== InterCity (IC) ===
The IC trains are quality trains serving longer distances in national and international traffic. They connect bigger towns, cities and tourist resorts. They consist of comfortable cars. They provide fast connection and call only at major stations. The train usually consists of open or compartment coaches (1st and 2nd class). Some of the trains may have a restaurant car. An IC supplement must be paid for this type of train.

=== EuroCity (EC) ===
The EC trains are high-quality trains serving important lines in international traffic. They connect important cities in Slovenia and the rest of Europe. The EC trains are even faster than the IC trains and they call at fewer stations. The majority of the EC trains include air-conditioned cars and have catering facilities on board. The train usually consists of open and compartment passenger coaches (1st and 2nd class). Some of the trains may have a restaurant car. An EC supplement must be paid for this type of train.

=== International trains (MV) ===
The MV trains (Slovene for mednarodni vlak, international train) are quality trains serving international lines. They do not call at minor stations. The train usually consists of open and compartment passenger coaches (1st and 2nd class). Some of the trains may have a restaurant car. An MV supplement must be paid for this type of train.

=== EuroNight (EN) ===
The EN trains are high-quality overnight international trains. They offer open or compartment passenger coaches (1st and 2nd class), couchette cars and sleeping cars. Some of the trains may have a restaurant car. The EC supplement must be paid for regular seats and an additional supplement must be paid for couchettes and sleeper cars. Some EN trains use "global" prices with an obligatory reservation.

=== Regional (RG) and local trains (LP) ===
The RG and LP (Slovene for lokalni potniški, local passenger train) trains are other trains, connecting all parts of Slovenia. They serve as commuter trains. On some lines, they are the only type of trains available, for example lines to Kamnik and Imeno. The trains offer 2nd class and the new Stadler trains also offer 1st class. They are usually EMUs and DMUs on unelectrified lines.

=== Supplements ===
In addition to the supplements for faster trains, there is also one for tickets bought on the train instead of beforehand. It is set at €5.00, and no discount is available for children, the elderly, groups, and so on.

=== Named trains ===
Many trains are assigned names. The examples include:

- IC 502 / 503 "Pohorje"
- IC 508 / 509 "Dana"
- IC 518 / 519 "Ptuj"
- IC 516 / 517 "Mura"
- EC 150 / 151 "Emona"
- EC 158 / 159 "Croatia"
- EC 210 / 211 "Sava"
- EC 212 / 213 "Mimara"
- EN 414 / 415 "Alpine Pearls"
- EN 498 / 499 "Lisinski"
- MV 246 / 247 "Citadella"
- MV 480 / 481 "Opatija"
- MV 482 / 483 "Ljubljana"
- MV 1246 / 1247 "Retro Istria"
- RG 600 / 601 "Soča"

=== Former named trains ===
A noted train of the SŽ was the Casanova linking Ljubljana to Venice in a 4-hour ride, eliminated in April 2007. Last train connection with Italy, night train EN 440 / 441 "Venezia" from Budapest to Venice was eliminated in December 2011.

== Railway operators ==
Besides Slovenia's national railway operator, Adria Transport, Slovenia's first open-access operator dedicated to freight transport, also operates in the nation's network.

== See also ==
- Slovenian Railway Museum
- Railway lines in Slovenia
- Spielfeld-Straß–Trieste railway - This line connects Slovenia and Italy
- List of steam locomotives in Slovenia
- Transport in Slovenia
- Narrow gauge railways in Slovenia
