= Divača–Koper Railway =

Railway line in Slovenia

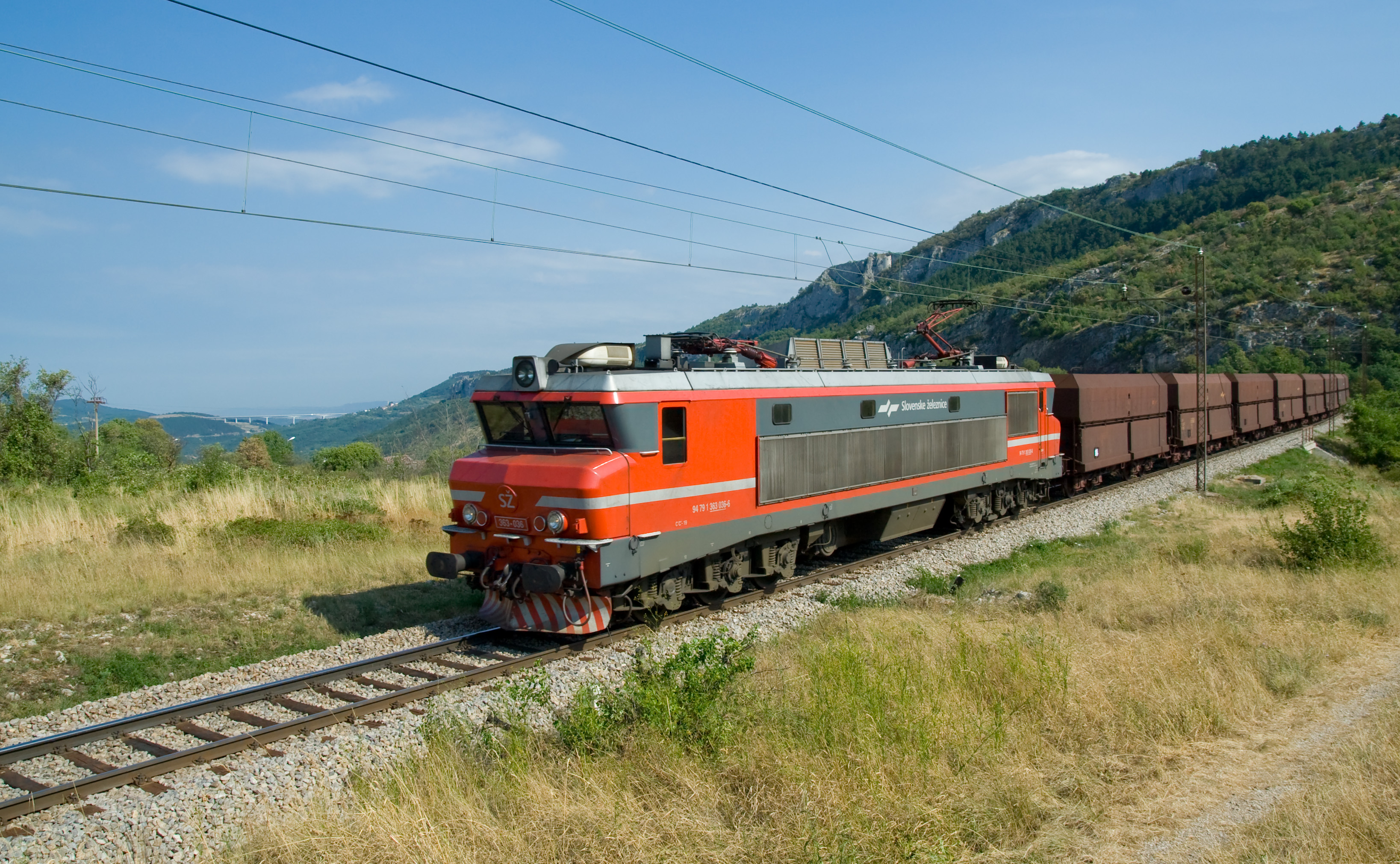
- Class 363 hauled train between Črnotiče and Hrastovlje

Overview
- Status: Operational
- Locale: Slovenia
- Termini: Divača; Koper
- Stations: 7

Service
- System: Slovenske železnice
- Operator(s): SZ

History
- Opened: 1968

Technical
- Line length: 49 km (30 mi)
- Number of tracks: Single track
- Track gauge: 1,435 mm (4 ft 8 1/2 in) standard gauge
- Electrification: Electrified at 3000 V DC

The Divača–Koper Railway (Slovene: Železniška proga Divača–Koper) is a Slovenian 50-kilometre long railway line that connects Ljubljana and Divača with the coastal town of Koper.

== Usage ==
The line is used by the following passenger services:

- Intercity: Maribor–Pragersko–Celje–Ljubljana–Borovnica–Postojna–Divača–Hrpelje-Kozina–Koper
- Intercity: Ljubljana–Borovnica–Postojna–Divača–Hrpelje-Kozina–Koper
- Regionalni vlak (Regional train): Ljubljana–Borovnica–Postojna–Divača–Rodik–Hrpelje-Kozina–Presnica–Koper
- Regionalni vlak (Regional train): (Sežana–) Divača–Rodik–Hrpelje-Kozina–Presnica–Črnotiče–Hrastovlje–Koper
- Regionalni vlak (Regional train): Divača–Rodik–Hrpelje-Kozina–Presnica–Podgorje–Zazid–Rakitovec

There are also many freight trains operating along this line to the port in Koper.

== Track upgrade ==
A new shorter track alignment between Koper and Divača with several tunnels reducing the length from 44 km (27 mi) to 27 km (17 mi) is under construction and slated to open in 2026.

== Gallery ==
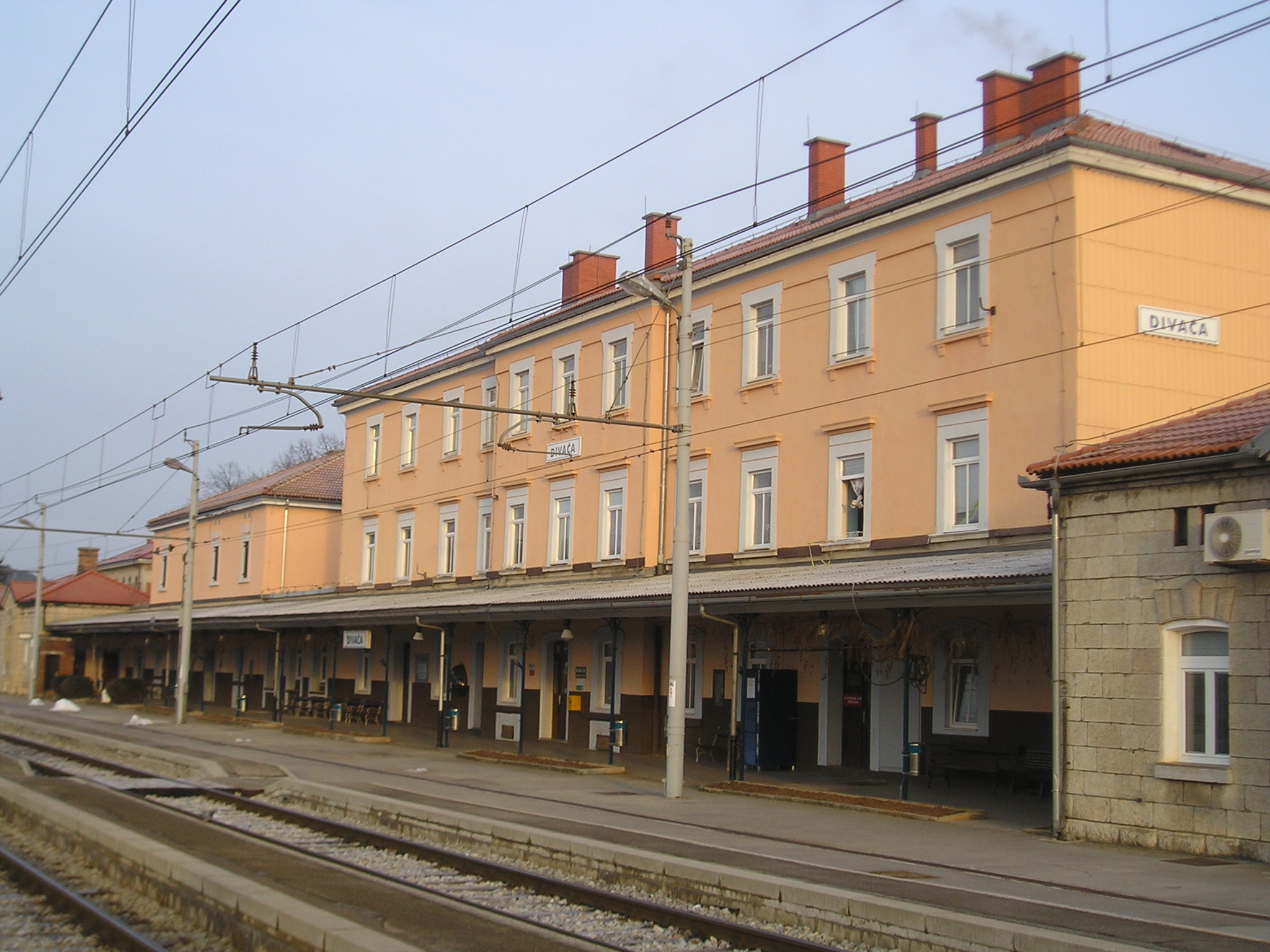
Divača railway station in 2010

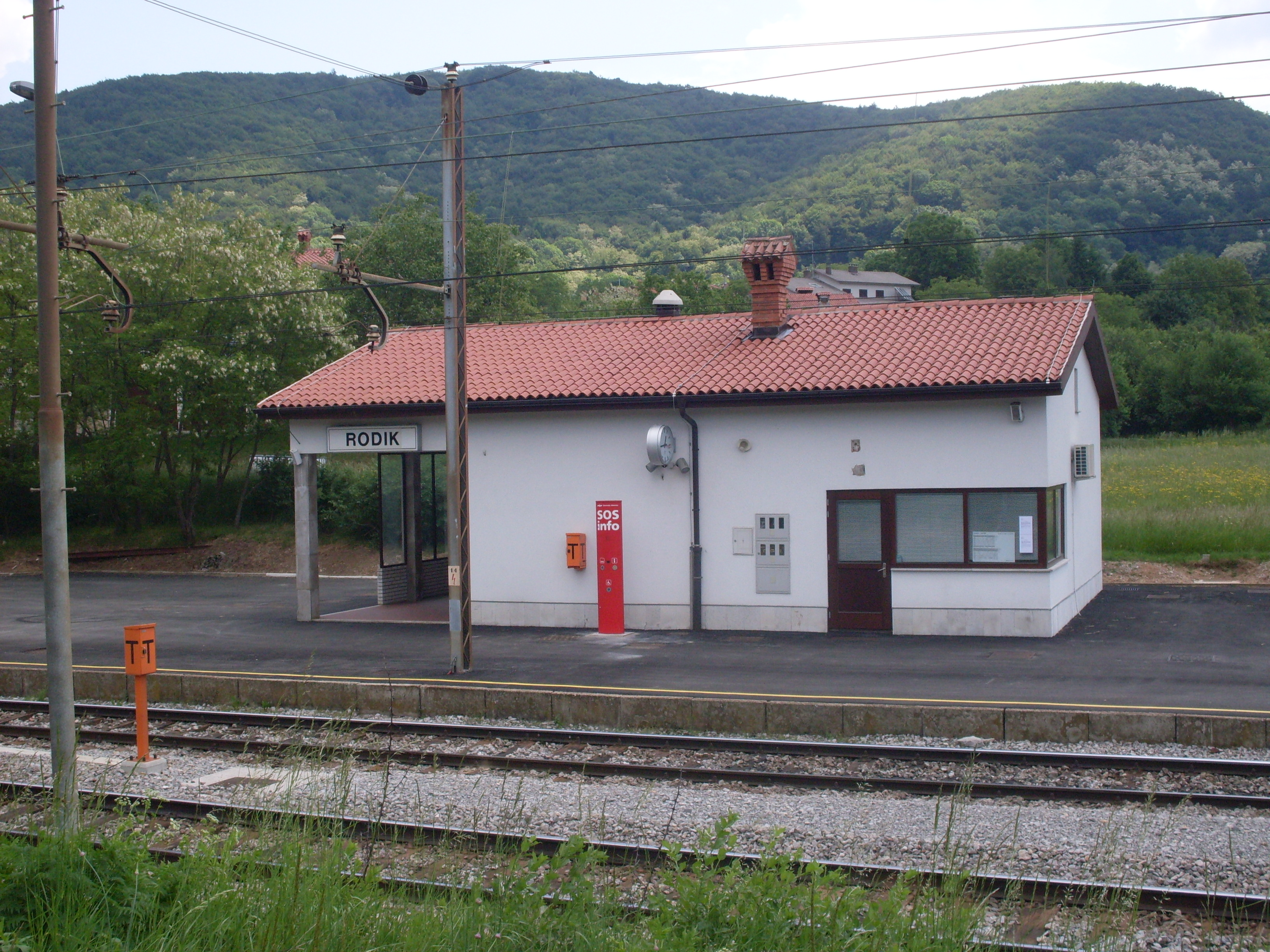
Rodik railway station in 2011

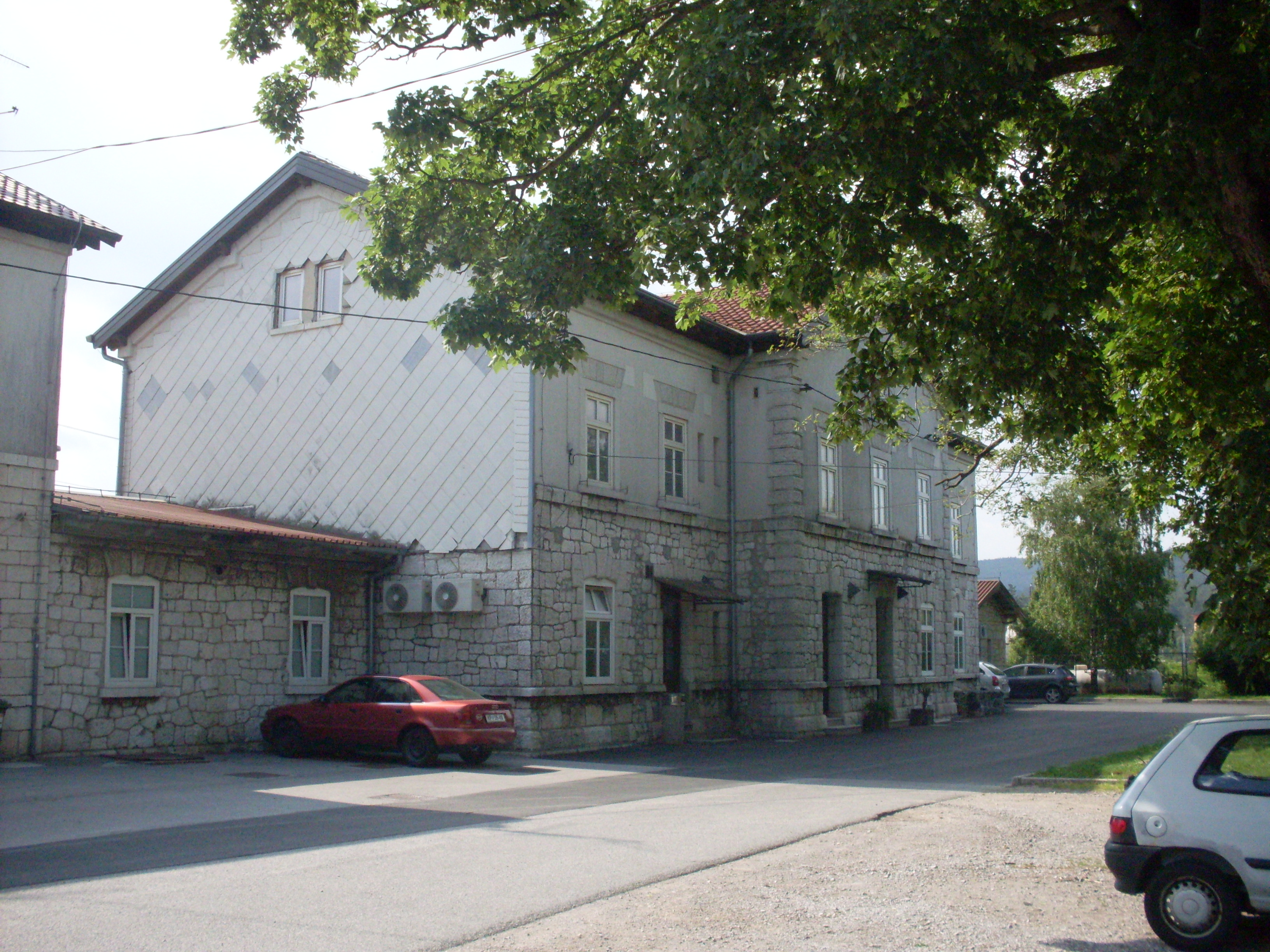
Hrpelje-Kozina railway station in 2011

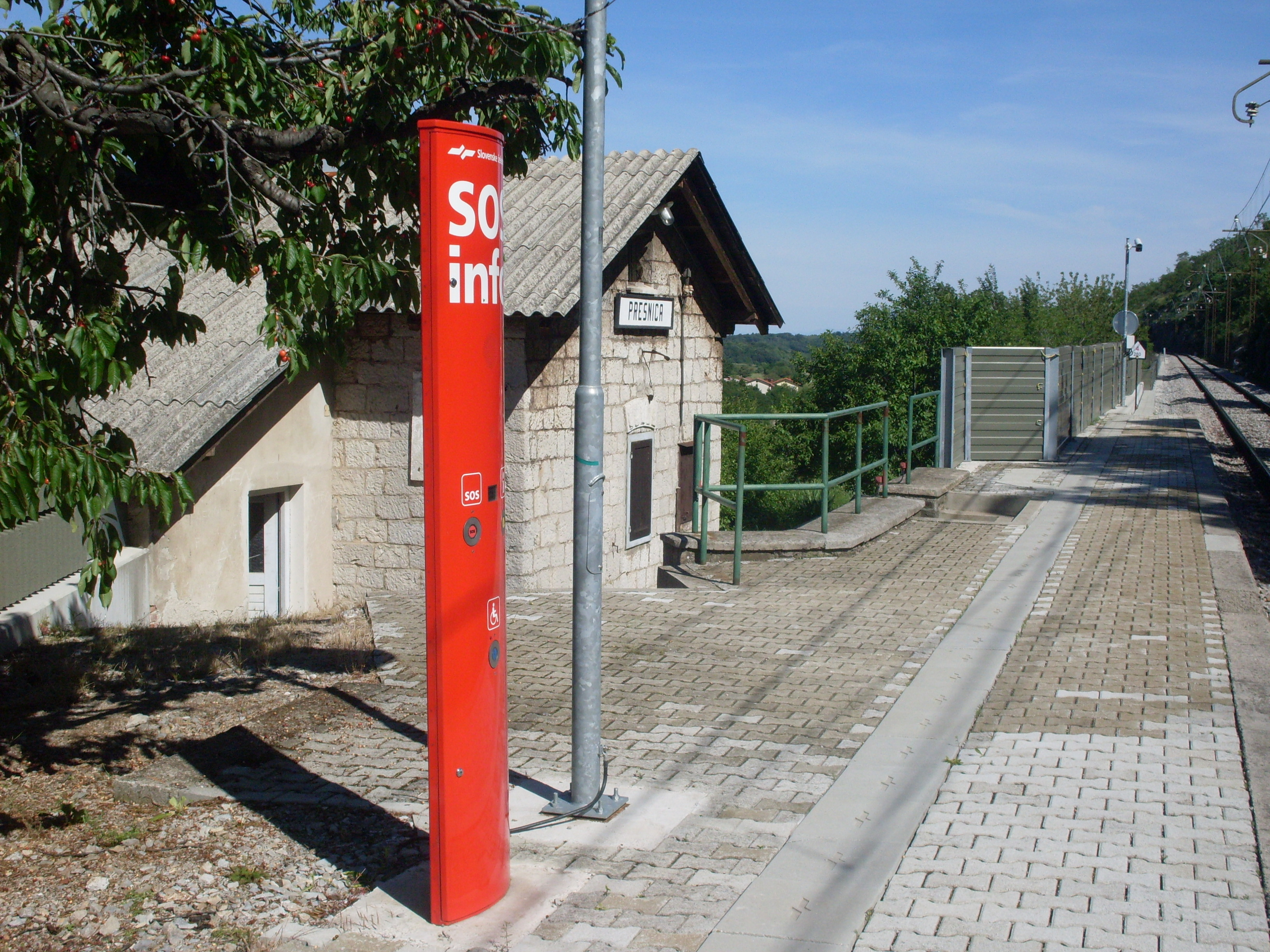
Presnica railway station in 2011

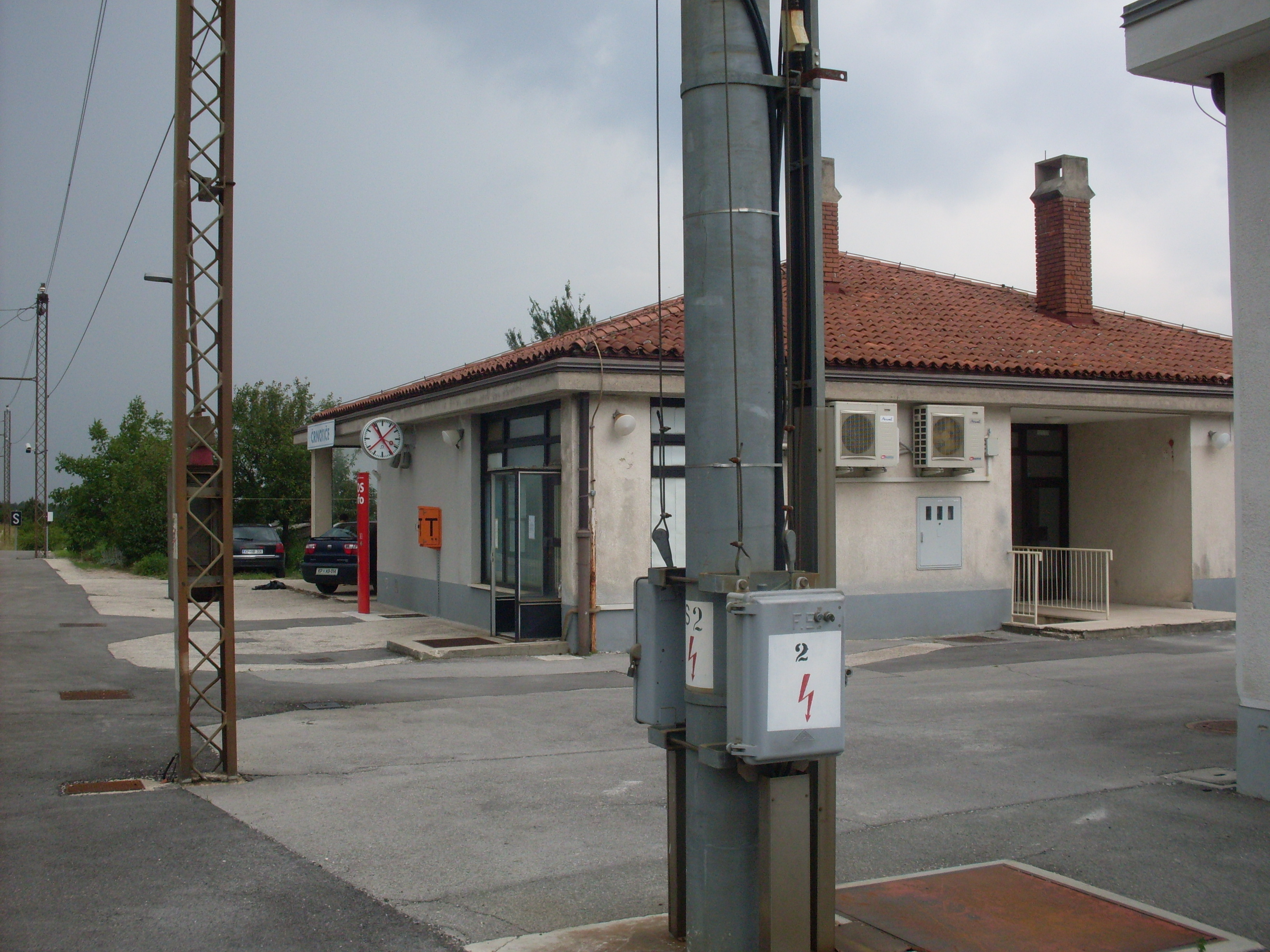
Črnotiče railway station in 2011

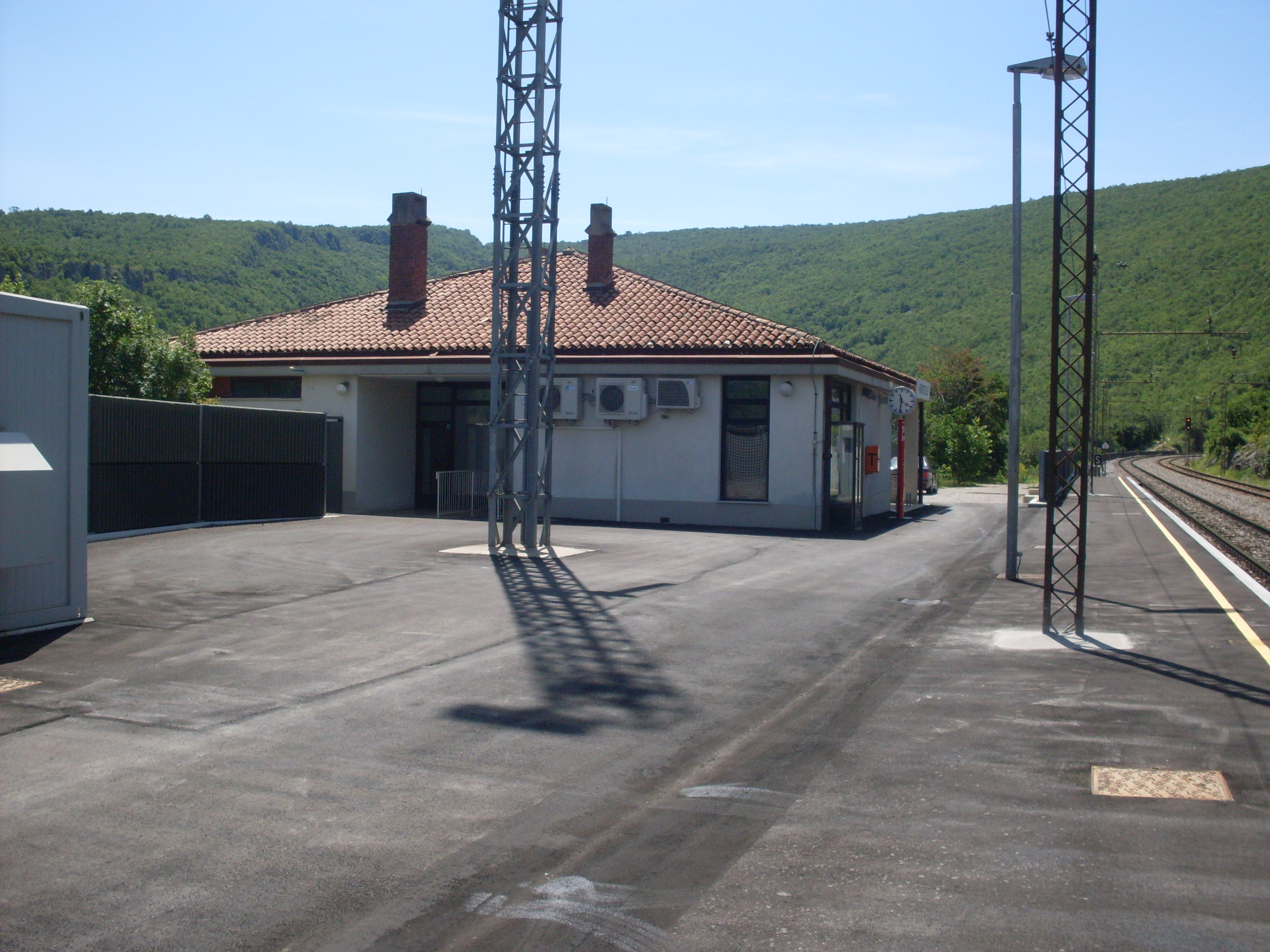
Hrastovlje railway station in 2011

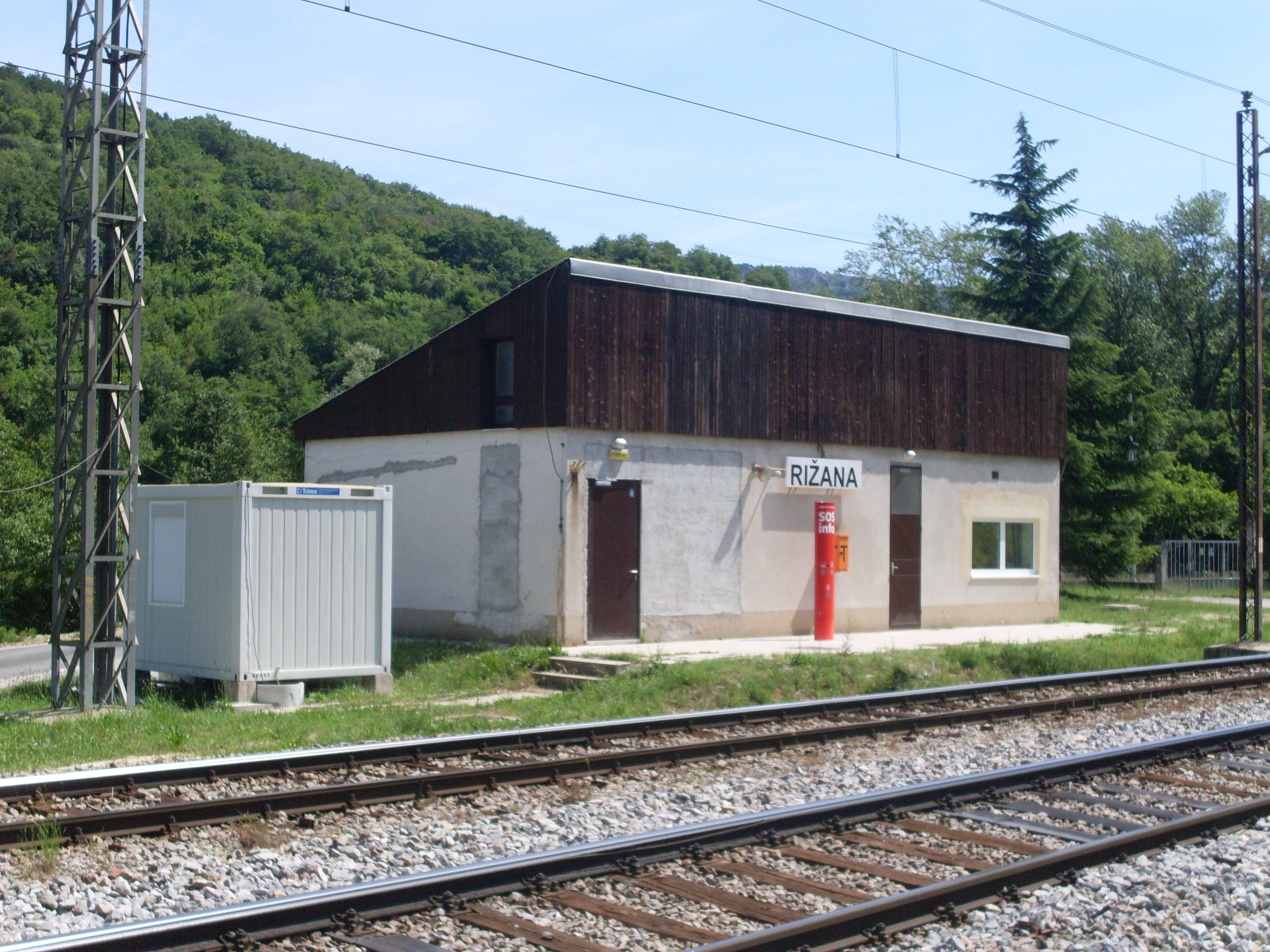
Rižana railway station in 2011

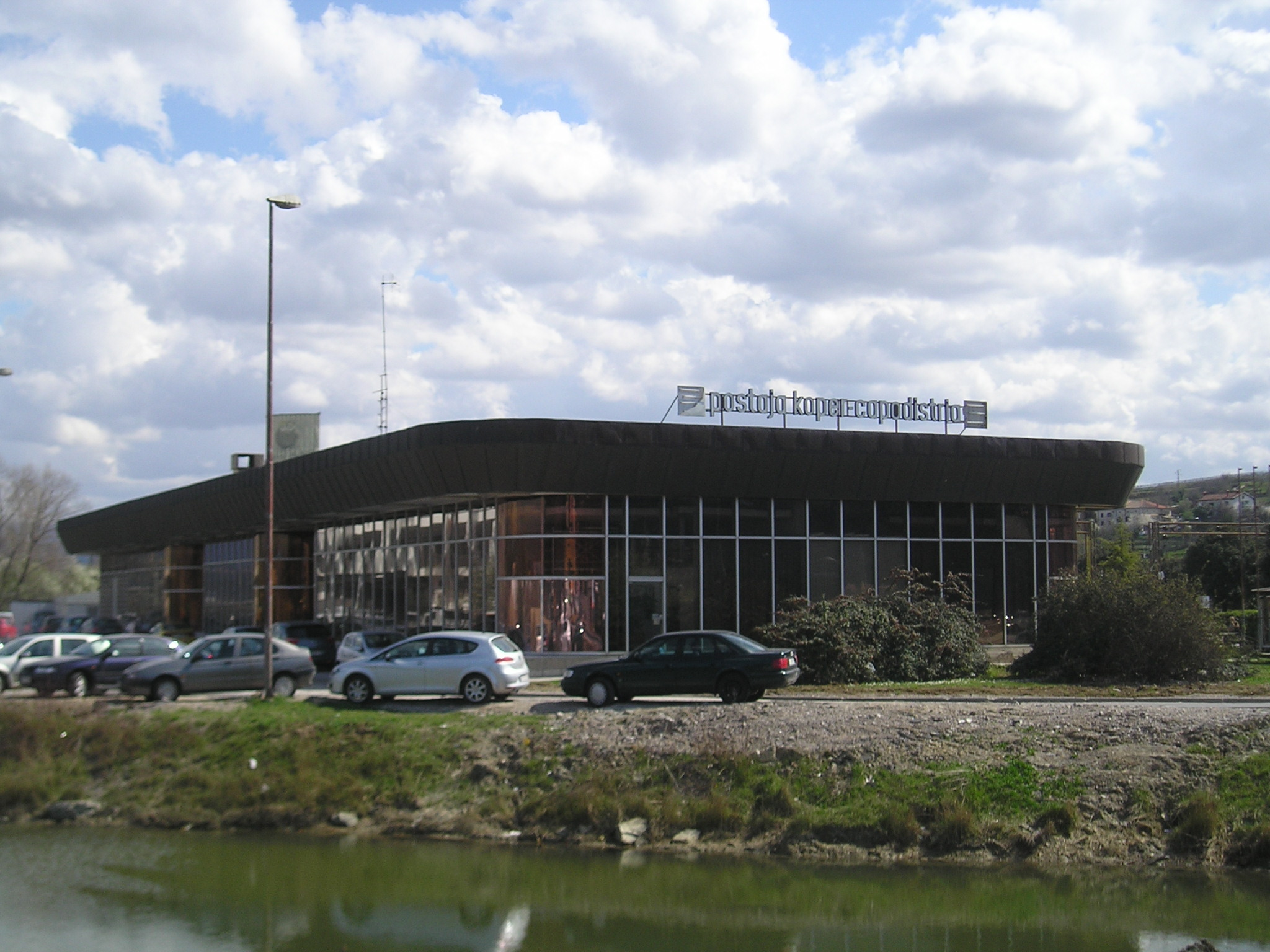
Koper railway station in 2010

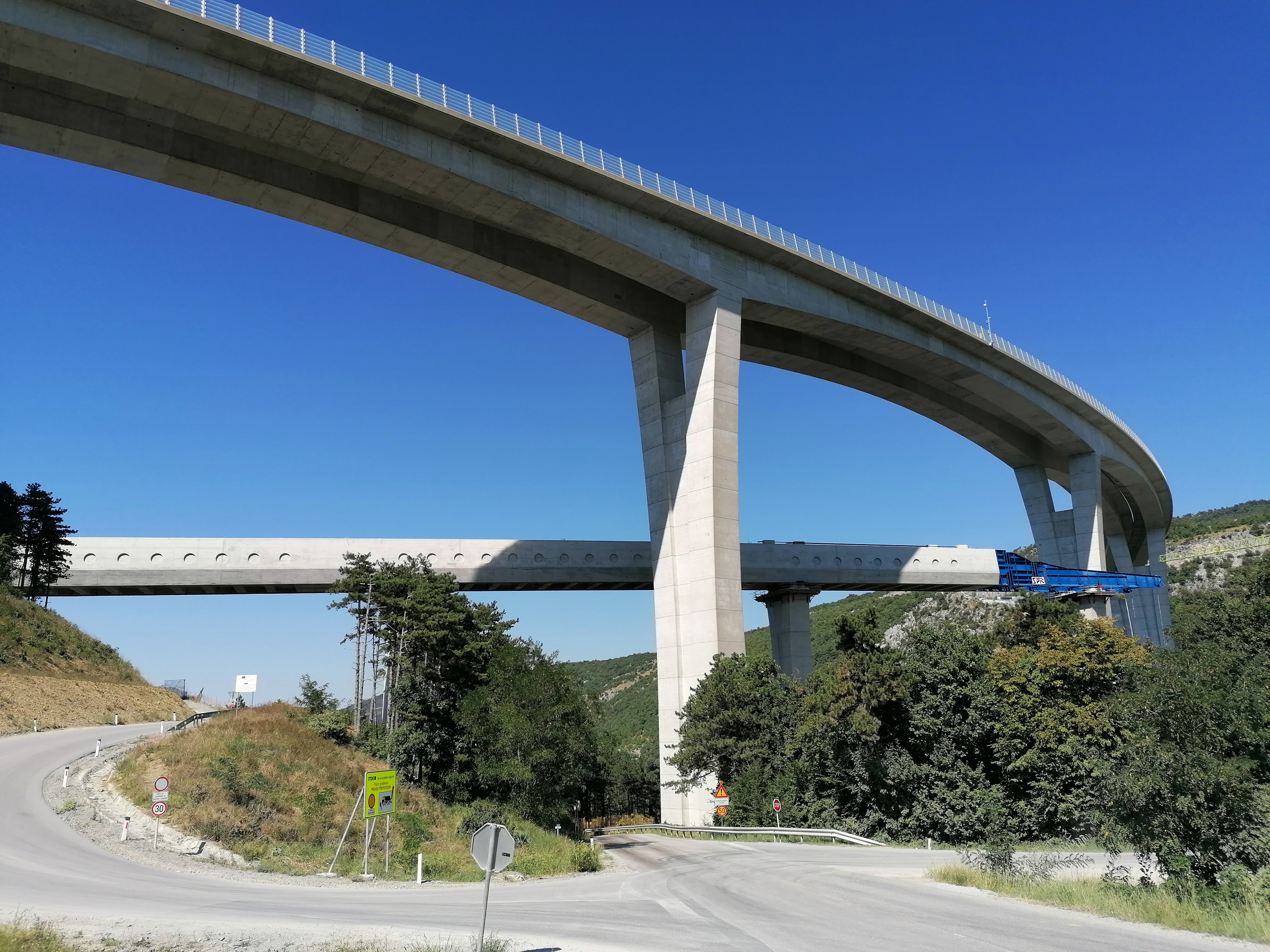
Construction of second track in Črni Kal

== See also ==
- 2017 Slovenian railway referendum
- 2018 Slovenian railway referendum
