= Hrpelje-Kozina railway station =

Railway station in Municipality of Hrpelje-Kozina, Slovenia

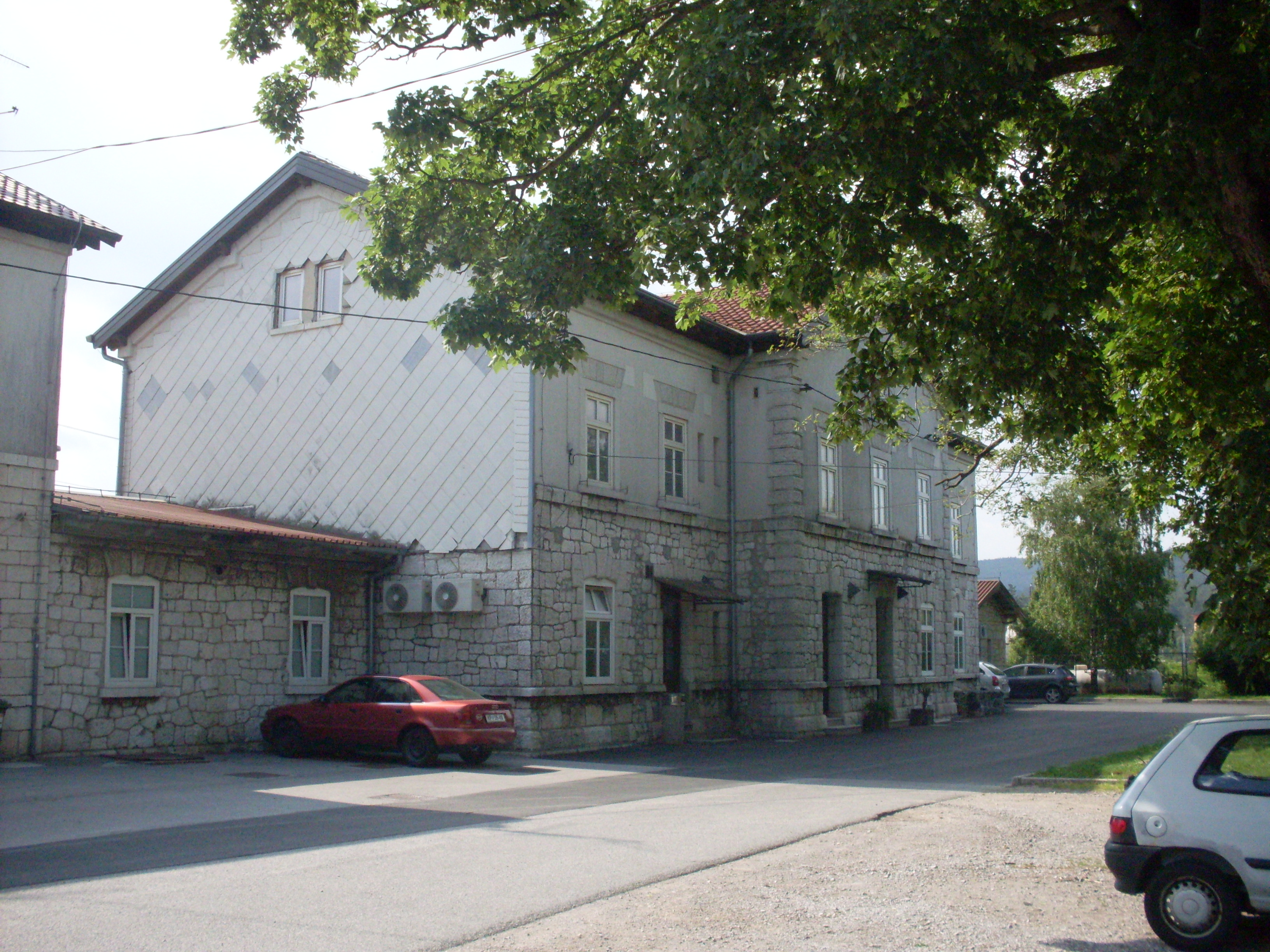
- Hrpelje-Kozina railway station

General information
- Location: Hrpelje-Kozina, Littoral; Slovenia
- Coordinates: 45°36′12″N 13°56′06″E
- Line: Divaca-Koper railway
- Platforms: 2
- Tracks: 5
Location

Hrpelje-Kozina railway station (Slovene: Železniška postaja Hrpelje-Kozina) is a railway station in the Municipality of Hrpelje-Kozina, Littoral, Slovenia. The station lies on the Divaca-Koper railway. The train services are operated by SZ.

== Train services ==
The station is served by the following service(s):

- Intercity: Maribor - Pragersko - Poljcane - Sentjur - Celje - Lasko - Zidani Most - Trbovlje - Zagorje - Litija - Ljubljana - Borovnica - Rakek - Postojna - Pivka - Divaca - Hrpelje-Kozina - Koper
- Intercity: Ljubljana - Borovnica - Logatec - Rakek - Postojna - Pivka - Divaca - Hrpelje-Kozina - Koper
- Regionalni vlak (Regional train): Ljubljana - Ljubljana Tivoli - Brezovica - Notranje Gorice - Preserje - Borovnica - Verd - Logatec - Planina - Rakek - Postojna - Pivka - Kosana - Gornje Lezece - Divaca - Rodik - Hrpelje-Kozina - Presnica - Koper
- Regionalni vlak (Regional train): (Sezana - Povir -) Divaca - Rodik - Hrpelje-Kozina - Presnica - Crnotice - Hrastovlje - Koper
- Regionalni vlak (Regional train): Divaca - Rodik - Hrpelje-Kozina - Presnica - Podgorje - Zazid - Rakitovec
