= 2017 Slovenian railway referendum =

- 24 September 2017
- Are you in favor of enforcing the Act on the Construction, Management and Management of the Second Track of the Divača-Koper Railway Line (ZIUGDT), which was adopted by the National Assembly at its session on May 8, 2017?

Results
Choice	Votes	%
Yes	186,877	53.47%
No	162,596	46.53%
Valid votes	349,473	99.26%
Invalid or blank votes	2,619	0.74%
Total votes	352,092	100.00%
Registered voters/turnout	1,713,532	20.55%

A referendum on a law governing the Divača-Koper rail upgrade was held in Slovenia on 24 September 2017. The referendum was marked by a low turnout; a majority of voters voted in favour of the proposed law. The results were annulled by the Supreme Court in March 2018, resulting in a new referendum being held on 13 May 2018.

== Background ==
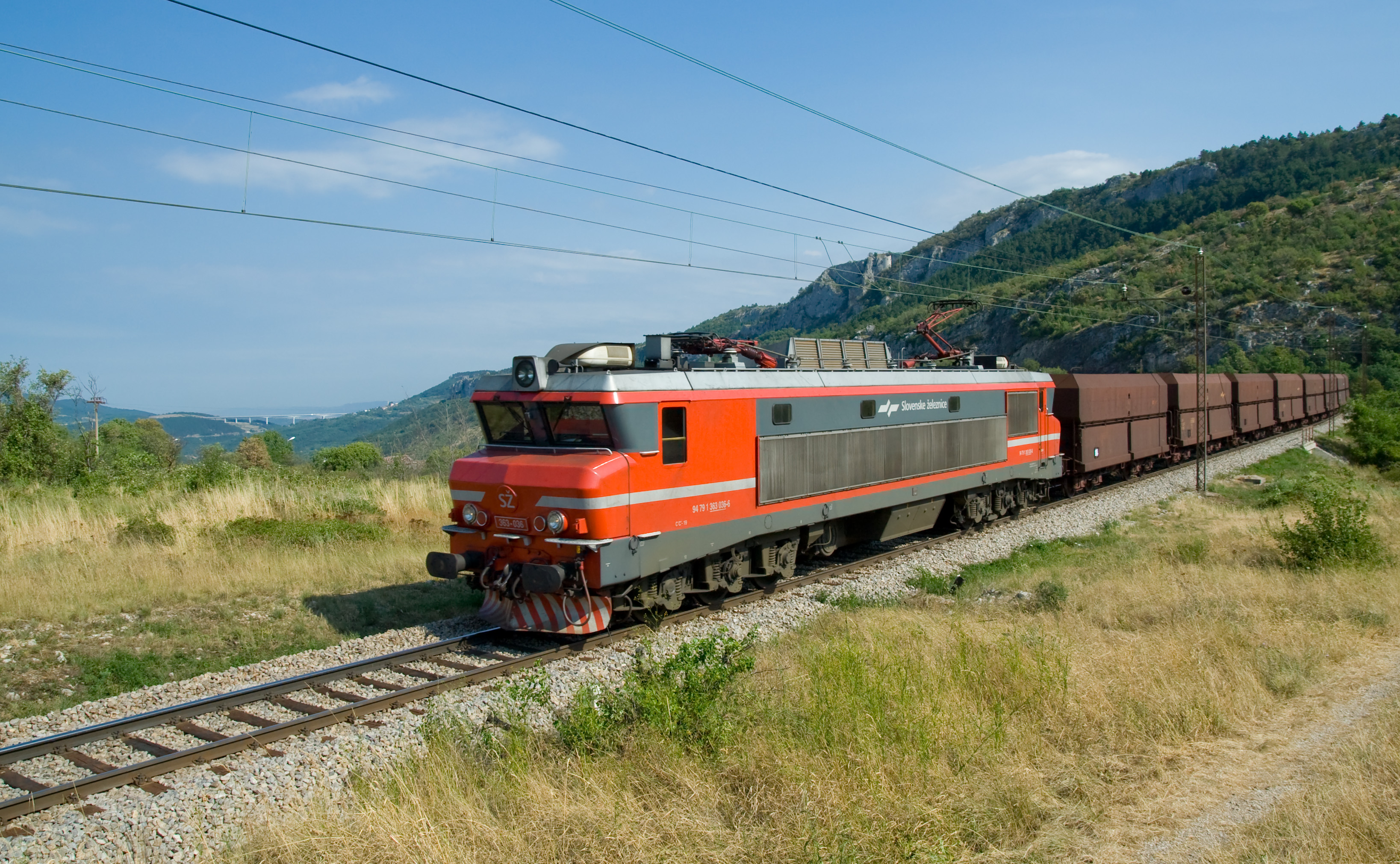
Train on the Divača–Koper Railway

On 8 May 2017, the National Assembly of Slovenia passed a law that deals with the construction of the second railway track from Koper to Divača, in particular regarding the financial plans for the project. The second railway track should help the development of Port of Koper, a major port in the Northern Adriatic Sea, as the existing track was in bad condition and already nearing the traffic limits. The law was opposed by civil activist Vili Kovačič who, supported by several political parties and civil initiatives, called for a referendum to repeal the law. After collecting 40,000 voter signatures, the referendum was set to take place on 24 September 2017.

Per article 90 of the Constitution, 40,000 voters can require the National Assembly to call for a referendum to reject a law that was ratified by the Assembly. The law is rejected if a majority of voters who have cast valid votes vote against the law, provided at least one fifth of all qualified voters have voted against the law. A minimum of 20% of the voters (around 343,000 voters of about 1.7 million registered voters) are required to cast a valid "no" vote for a negative result of the referendum to be valid.

In the referendum campaign, both sides in principle agreed that the second track is required. Opinions differed on the details of the law. Among the concerns of the opponents were the alleged lack of transparency regarding the finances, questions regarding the proposed track route, and the involvement of Hungary as a potential partner in the construction project. Supporters of the law cited the already approved financial contribution of the EU, new job creation, the fact that the rejection of the law would result in the beginning of construction being delayed for several years, and the fact that the proposed route is optimal, based on a series of expert studies and agreed upon by all Slovenian cabinets since 2004. Among major political parties, the law was supported by the coalition partners Modern Centre Party and Social Democrats. DeSUS, also a coalition partner, remained neutral. Among the parties represented in the National Assembly, the law was opposed by the Slovenian Democratic Party, New Slovenia, and The Left. Numerous smaller political parties and civil initiatives took part in the referendum campaign on both sides.

== Results ==
Early voting began on 19 September. 14,201 voters (0.83%) took part in early vote, which was a considerably smaller number than in the previous referendum on same-sex marriage that took place in 2015. In the early vote, 54.14% supported the law and 45.86% opposed it.

The referendum was marked by a low turnout. By 4:00 p.m., only 14.3% voted. Early results showed that the majority of people supported the law. At 9 p.m., with over 98% of the ballots counted, there were 53.3% of supporters. Commenting on the results, the Prime Minister Miro Cerar stated that the results reflect the fact that the voters support the project and that they are fed up with political intrigues. He also stressed that this project will not turn into "another Teš 6", referring to the construction of a new power plant in Šoštanj which was marred by a series of corruption affairs. Peter Gašparič, the Minister of Infrastructure, labeled the referendum as an "unnecessary experiment". The Slovenian Democratic Party stated that they will keep closely monitoring the project and that the positive outcome of the campaign was that the estimated project costs were significantly reduced. The project was expected to open first public tenders for construction in 2018.

Choice	Votes	%
For	186,877	53.47
Against	162,596	46.53
Total	349,473	100.00
Valid votes	349,473	99.26
Invalid/blank votes	2,619	0.74
Total votes	352,092	100.00
Registered voters/turnout	1,713,532	20.55
Source: Volitve

== Aftermath ==
Following the results of the referendum, the impact litigation activist Vili Kovačič contested the results in the Supreme Court, claiming that the law regulating referendums and civil initiatives were not compatible with the constitution, citing the fact that the government had used €97,000 of public funds on the campaign in support of the proposed law.

On 14 March 2018 Supreme Court delivered a judgement, annulling the results and ordered a new vote, which was set for 13 May.

The railway link was the biggest project of the Cerar cabinet. On the same day, Cerar announced his resignation as the Prime Minister, months before the conclusion of his term in office. Cerar stated that the court verdict was "one blow too far" by those who wanted to block the development of Slovenia, mentioning tensions in the coalition among reasons for his resignation.

The referendum was repeated on 13 May 2018, and a slight majority of voters chose no (50.06%). However, the number of registered voters choosing no was too low (at 7.50%), meaning the law remained in force.

== See also ==
- Divača–Koper Railway
- Port of Koper
