= 2018 Slovenian railway referendum =

13 May 2018
- Are you in favor of enforcing the Act on the Construction, Management and Management of the Second Track of the Divača-Koper Railway Line (ZIUGDT), which was adopted by the National Assembly at its session on May 8, 2017?

Results
Choice	Votes	%
Yes	127,293	49.94%
No	127,602	50.06%
Valid votes	254,895	99.14%
Invalid or blank votes	2,203	0.86%
Total votes	257,098	100.00%
Registered voters/turnout	1,712,686	15.01%

A referendum on a law governing the Divača-Koper rail upgrade was held in Slovenia on 13 May 2018. It followed the annulment of the results of a 2017 referendum on the same subject by the Supreme Court in March 2018. The result saw just 309 more votes cast against the law (50.06%) than in favour (49.94%). Voter turnout was even lower than in 2017, at around 15%, meaning that the requirement of 20% of the electorate casting a "no" vote to validate the referendum outcome was not met. As a result, the law remained in force.

== Background ==
On 8 May 2017, the National Assembly of Slovenia passed a law on with the construction of the second railway track from Koper to Divača, specifically regarding the financial plans for the project. The law was opposed by civil activist Vili Kovačič who, supported by several political parties and civil initiatives, called for a referendum to repeal the law. After collecting 40,000 voter signatures, the referendum was set for on 24 September 2017. Although 53.47% of voters approved the law, the referendum was marked by a low turnout of 21%. The project was expected to open first public tenders for construction in 2018.

However, Kovačič contested the results in the Supreme Court, claiming that the law regulating referendums and civil initiatives were not compatible with the constitution, citing the fact that the government had used €97,000 of public funds on the campaign in support of the proposed law. On 14 March 2018 Supreme Court delivered a judgement, annulling the results and ordered a new vote, which was set for 13 May.

The railway link was the biggest project of the Cerar cabinet. On the same day as the Supreme Court decision, Miro Cerar announced his resignation as Prime Minister, leading to early elections being called on 3 June 2018.

The proponents of the referendum expressed a wish for it to be held together with the early general election, thus ensuring a higher voter turnout. However, the Supreme Court backed the decision of the National Election Committee to hold the election and the referendum on separate dates.

== Results ==
Choice	Votes	%
For	127,293	49.94
Against	127,602	50.06
Total	254,895	100.00
Valid votes	254,895	99.14
Invalid/blank votes	2,203	0.86
Total votes	257,098	100.00
Registered voters/turnout	1,712,686	15.01
Source: Volitve

== Reactions ==
In first reaction, Vili Kovačič, who initiated the referendum, announced he was again planning to contest the result at the Constitutional court. Miro Cerar, the acting Prime Minister, and Peter Gašperšič, the acting Minister for Infrastructure, expressed their satisfaction with the outcome, stating that they expect the project to continue soon. Cerar further blamed Kovačič and Janez Janša for essentially holding the country hostage and delaying the project for a year.
