= Rafael Bačar =

Slovene biologist and ornithologist (1902–1975)

- Born: January 2, 1902; Divača, Slovenia
- Died: April 21, 1975 (aged 73); Ljubljana, Slovenia
- Occupations: Biologist and ornithologist

Rafael Franc Jožef Bačar (January 2, 1902 – April 21, 1975) was a Slovene biologist and ornithologist.

== Early life and education ==
Rafael Bačar was born in Divača, the son of the metalworker Andrej Bačar and Henrika Bačar (née Jelenčič). He graduated from high school in Ljubljana in 1921, and he studied zoology and botany at the University of Ljubljana. He received his bachelor's degree in 1926. He received his doctorate in 1960 with the dissertation Arundo donax L. – trska – njen uzgoj i ekologija u NR Makedoniji (Arundo donax L.—Reed—Its Growth and Ecology in the People's Republic of Macedonia).

== Career ==
Bačar taught as a high school teacher from 1927 to 1933. During the Second World War, he was arrested and held in internment camps. After the war, he initially worked as the head of the National and Research Library in Trieste (Slovene: Narodno in študijsko knjižnico v Trstu, NŠKT). He became an assistant professor at the University of Skopje in 1949, and then an associate professor. In 1963 he became a full professor at the University of Maribor.

Bačar wrote articles on biology, hydrobiology, phytosociology, fisheries, and ornithology.

Rafael Bačar died in Ljubljana in 1975.
