= Gregor Žiberna =

Slovene speleologist (1855–1929)

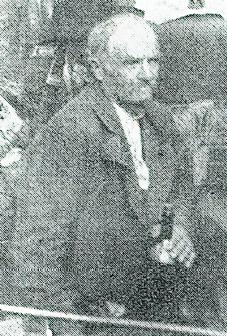
- Born: March 9, 1855; Divača, Slovenia
- Died: February 17, 1929 (aged 73); Divača, Slovenia
- Occupations: Butcher, speleologist

Gregor Žiberna (March 9, 1855 – February 17, 1929) was a Slovene butcher and speleologist.

== Early life ==
Gregor Žiberna was born in Divača, the son of the tailor Janez Žiberna and his wife Frančiška (née Malnaršič). He was a skilled sausage maker and meat smoker. In his youth, he and his brother Nace opened the first Slovene café in Trieste and then a delicatessen; however, as ethnically conscious Slovenians, they came into conflict with Italian irredentists and were expelled from the city. Žiberna returned to his birthplace and lived in a stable with his brother France.

== Cave exploration ==
Žiberna was a local village character that tricked many people and was therefore nicknamed Tentava (cf. Slovene: tentati 'to trick, fool'). He was not regularly employed. For a fee, he captured vipers and magpies for museums and schools, and at the same time he ventured into the nearby karst carverns with great enthusiasm. In 1884, he became well known with his discovery of Divača Cave (Slovene: Divaška jama, originally called Rudolf's Cave, Rudolfova jama). Together with his fellow villager Jakob Rešaver, he explored the entire cave, and he named individual stalactites and other details with Slovene names, which have mostly been lost. In 1885, the Municipality of Divača built paths and an entrance to the cave, and the cave began to be visited by locals and many people from abroad. Žiberna worked as the cave keeper and as a cave guide because he also spoke German and Italian. In 1886, the municipality entered into a lease agreement for 10 years with the Austrian tourist club in Vienna, but the two partners annulled it in 1890, and the cave came under the management of the mountain hiking association. After the Second World War, the cave was not accessible to tourists because in 1943 German forces dynamited the entrance so that the Partisans could not use it as a shelter.

Žiberna was an extremely bold and skilled climber in the karst caves. On September 16, 1889, with the help of a winch, he descended 190 m down a vertical chasm to the bottom of nearby Snake Cave (Slovene: Kačna jama) and provided the Trieste speleologist Anton Hanke (1840–1891) with the first information about it. Four years later, in agreement with the Trieste speleologist Josef Marinitsch (1838–1915) and four other locals, he built a wooden ladder from the entrance to the bottom of the Snake Cave, which took 315 days, along with considerable effort and risk. He also participated in expeditions by foreign explorers of Slovenia's caves, especially from Vienna and Trieste, which is why his name appears in foreign speleological literature.

== Death ==
Due to Žiberna's carelessness, there was a fire in the stable where he lived. He escaped the fire, but he caught a cold in the severe winter weather, contracted pneumonia, and succumbed to it.
