= Pivka railway station =

Railway station in Slovenia

Pivka
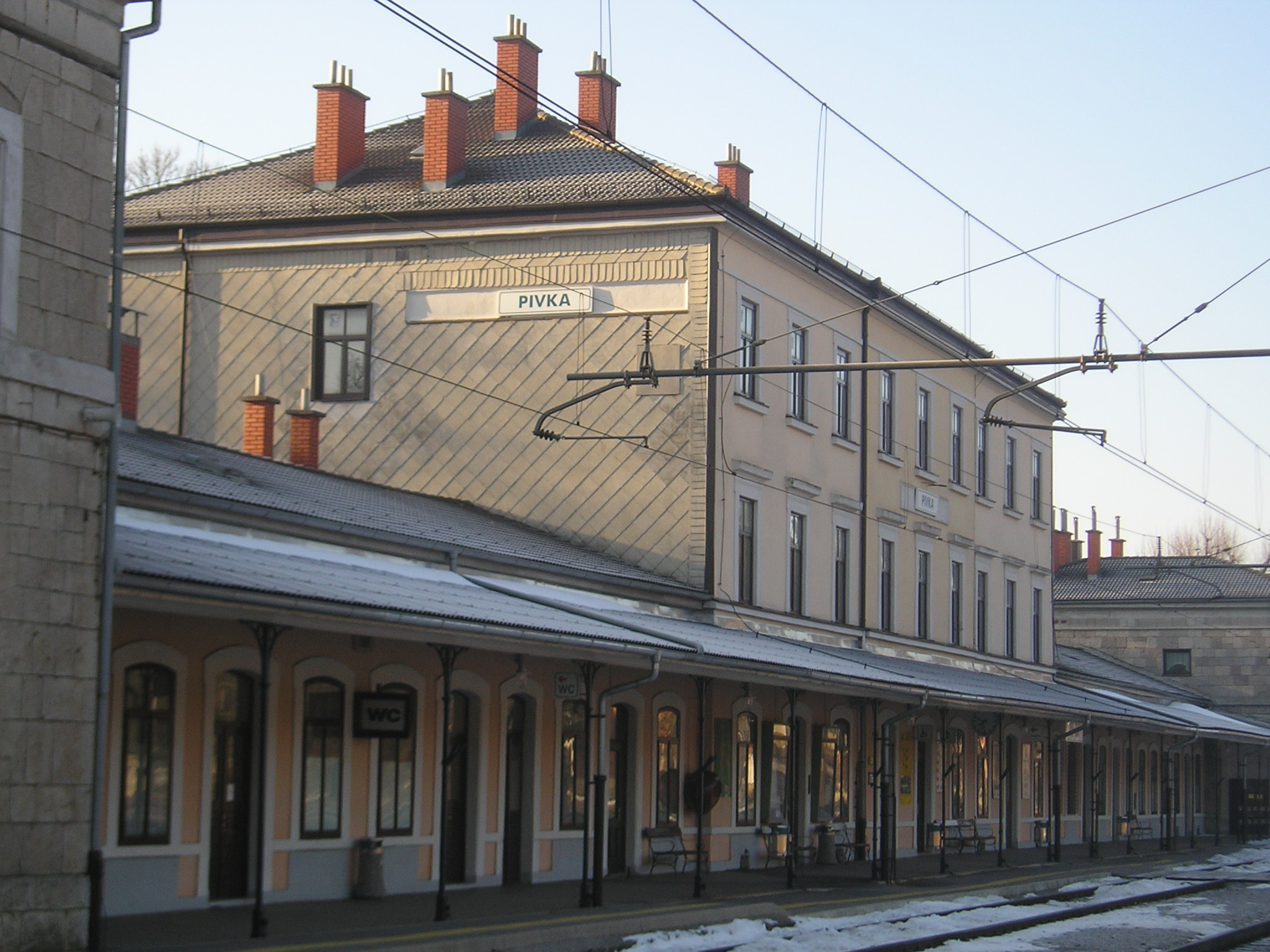

General information
- Location: Kolodvorska cesta 6257 Pivka; Slovenia
- Coordinates: 45°40′31″N 14°11′29″E
- Owner: Slovenske železnice
- Operator: Slovenske železnice
Location
- Location within Slovenia

Pivka railway station (Slovene: Železniška postaja Pivka) is a significant railway station in Pivka, Slovenia. It is located on the main railway line between Ljubljana, Slovenia and Trieste, Italy
