= Brezovica railway station =

Railway station in Slovenia

Brezovica
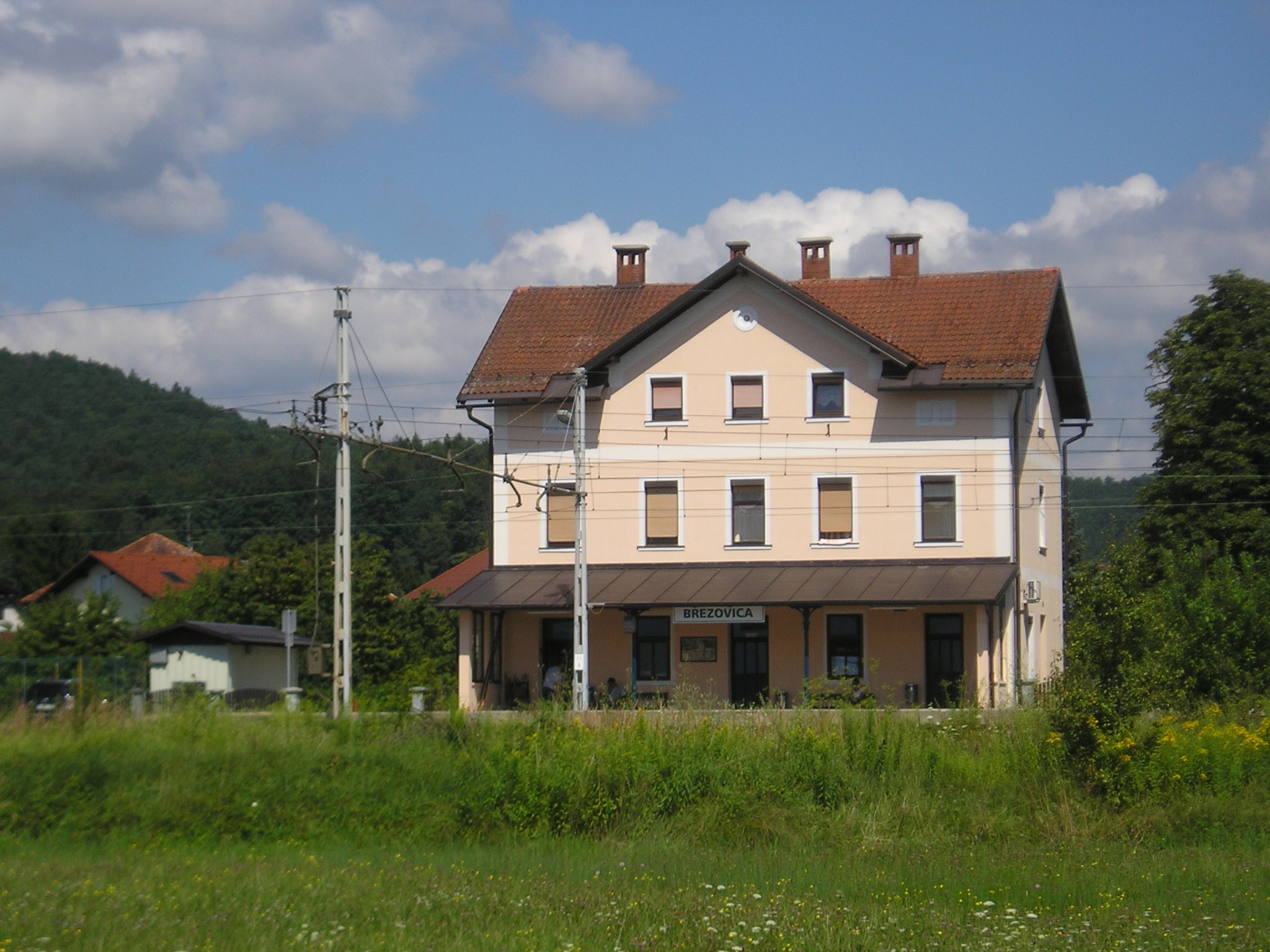

General information
- Location: 1351 Brezovica; Slovenia
- Coordinates: 46°01′17″N 14°25′35″E
- Owner: Slovenian Railways
- Operator: Slovenian Railways
Location
- Location within Slovenia

Brezovica railway station (Slovene: Železniška postaja Brezovica) is the principal railway station in Brezovica, Slovenia.
