= Sežana railway station =

Railway station in Slovenia

Sežana
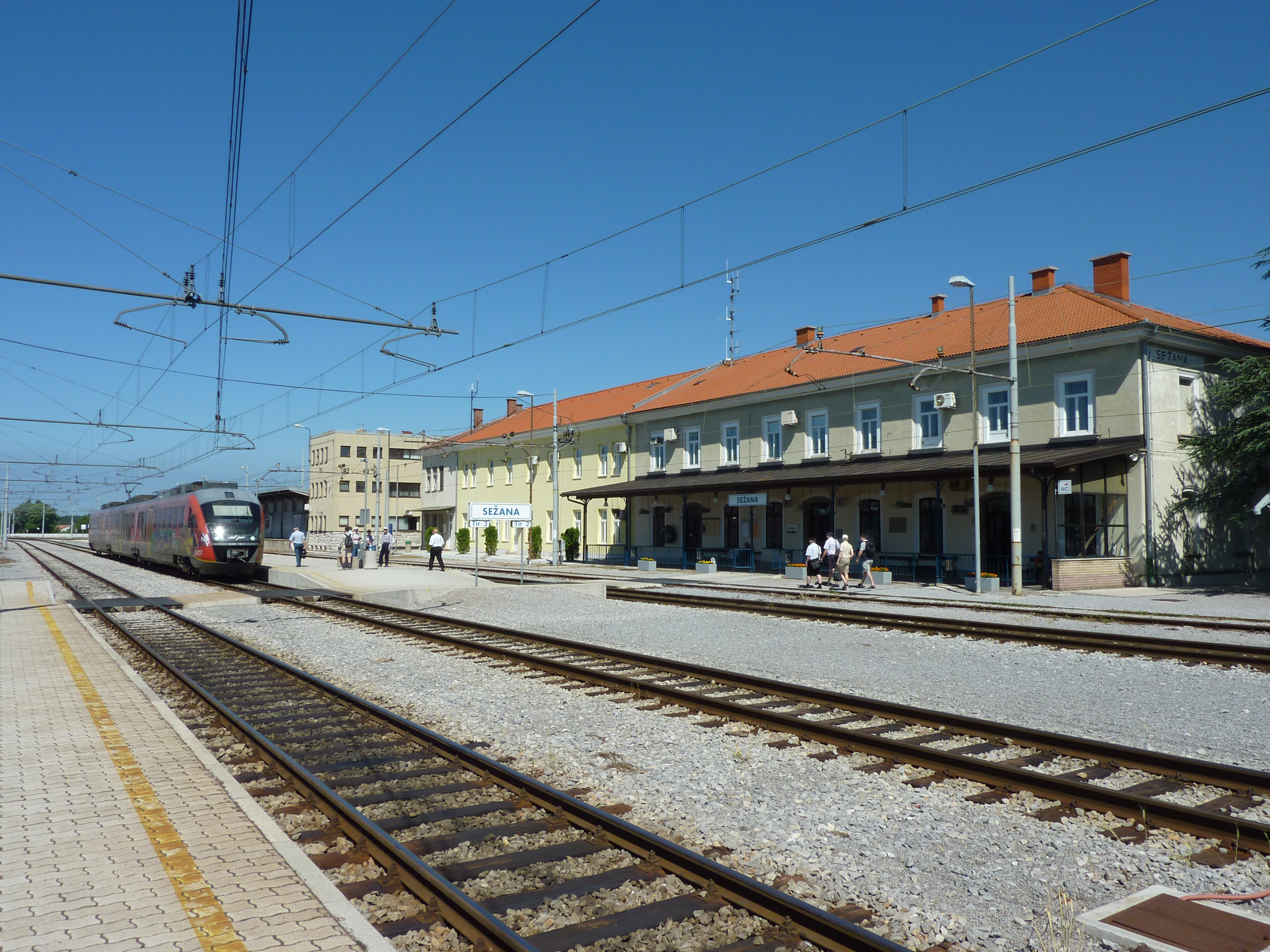
- The station building and platforms.

General information
- Location: Skladiščna ulica 6210 Sežana; Slovenia
- Coordinates: 45°42′15″N 13°51′48″E
- Owner: Slovenske železnice
- Operator: Slovenske železnice Trenitalia
- Lines: Vienna–Trieste; Sežana–Kreplje

History
- Opened: 28 July 1857
Location
- Location within Slovenia

Sežana railway station (Slovene: Železniška postaja Sežana; Italian: Stazione di Sesana; German: Bahnhof Sežana) serves the town and municipality of Sežana, in the Littoral region of Slovenia.

== Location ==
The station forms part of the important rail link originally built as the South railway, between Vienna, Austria, and Trieste, Italy. It is situated very close to the border between Slovenia and Italy.

== History ==
The station was opened on 19 July 1857, as Bahnhof Sežana (its German language name). At that time, it was located within the Austrian Empire, and its original operator was the Austrian Southern Railway, a privately owned enterprise.

After World War I, and the annexation of Sežana to the Kingdom of Italy, the station was renamed Stazione di Sesana (its Italian language name). Responsibility for operating the station passed to the Ferrovie dello Stato (State Railways of the Kingdom of Italy).

In 1947, following the end of World War II, the Socialist Federal Republic of Yugoslavia took control of Sežana. The station, renamed Železniška postaja Sežana (its Slovenian language name), became the Vienna–Trieste railway's border crossing point between Italy and Yugoslavia, and its operations were reassigned to Yugoslav Railways (Slovene: Jugoslovanske železnice).

In 1948, the station became a junction station for a branch line to Kreplje, where the branch linked up with the Bohinj Railway and the rest of the Yugoslavian rail network.

Upon the commencement of Slovenian independence in 1991, the Slovenske železnice took over as operator.
