= Postojna railway station =

Railway station in Slovenia

Postojna
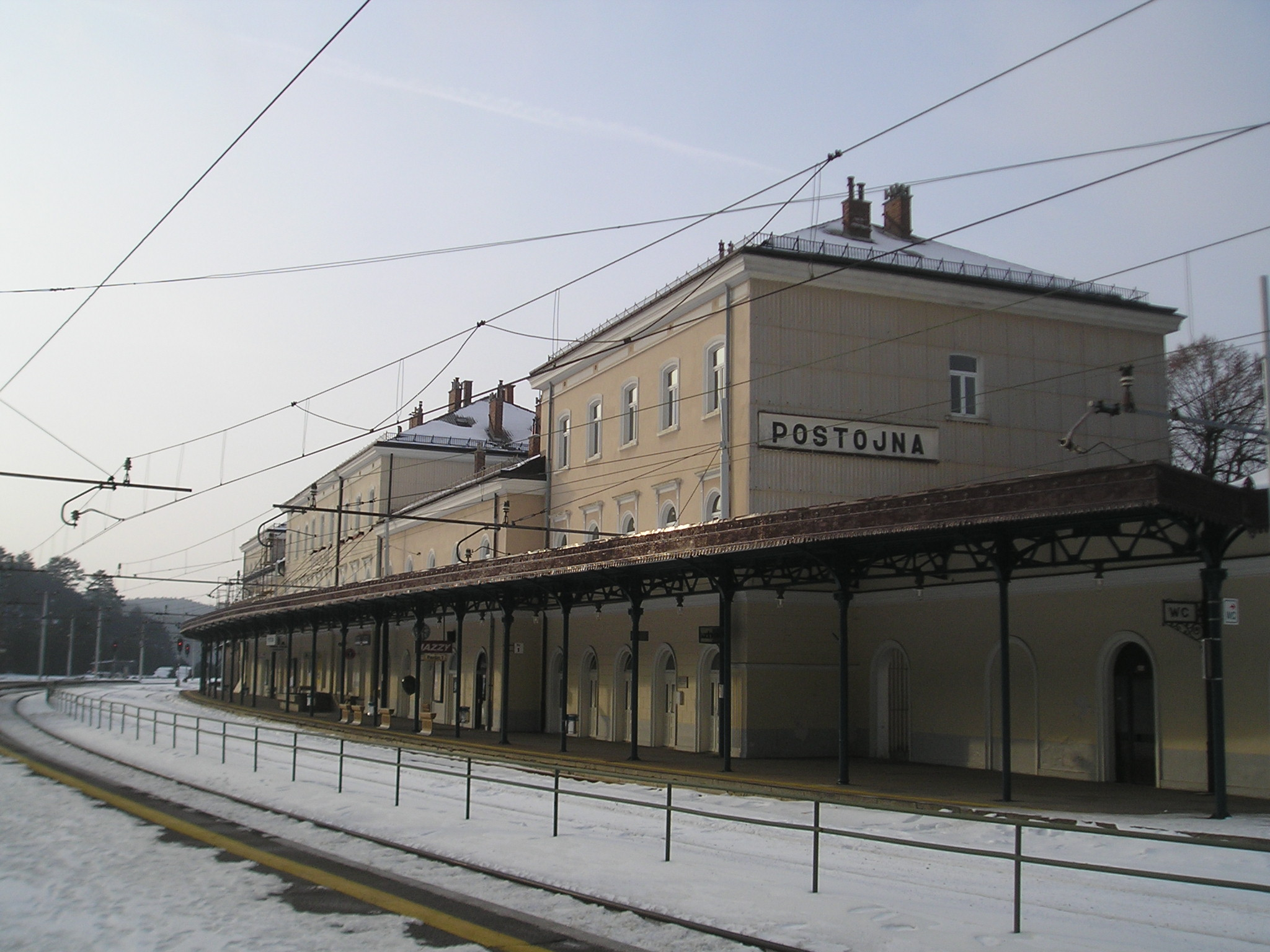
- View of the station building.

General information
- Location: Kolodvorska cesta 6232 Postojna; Slovenia
- Coordinates: 45°46′23″N 14°13′16″E
- Elevation: 582 metres (1,909 ft)
- Owner: Slovenske železnice
- Operator: Slovenske železnice
Location
- Location within Slovenia

Postojna railway station (Slovene: Železniška postaja Postojna) is a significant railway station in Postojna, Slovenia. It is located on the main railway line between Ljubljana, Slovenia and Trieste, Italy.

At an elevation of 582 metres (1,909 ft), Postojna is the highest railway station in Slovenia. The station lies a few kilometres south of the Postojna Gate, a major pass of the Dinaric Alps, where is the highest point on the line between Ljubljana and Trieste.
