= Divača railway station =

Railway station in Divača, Slovenia

Divača
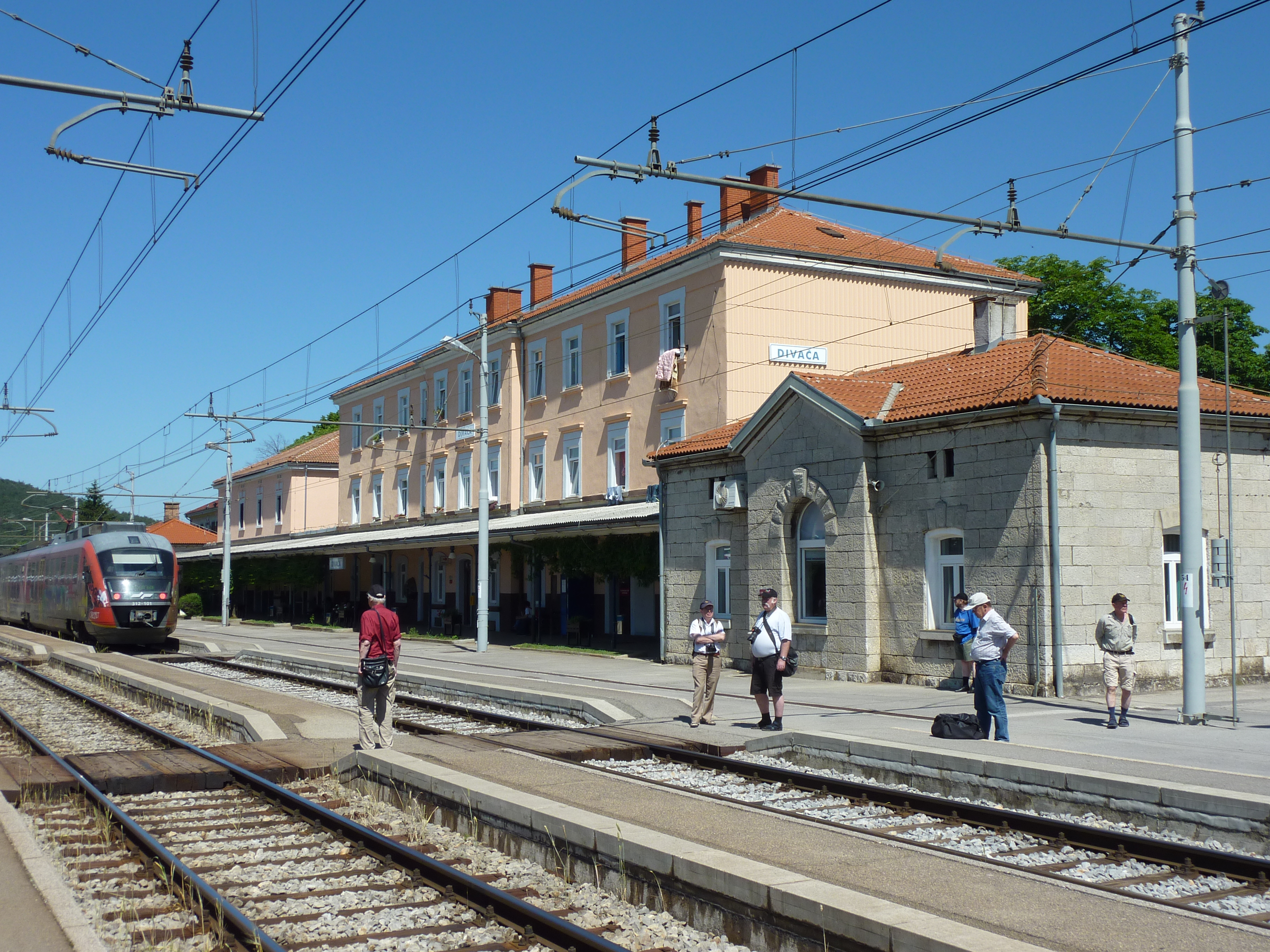

General information
- Location: 6215 Divača; Slovenia
- Coordinates: 45°40′54″N 13°57′55″E
- Owner: Slovenske železnice
- Operator: Slovenske železnice

History
- Opened: 1857
Location
- Location within Slovenia

Divača railway station (Slovene: Železniška postaja Divača) is a significant railway station in Divača, Slovenia. It was opened in 1857, and is located close to the Italian border, on the main railway line between Ljubljana, Slovenia and Trieste, Italy.
