= Koper railway station =

Railway station in Koper, Slovenia

Koper-Capodistria
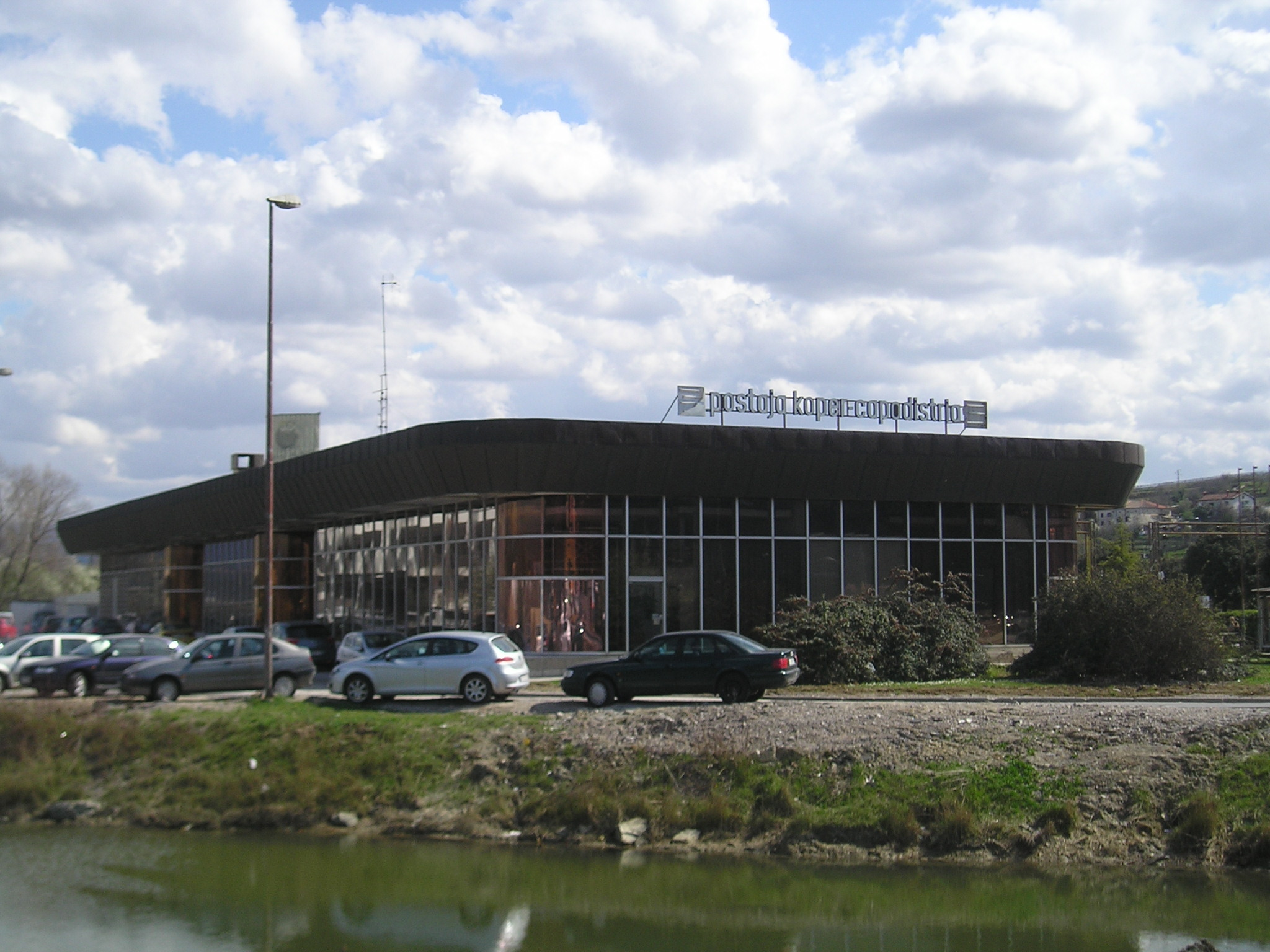
- Front of the main building

General information
- Location: 6000 Koper; Slovenia
- Coordinates: 45°32′21″N 13°44′18″E
- Elevation: 3 m (9.8 ft)
- Owner: Republic of Slovenia, Slovenian Infrastructure Agency
- Operator: Slovenian Railways
- Connections: Koper bus station (nearby)

Construction
- Architect: Rudolf Kolenc

History
- Opened: 1979
- Rebuilt: 2026
Location
- Location within Slovenia

Koper railway station (Slovene: Železniška postaja Koper, Italian: Stazione ferroviaria di Capodistria) is a railway station in Koper, Slovenia.

== History ==
The railway station building in Koper was built in 1979 as a joint facility for the needs of both rail and bus public transport. The investors and owners of the station building were then Železniško gospodarstvo Ljubljana and bus operator Slavnik Koper. After the bankruptcy of Slavnik and the transformation of the company Železniško gospodarstvo Ljubljana into Slovenian Railways, the station, like all public railway infrastructure, became state property and is now managed by Slovenian Infrastructure Agency and operated by Slovenian Railways.
