= Celje railway station =

Railway station in Celje, Slovenia

Celje
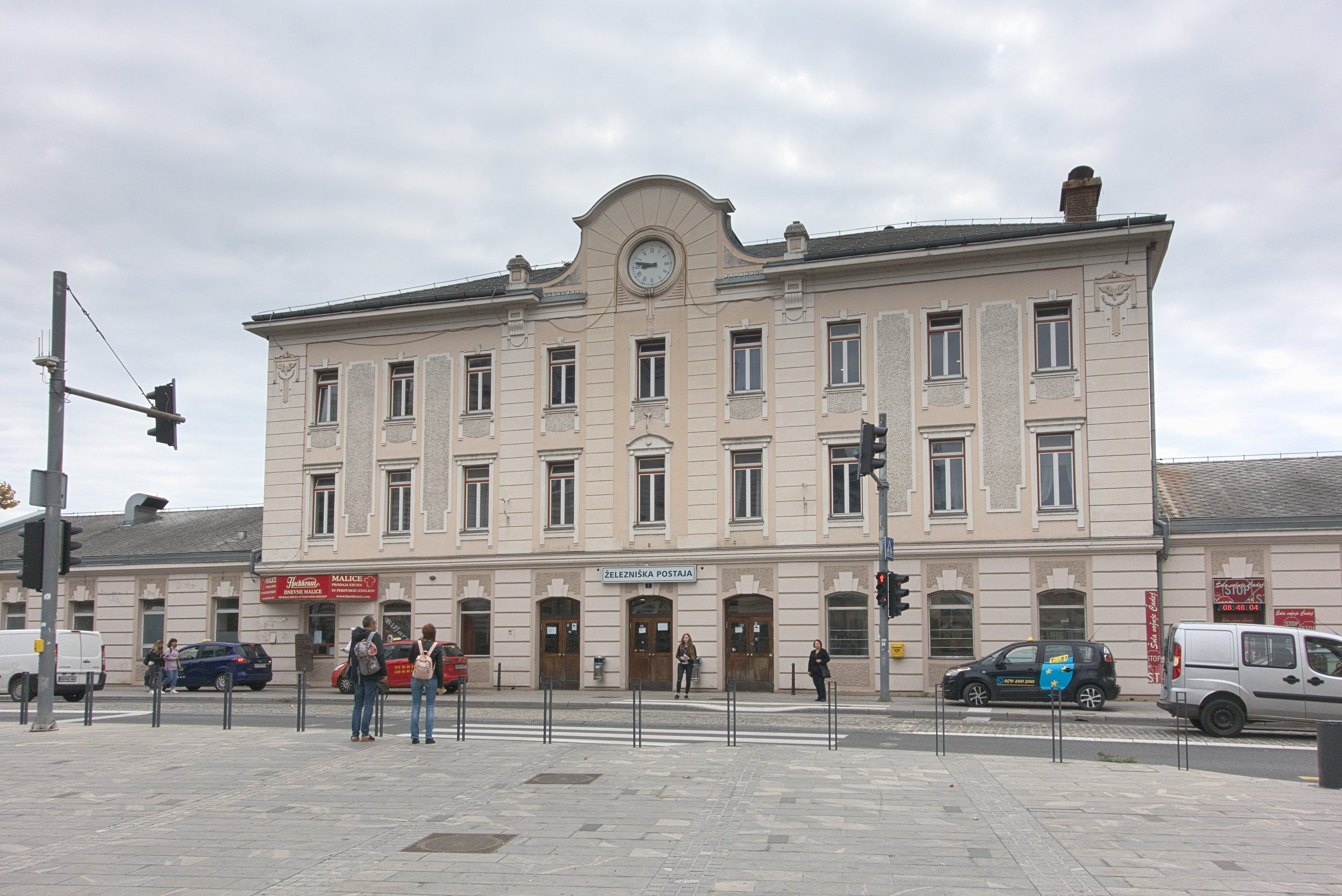
- Front of the main building (2014).

General information
- Location: 3000 Celje; Slovenia
- Coordinates: 46°13′43″N 15°16′03″E
- Elevation: 241 m (791 ft)
- Owner: Slovenske železnice
- Operator: Slovenske železnice

History
- Opened: 1846
Location
- Location within Slovenia

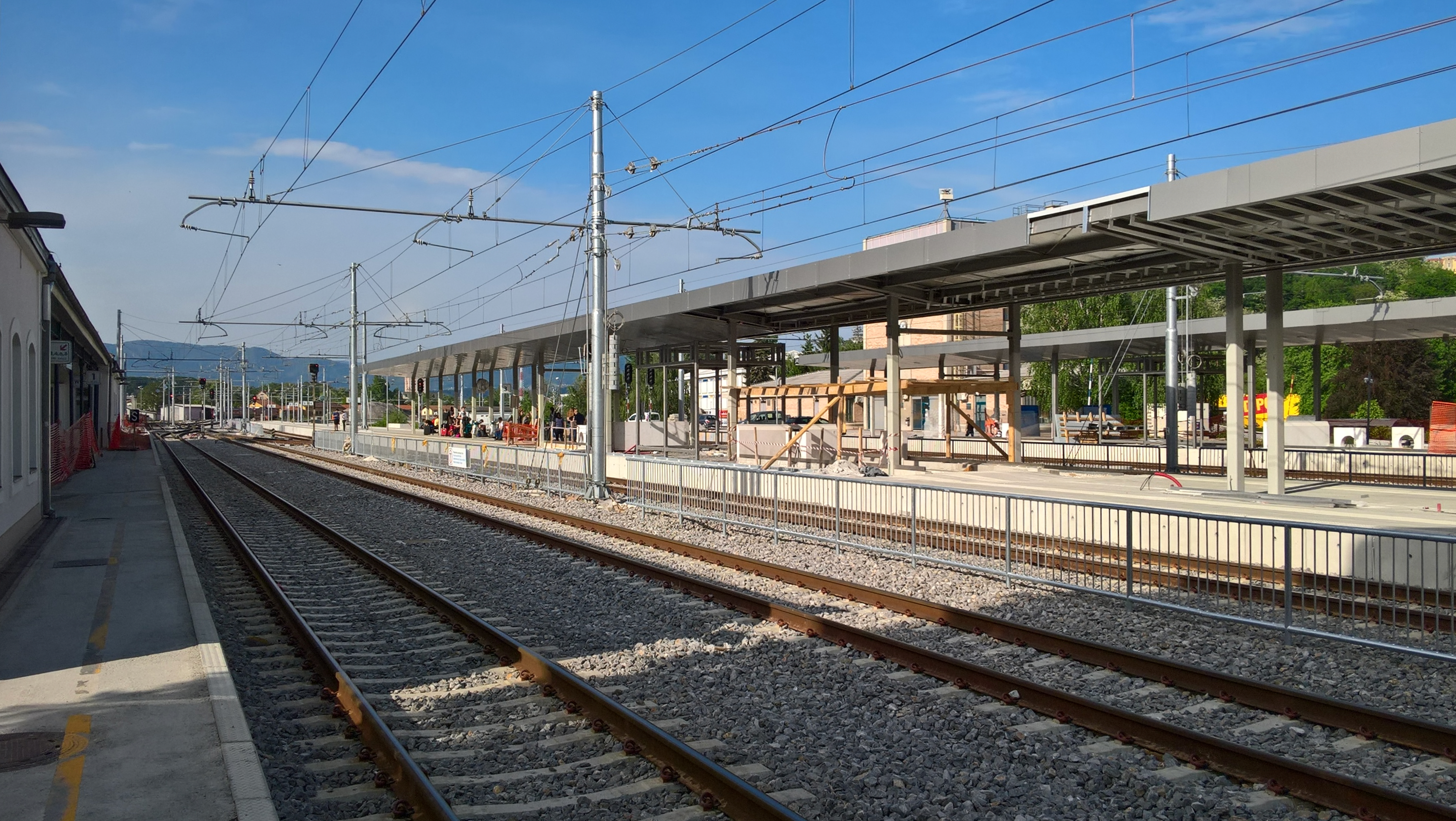
Platforms 3–4 undergoing renovations including an extended roof in May 2018

Celje railway station is a railway station in Celje, Slovenia. It was erected in 1846.
