= Borovnica railway station =

Slovenian railway station

Borovnica
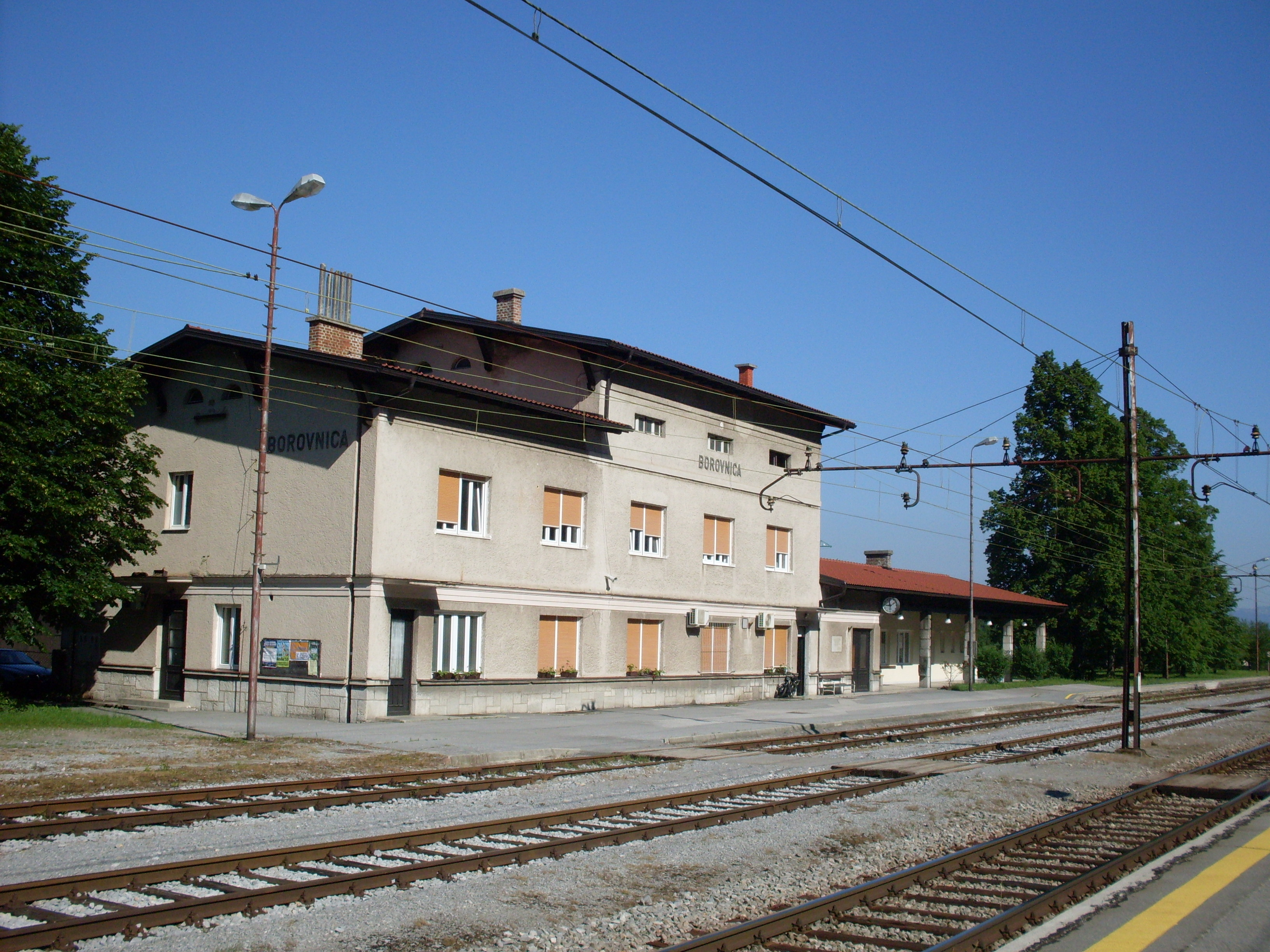

General information
- Location: 1353 Borovnica; Slovenia
- Coordinates: 45°55′17″N 14°22′04″E
- Owner: Slovenian Railways
- Operator: Slovenian Railways

History
- Opened: 1856; 170 years ago
- Rebuilt: 1947; 79 years ago
Location
- Location within Slovenia

Borovnica railway station (Slovene: Železniška postaja Borovnica) is the principal railway station in Borovnica, Slovenia. The old building of the station was built in 1856 at the beginning of Borovnica Viaduct. It stayed in use until the viaduct was demolished during World War II in the 1940s. The new station building was built and opened in 1947.
