= Divača =

Divača Divaccia
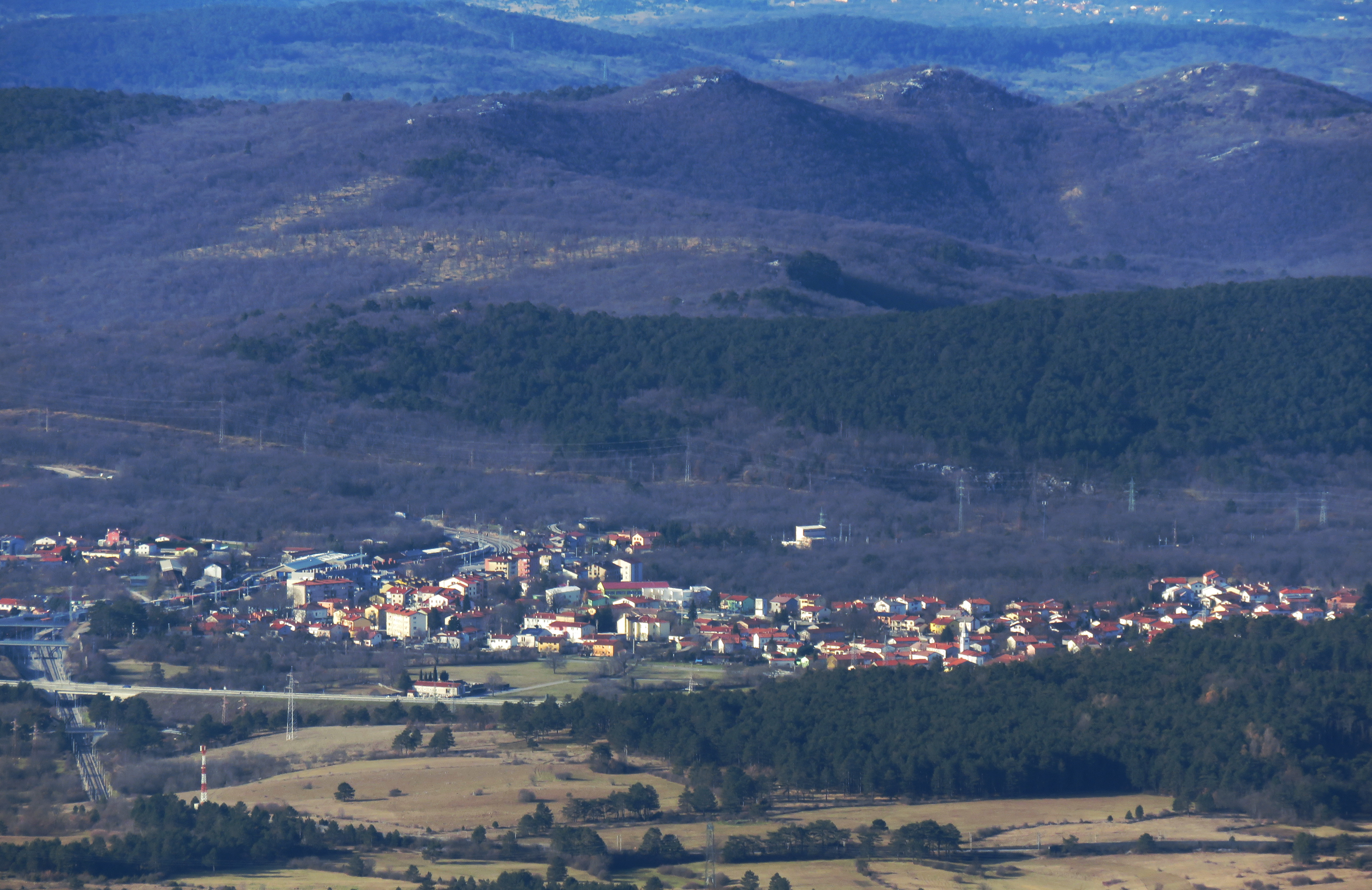

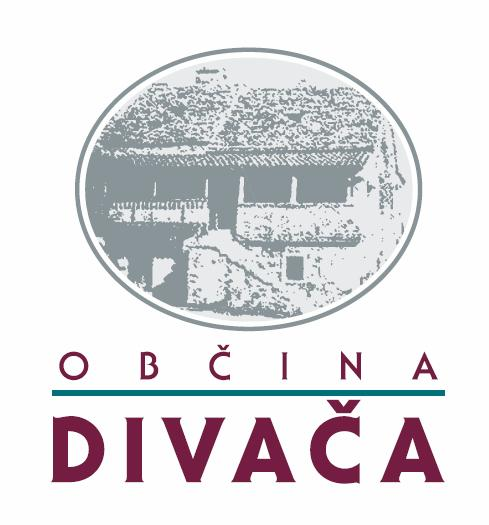
- Seal

- Location in Slovenia
- Coordinates: 45°40′55.1″N 13°58′12.6″E
- Country: Slovenia
- Traditional region: Littoral
- Statistical region: Coastal–Karst
- Municipality: Divača

Area
  - Total: 7.8 km^{2} (3.0 sq mi)
- Elevation: 435 m (1,427 ft)

Population (2025)
  - Total: 1,911
  - Density: 250/km^{2} (630/sq mi)
- Postal code: 6215 Divača

Divača (pronounced [diˈʋaːtʃa]; Italian: Divaccia) is a large nucleated village in the Littoral region of Slovenia, near the Italian border. It is the seat of the Municipality of Divača and a railway hub.

== Geography ==
Divača lies along the A1 motorway and the old main road from Senožeče to Koper, with a junction that also leads to Lokev. The Vremščica Ridge (1,027 meters or 3,369 feet) rises to the northeast, Čebulovica Hill (643 meters or 2,110 feet) to the north, and Kožlek Hill (517 meters or 1,696 feet) to the west. Tilled fields mostly lie to the northeast, and pastures to the northwest and southwest. There is pine forest to the northeast on Čebulovica Hill. Extensive afforestation has taken place in the area, especially in the 1890s and again after the Second World War. There are many caves in the area. Divača Cave (Divaška jama, depth 89 meters or 292 feet) and Snake Cave (Kačna jama, depth 280 meters or 920 feet) lie southwest of the village. The latter is considered one of the most attractive caves in the world and was named because of the many snakes there.

== Name ==
Divača was attested in written sources in 1499 as Diwatsch. The origin of the name is uncertain, but may derive from *Divaťa (vьsь) (literally, 'Divatъ's village') based on the hypocorism Divatъ or Divata.

== History ==
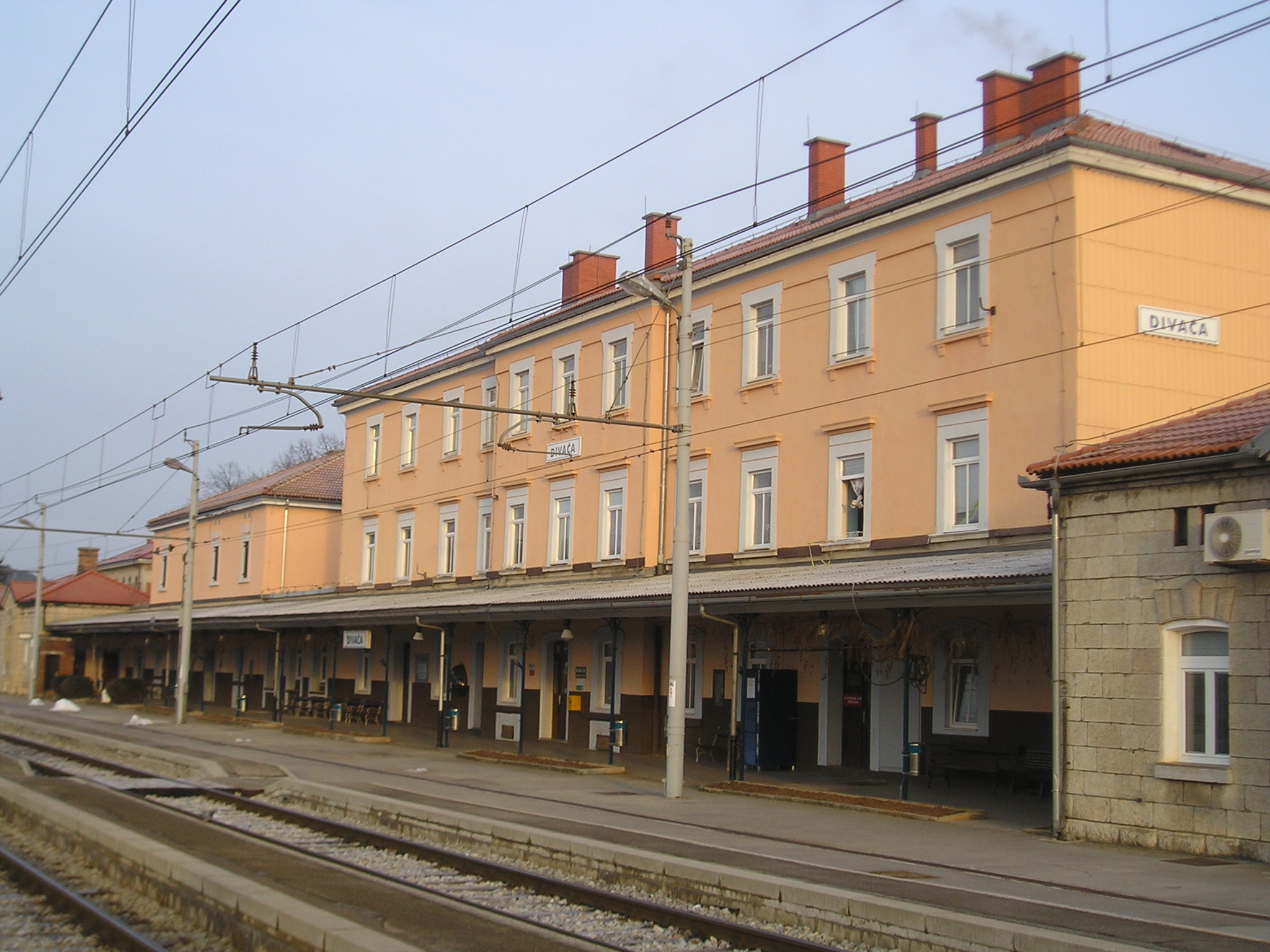
Divača railway station

A tree of heaven plantation stands near the railroad station; it was used to cultivate eri silkworms in the 19th century. A water main was installed for the railroad in 1857, but the town was not connected to the water supply until 1948. Extensive afforestation of abandoned agricultural land took place in the 1890s and before the Second World War. The character of the town changed greatly after the Second World War, with the construction of new apartment buildings, a gym, a public library, stores, and other facilities.

=== Mass grave ===
Divača is the site of one known mass grave from the end of the Second World War. The Snake Cave Mass Grave (Slovene: Grobišče Kačna jama) is located west of the town, near the railway from Ljubljana to Pula. It contains the remains of about 25 people, probably German soldiers, that died at the end of April or beginning of May 1945.

== Church ==
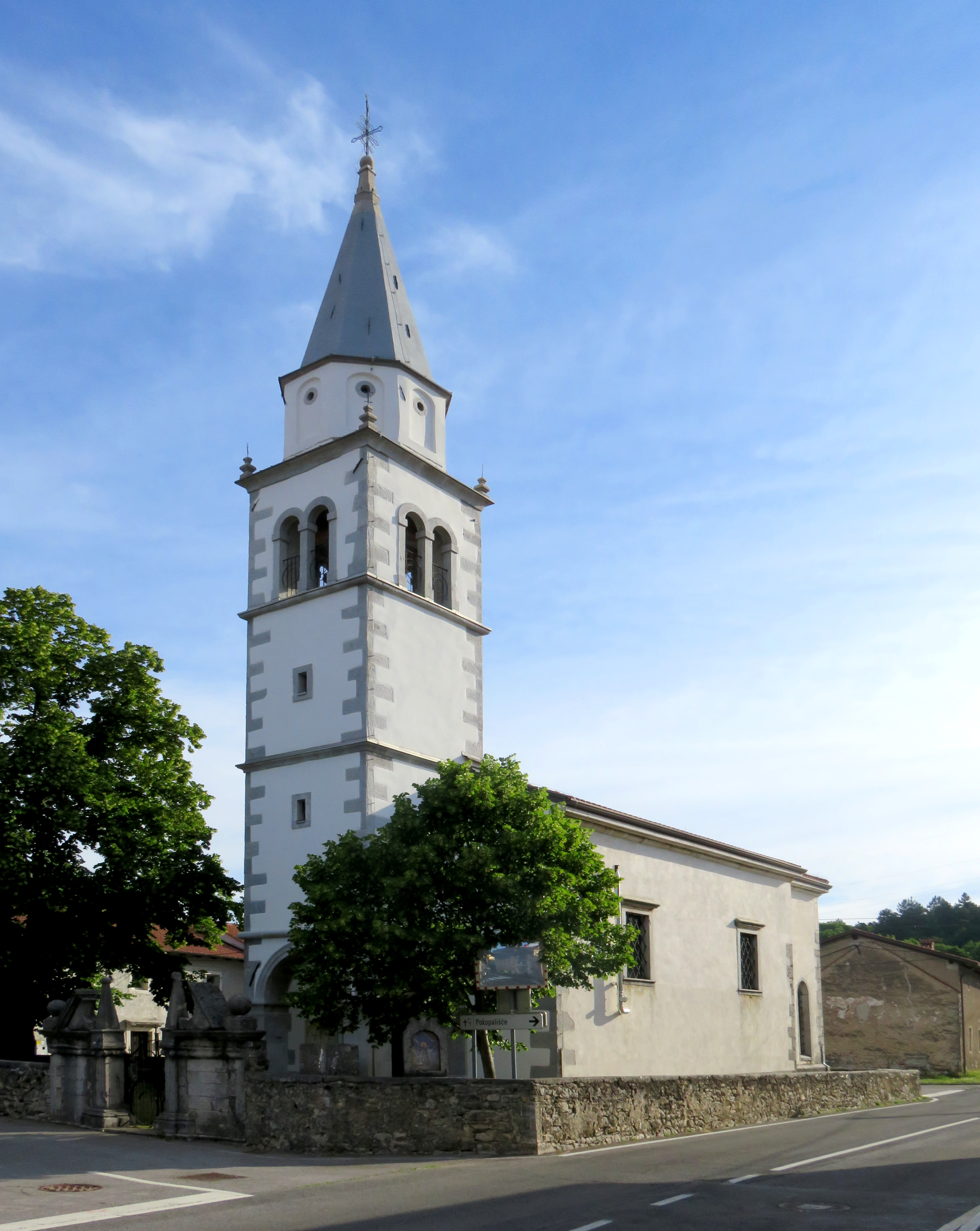
Saint Anthony the Great Church

The parish church in the settlement is dedicated to Saint Anthony the Great and belongs to the Diocese of Koper.

== Transport ==
A referendum in September 2017 approved the government’s plan to build a 27-kilometer (17 mi) railway linking the Adriatic port of Koper with the Divaca railway hub, noted because it is near the border with Italy.

== Notable people ==
Notable people that were born or lived in Divača include:

- Rafael Bačar (1902–1975), biologist and ornithologist
- Metka Bučar (1903–1988), actress
- Dragotin Fatur (1895–1973), architect
- Ita Rina, born Ida Kravanja (1907–1979), actress
- Alojzij Vadnal (1910–1987), mathematician
- Gregor Žiberna (1855–1929), cave explorer
- Jožko Žiberna (1910–2002), lawyer
