= List of railway lines in Croatia =

The following is the list of railways in Croatia as defined by the Government of Croatia in 2014. The classification groups the railways into three groups — the railways of international, regional and local significance.

== Classification of railways significance ==
Railways for international traffic are:

- main (corridor) lines, which are located on international railway corridors and their branches (corridors RH1, RH2 and RH3)
- other lines for international traffic, which within railway hubs and outside them functionally connect the main (corridor) lines or which international sea and river ports and terminals connect with the main (corridor) lines

Railways for regional traffic are lines that in terms of long-distance transport connect:

- railway transport regions in the Republic of Croatia
- railway transport regions in the Republic of Croatia with railways for international traffic
- railway transport regions of neighboring countries with railway transport regions in the Republic of Croatia or with railway lines for international traffic in the Republic of Croatia

Railways for local traffic are:

- railways which connect ports and terminals of non-international importance, as well as industrial zones and economic operators with railways of importance for regional traffic
- railways which, within a particular railway transport region, in terms of local traffic, interconnect certain areas or administrative-economic centers, or connect them to railways for international traffic or to railways for regional traffic
- railways in the function of urban and suburban railways, if at the same time they are not railways for international traffic or railways for regional traffic
- railways which, in terms of local traffic, connect certain local areas in the Republic of Croatia with local areas of neighboring countries
- railways for local connection within railway hubs

Railway number prefixes
| Prefix | Use |
|---|---|
| M | Railways of international significance |
| R | Railways of regional significance |
| L | Railways of local significance |

== Railways of international significance ==
| Rail mark | Full name of the railway | Shortened name | Track length (km) |
|---|---|---|---|
Main (corridor) railways
| M101 | (Dobova) – state border – Savski Marof – Zagreb Main Station | DG – S. Marof – Zagreb GK | 2 X 26.733 |
| M102 | Zagreb Main Station – Dugo Selo | Zagreb GK – Dugo Selo | 2 X 21.198 |
| M103 | Dugo Selo – Novska | Dugo Selo – Novska | 83.405 |
| M104 | Novska – Vinkovci – Tovarnik – state border – (Šid) | Novska – Tovarnik – DG | 2 X 185.405 |
| M201 | (Gyekenyes) – state border – Botovo – Koprivnica – Dugo Selo | DG – Botovo – Dugo Selo | 1 X 58.761 + 2 X 20.948 |
| M202 | Zagreb Main Station – Karlovac – Rijeka | Zagreb GK – Rijeka | 227.871 |
| M303 | Strizivojna-Vrpolje – Slavonski Šamac – state border – (Bosanski Šamac) | S.-Vrpolje – S. Šamac – DG | 23.298 |
| M401 | Sesvete – Sava wye | Sesvete – Sava | 2 X 11.090 |
| M402 | Sava wye – Zagreb Shunting Yard – Zagreb Klara | Sava – Zagreb Klara | 2 X 6.677 |
| M403 | Zagreb Shunting Yard (inbound) – Zagreb Klara (Karlovac track) | Zagreb RkPs – Z. Klara (K) | 1.056 |
| M404 | Zagreb Klara – Delta wye | Zagreb Klara – Delta | 3.575 |
| M405 | Zagreb West Station – Trešnjevka wye | Zagreb ZK – Trešnjevka | 1.317 |
| M406 | Zagreb Borongaj – Zagreb Resnik | Zagreb Bor. – Zagreb Resnik | 2.007 |
| M407 | Sava wye – Velika Gorica | Sava – Velika Gorica | 6.295 |
| M408 | Zagreb Shunting Yard (outbound) – Mićevac wye | Zagreb RkOs – Mićevac | 1.316 |
| M409 | Zagreb Klara (Mlaka) – Zagreb Shunting Yard (inbound, Sisak track) | Z. Klara – Zagreb RkPs (S) | 1.071 |
| M410 | Zagreb Shunting Yard (outbound) – Zagreb Shunting Yard (inbound, 4th bypass track) | Zagreb RkOs – Zagreb RkPs | 2.719 |
| M502-1 | Zagreb Main Station – Velika Gorica | Zagreb GK – Velika Gorica | 14.048 |
| M601 | Vinkovci – Vukovar-Borovo Naselje – Vukovar | Vinkovci – Vukovar | 18.712 |
| M602 | Škrljevo – Bakar | Škrljevo – Bakar | 12.586 |
| M603 | Sušak-Pećine – Rijeka Brajdica | Sušak – Rijeka Brajdica | 3.802 |
Other railways for international traffic
| M203 | Rijeka – Šapjane – state border – (Ilirska Bistrica) | Rijeka – Šapjane – DG | 30.896 |
| M301 | (Magyarboly) – state border – Beli Manastir – Osijek | DG – B. Manastir – Osijek | 32.505 |
| M302 | Osijek – Đakovo – Strizivojna-Vrpolje | Osijek – Strizivojna-Vrpolje | 48.377 |
| M304 | (Čapljina) – state border – Metković – Ploče | DG – Metković – Ploče | 22.740 |
| M501 | (Središće) – state border – Čakovec – Kotoriba – state border – (Murakeresztur) | DG – Čakovec – Kotoriba – DG | 42.388 |
| M502-2 | Velika Gorica – Sisak – Novska | V. Gorica – Sisak – Novska | 102.743 |
| M604 | Oštarije – Gospić – Knin – Split | Oštarije – Knin – Split | 1 X 318,483 + 2 X 3,616 |
| M605 | Ogulin – Krpelj wye | Ogulin – Krpelj | 6.153 |
| M606 | Knin – Zadar | Knin – Zadar | 95.364 |
| M607 | Perković – Šibenik | Perković – Šibenik | 22.503 |
Source: Narodne novine

== Railways of regional significance ==
| Rail mark | Full name of railway | Shortened name of railway | Construction track length (km) |
|---|---|---|---|
| R101 | (Podgorje) – state border – Buzet – Pazin – Pula | DG – Buzet – Pula | 91.140 |
| R102 | Sunja – Volinja – state border – (Dobrljin) | Sunja – Volinja – DG | 21.575 |
| R103 | (Martin Brod) – dividing line at km 119+444 (Note: National railway authorities do not correspond to state borders in this instance. See Bosnia and Herzegovina–Croatia relations § Una river.) – state border – Ličko Dugo Polje – Knin | DG – L. D. Polje – Knin | 59.068 |
| R104 | Vukovar-Borovo Naselje – Dalj – Erdut – state border – (Bogojevo) | Vukovar-B.n. – Erdut – DG | 26.046 |
| R105 | Vinkovci – Drenovci – state border – (Brčko) | Vinkovci – Drenovci – DG | 50.939 |
| R106 | Zabok – Krapina – Đurmanec – state border – (Rogatec) | Zabok – Đurmanec – DG | 27.198 |
| R201 | Zaprešić – Zabok – Varaždin – Čakovec | Zaprešić – Čakovec | 100.714 |
| R202 | Varaždin – Koprivnica – Virovitica – Osijek – Dalj | Varaždin – Dalj | 249.847 |
Source: Narodne novine

== Railways of local significance ==
| Rail mark | Full name of railway | Shortened name of railway | Construction track length (km) |
|---|---|---|---|
| L101 | Čakovec – Mursko Središće – state border – (Lendava) | Čakovec – M. Središće – DG | 17.942 |
| L102 | Savski Marof – Kumrovec – state border – (Imeno) | S. Marof – Kumrovec – DG | 38.522 |
| L103 | Karlovac – Ozalj – Kamanje – state border – (Metlika) | Karlovac – Kamanje – DG | 28.799 |
| L201 | Varaždin – Ivanec – Golubovec | Varaždin – Golubovec | 34.596 |
| L202 | Hum-Lug wye – Gornja Stubica | Hum-Lug – Gornja Stubica | 10.820 |
| L203 | Križevci – Bjelovar – Kloštar | Križevci – Bjelovar – Kloštar | 62.047 |
| L204 | Banova Jaruga – Daruvar – Pčelić wye | Banova Jaruga – Pčelić | 95.752 |
| L205 | Nova Kapela-Batrina – Pleternica – Našice | Nova Kapela – Našice | 60.493 |
| L206 | Pleternica – Požega – Velika | Pleternica – Velika | 24.955 |
| L207 | Bizovac – Belišće | Bizovac – Belišće | 12.940 |
| L208 | Vinkovci – Gaboš – Osijek | Vinkovci – Osijek | 33.770 |
| L209 | Vinkovci – Županja | Vinkovci – Županja | 28.073 |
| L210 | Sisak Caprag – Petrinja | Sisak Caprag – Petrinja | 11.018 |
| L211 | Ražine – Port of Šibenik | Ražine – Port of Šibenik | 3.714 |
| L212 | Rijeka Brajdica – Rijeka | Rijeka Brajdica – Rijeka | 2.037 |
| L213 | Lupoglav – Raša | Lupoglav – Raša | 52.996 |
| L214 | Gradec – Sveti Ivan Žabno | Gradec – Sv. I. Žabno | 12.520 |
Source: Narodne novine

== See also ==
- Rail transport in Croatia
