= R202 railway (Croatia) =

Railway line in Croatia

Varaždin–Dalj railway

Overview
- Line number: R202 (HŽ)

Technical
- Line length: 249.8 km (155.2 mi)
- Track gauge: 1435 mm
- Operating speed: 100 km/h (62.1 mph) max.

The Varaždin–Dalj railway, officially designated as the R202 railway, is a 249.839-kilometre (155.243 mi) long railway line in Croatia that spanning between the city of Varaždin and the town of Dalj east of Osijek. It is non-electrified and mostly single-tracked.

The R202 railway connects to several other lines. In Varaždin, at the western terminus of the line, the railway connects to the R201 spanning between Čakovec, just to the north, and Zaprešić near Zagreb. The L201, serving Ivanec and Golubovec, is also connected to the R202 in Varaždin. The R202 also connects to the M201 linking Budapest (via Gyékényes) and Zagreb (via Dugo Selo) at Koprivnica and to the L204 to Bjelovar at Kloštar Podravski. The L205 and L206 railways connect to the R202 at Pčelić and Našice respectively. Nonetheless, sections of the L205 and L206 adjacent to the R202 are not used as of 2013. The L208 joins the R202 at Bizovac and serves Belišće. In Osijek, the R202 connects to the M301 to Budapest (via Beli Manastir), M302 to Strizivojna-Vrpolje junction, and the L209 to Vinkovci. At the eastern terminus of the R202, in Dalj, the railway connects to the R104 serving Vukovar to the south and Subotica via Erdut to the east.

== Gallery ==
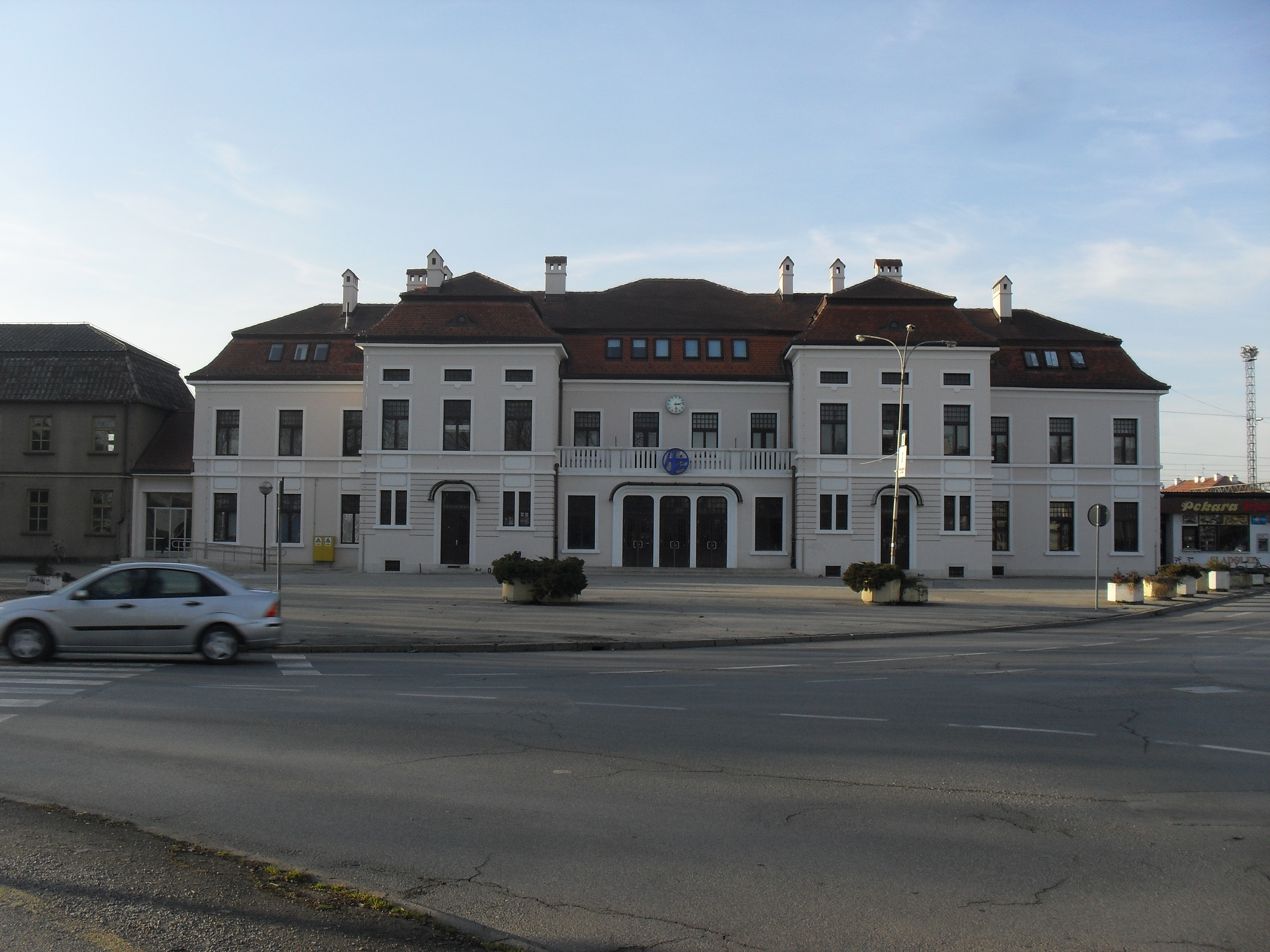
Koprivnica station

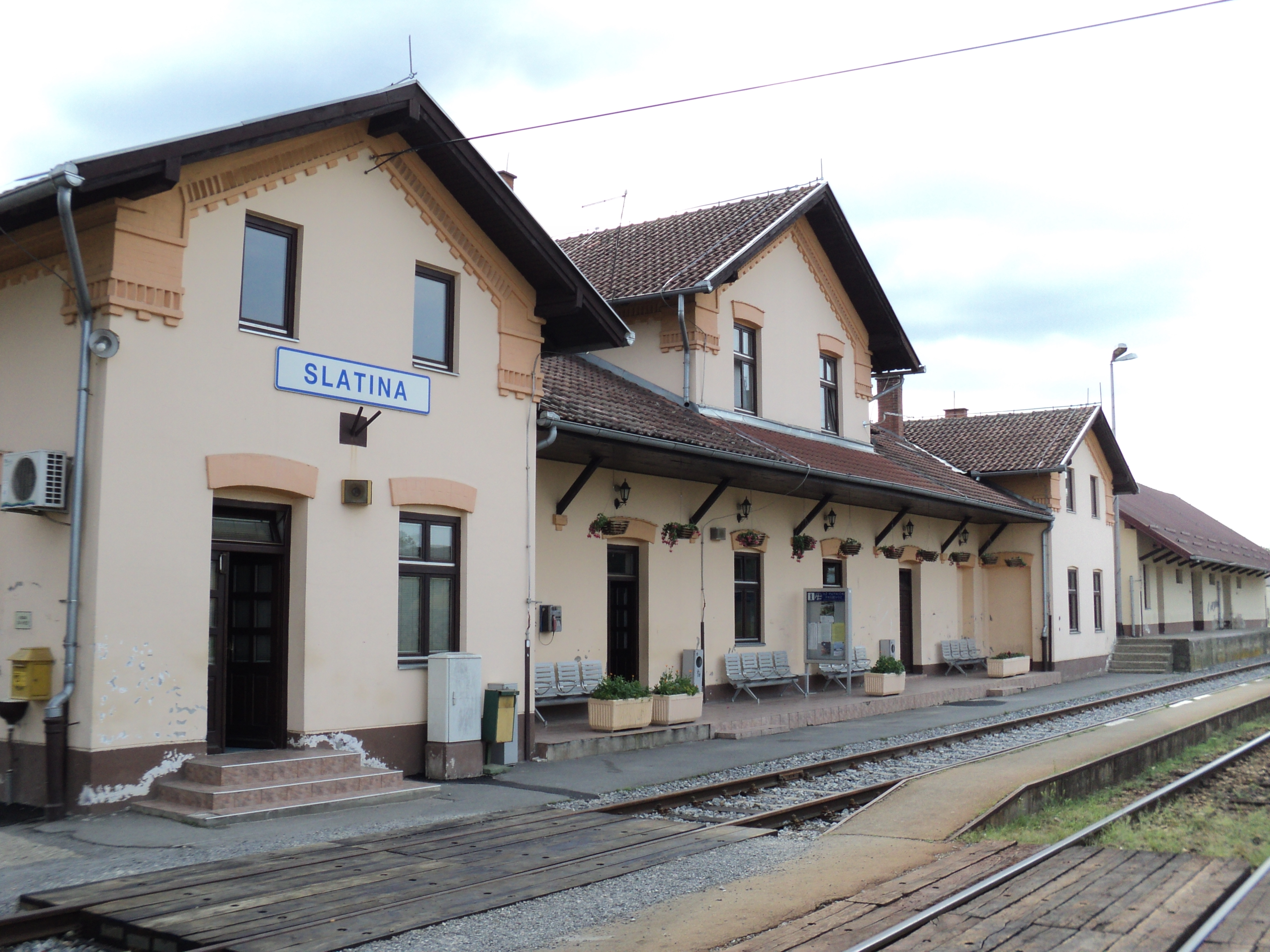
Slatina, Croatia station

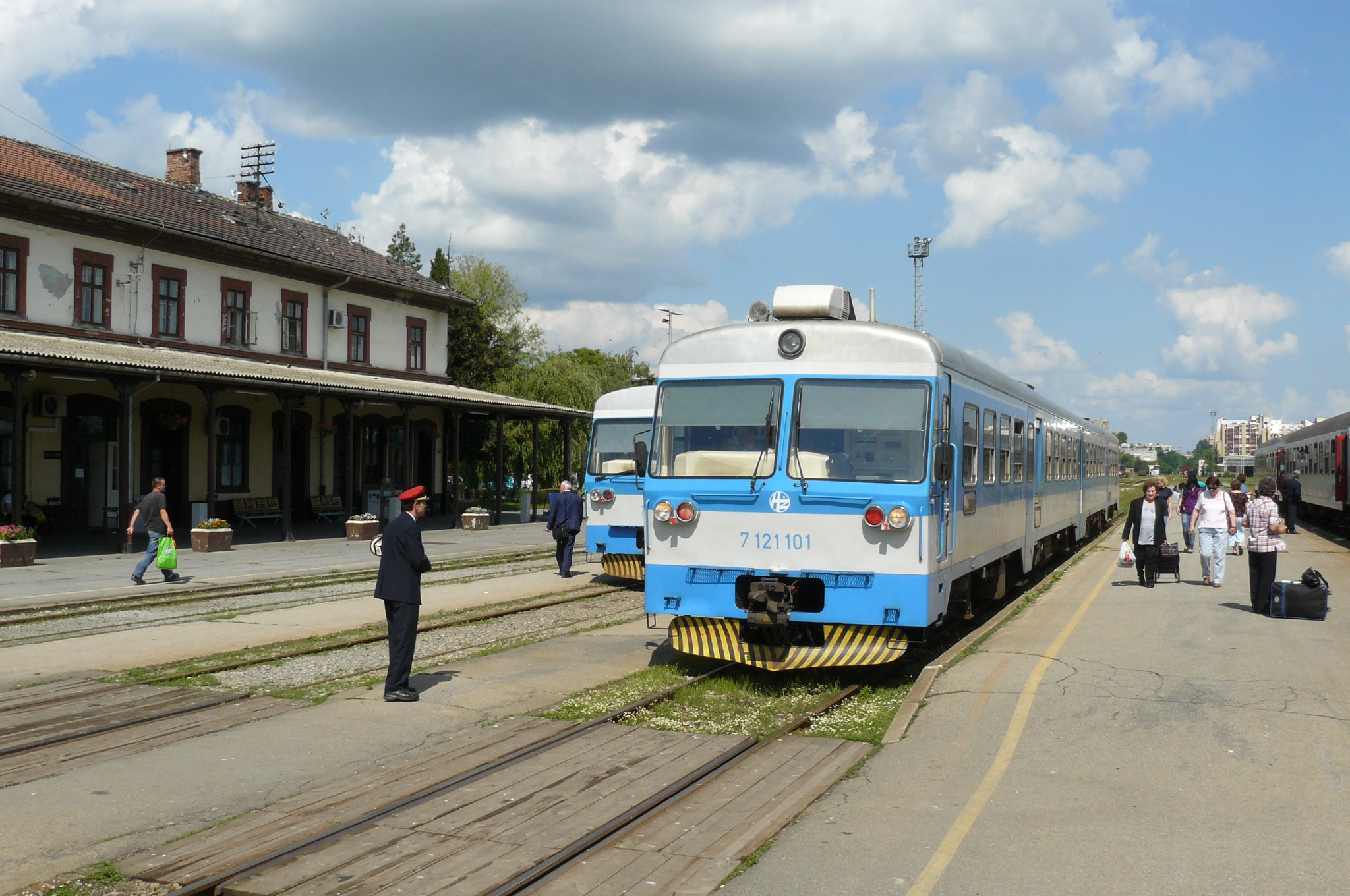
Osijek station

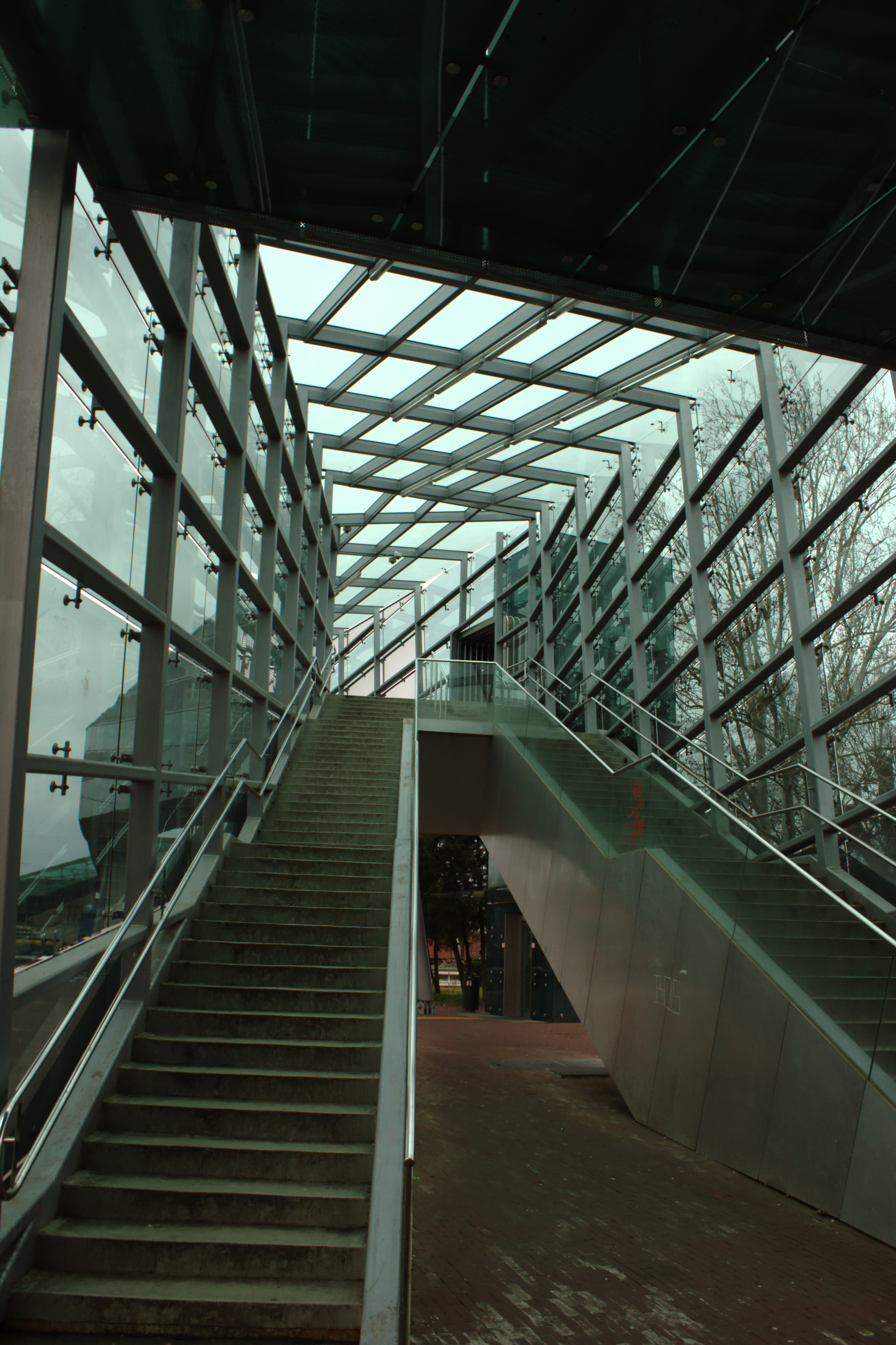
Osijek pedestrian overpass
