= M502 railway (Croatia) =

Railway line in Croatia

Zagreb–Sisak–Novska railway
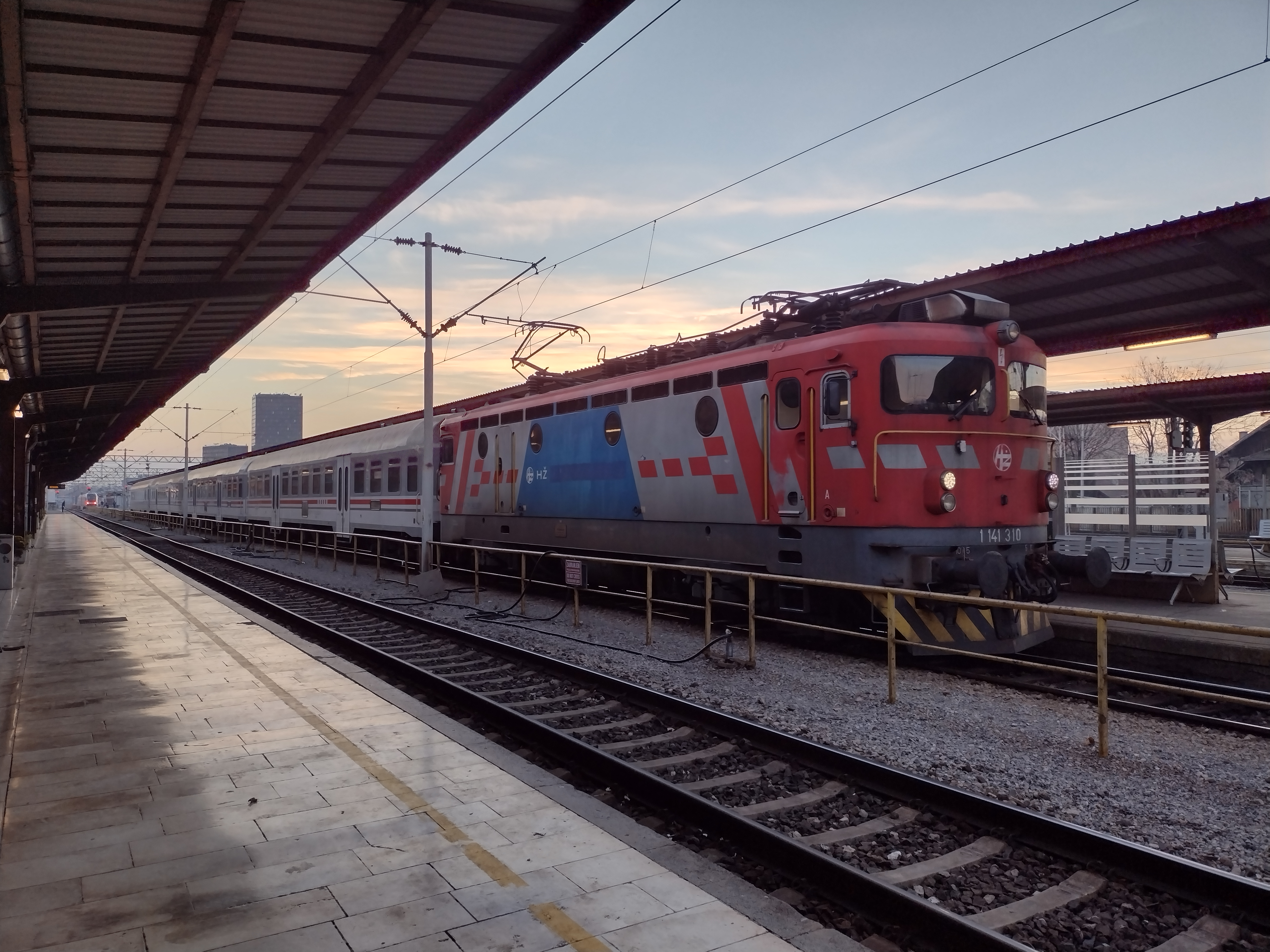
- HŽ Train in Zagreb Glavni kolodvor, on its route Zagreb - Sisak - Novska

Technical
- Line length: 116.8 km (72.6 mi)
- Track gauge: 1435 mm
- Electrification: 25 kV 50 Hz AC
- Operating speed: 60 to 140 km/h (37 to 87 mph) max.

The Zagreb Glavni kolodvor–Sisak–Novska railway, officially designated the M502 railway is a 116.8-kilometre (72.6 mi) railway line in Croatia connecting Zagreb to Sisak and Novska. Until 2014, the railway was classified as M104.

The railway connects to the M101 and M202 lines at Zagreb Glavni kolodvor, the R102 at Sunja, and the M103 (to Zagreb via Dugo Selo) and the M104 to Vinkovci and Belgrade at the eastern terminus, Novska.

The M502 railway is electrified using a 25 kV 50 Hz AC overhead line system and it is single-tracked. The maximum speed along the line varies between 140 km/h (87 mph) and 60 km/h (37 mph).

The line is used for passenger (mainly commuter/regional) and freight traffic.

== History ==
=== Construction and Development ===
The Croatian Railway Project from Agram (now Zagreb) to Sissek (now Sisak) was started in 1855 by the Austrian Southern Railway Company as a connection to the Southern Railway. In 1860, the route for Sissek was selected due to the importance of the railway between the Sava and the Lower Danube. In order to achieve the most advantageous incline and curvature, the railway line was designed in such a way that no major infrastructure was required beyond the Sava bridge. On 1 October 1862 the Agram–Sissek section was opened to the public with the Steinburg (now Zidani Most) –Agram section.

After the end of the First World War, the line became part of the railways of the Kingdom of Serbs, Croats and Slovenes, the Železnice Kraljevine SHS, renamed the Jugoslavenske Državne Železnice (JDŽ) in 1929.

=== Reconstruction of the Greda - Sunja section (2018 - 2022) ===
From 2018 to 2022, entire 30 km (18.6 mi) long section between Greda and Sunja was reconstructed. With the renovation of the railway section, the technical conditions for increasing the speed have been ensured, so on the railway section Greda - Sisak TK, the maximum permitted speed has been raised to 140 km/h, and on the section Sisak Caprag - Sunja to 120 km/h.

As part of the project, a complete renovation of the upper track structure was carried out. Work was also carried out on the harmonization and restoration of the electric power, traffic management and signal-safety infrastructure subsystem, as well as on the harmonization and adaptation of other functional parts of the railway. New platforms were built at the Stupno and Brđani Krajiški stops, and 13 railway and road crossings were arranged with synthetic and wooden surfaces.

== Gallery ==
Zagreb Central Station

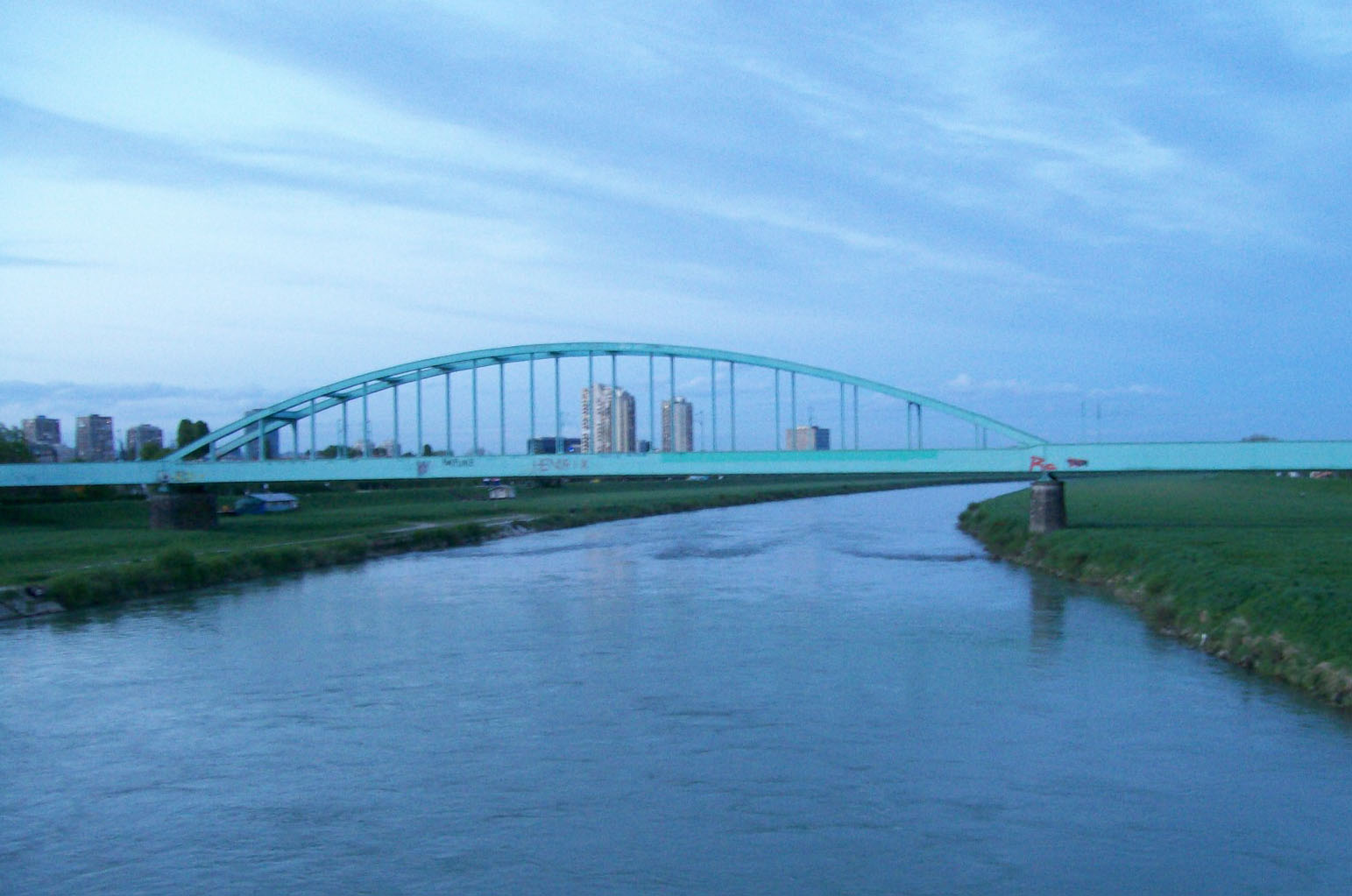
Sava river bridge

== See also ==
- List of railways in Croatia
