= Zagreb Glavni kolodvor =

Railway station in Zagreb, Croatia

Zagreb Glavni Kolodvor
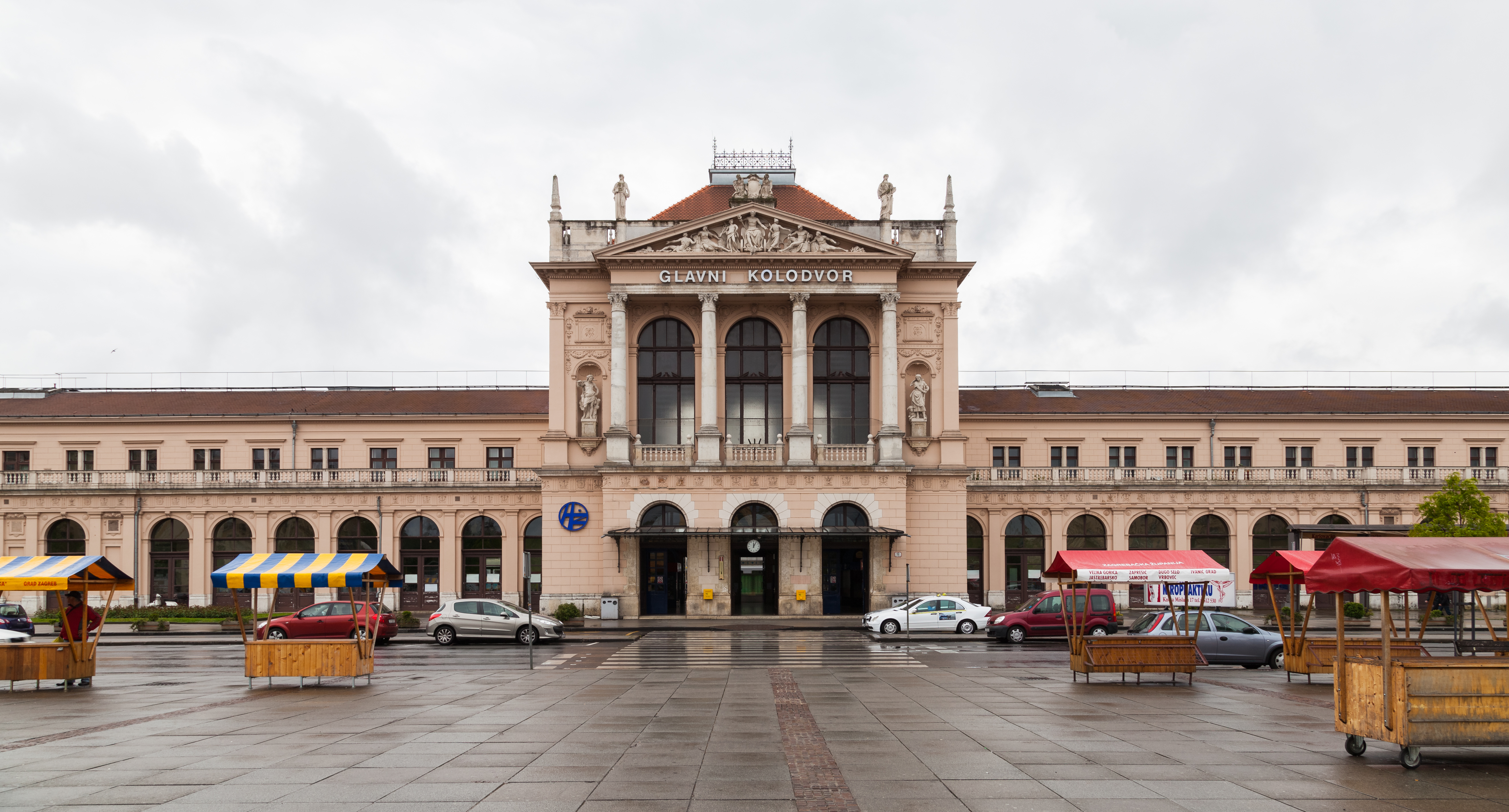
- Main entrance

General information
- Location: Trg kralja Tomislava 12, Zagreb, Lower Town; Croatia
- Coordinates: 45°48′17″N 15°58′44″E
- Lines: M101 to Ljubljana; M102 to Vinkovci and Koprivnica via Dugo Selo; M104 to Vinkovci via Sisak; M201 to Botovo via Dugo Selo; M202 to Rijeka; M502 to Novska via Velika Gorica; M604 to Split via Gospić and Knin
- Platforms: 7
- Tracks: 9
- Connections: see list

History
- Opened: 1892; 134 years ago
- Rebuilt: 1987
- Electrified: 1970 (25 kV 50 Hz AC to Belgrade and 3 kV DC to Rijeka); 1985 (25 kV 50 Hz AC to Rijeka)

Passengers
- 70,000/day

Services
| Preceding station | Croatian Railways | Following station |
|---|---|---|
| Dobova towards Zürich HB or Stuttgart Hbf | EuroNight | Terminus |

Cultural Good of Croatia
- Type: Cultural
Location

Zagreb Glavni kolodvor (Croatian for Zagreb main station) is the main railway station in Zagreb, Croatia. Located 1 km (0.62 mi) south of the city's main square, it is the largest station in Croatia and the main hub of the Croatian Railways network.

Zagreb Main Railway Station was built by Hungarian architect Ferenc Pfaff and officially opened on 18 August 1892 and has remained the city's principal passenger railway station ever since. In the early 2010s, the station handled approximately 2.6 million passengers annually, while modernization of its signalling and safety systems was undertaken with co-financing from the European Union.

== History ==
=== Planning ===
An 1890 act of the Royal Hungarian Government authorised the building of the main station and maintenance shop in Zagreb, in response to the rapid expansion of railway traffic following the opening of the continuous railway line between Budapest and Rijeka in 1873 and the growth of the railway network converging on Zagreb. Urban planners selected an undeveloped area south of the historic city centre, between the extensions of today's Preradovićeva and Petrinjska streets, as the site for the new station complex. The City of Zagreb donated approximately 25 hectares of land, while construction was financed by the Hungarian State Railways (MÁV). Legislation authorized the construction of the station—originally known as Zagreb State Railway Station (Zagreb Državni kolodvor) by the Croatian-Hungarian Parliament on 15 January 1890 and confirmed by Emperor and King Franz Joseph I on 31 March 1890.

The station's design was selected from approximately thirty proposals and construction of the 186.5 m (612 ft) long station building began in 1891 and was overseen by Hungarian architect Ferenc Pfaff, one of the leading railway architects employed by MÁV. The building follows the principles of Neoclassical architecture, characterized by a symmetrical composition, accentuated central and end sections, carefully designed decorative elements, allegorical sculptures above the main entrance, and an emphasis on functional organization. Sculptural works were undertaken by the Hungarian sculptor Vilim Marschenko.

=== Construction ===
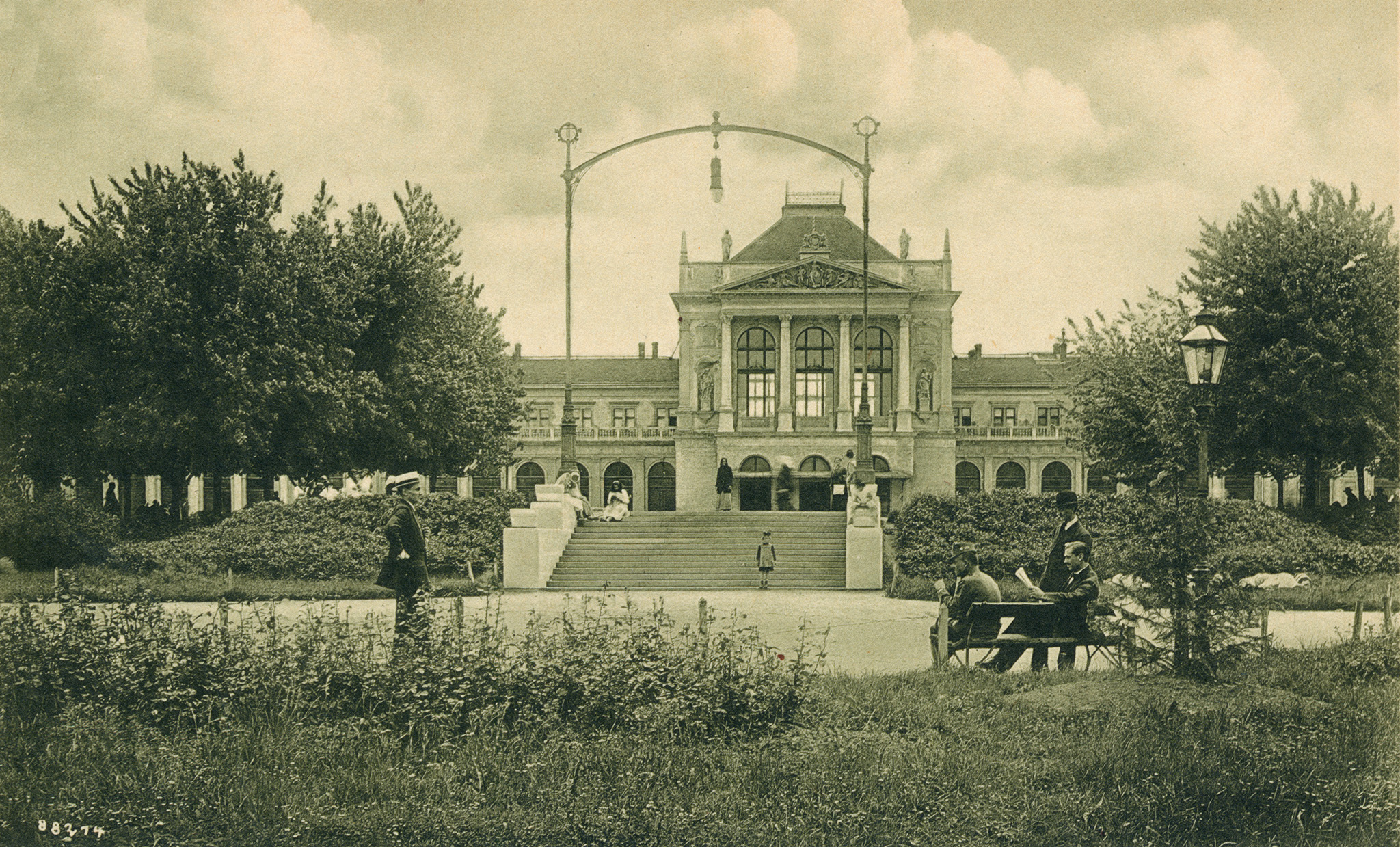
Zagreb Main Railway Station, 1912

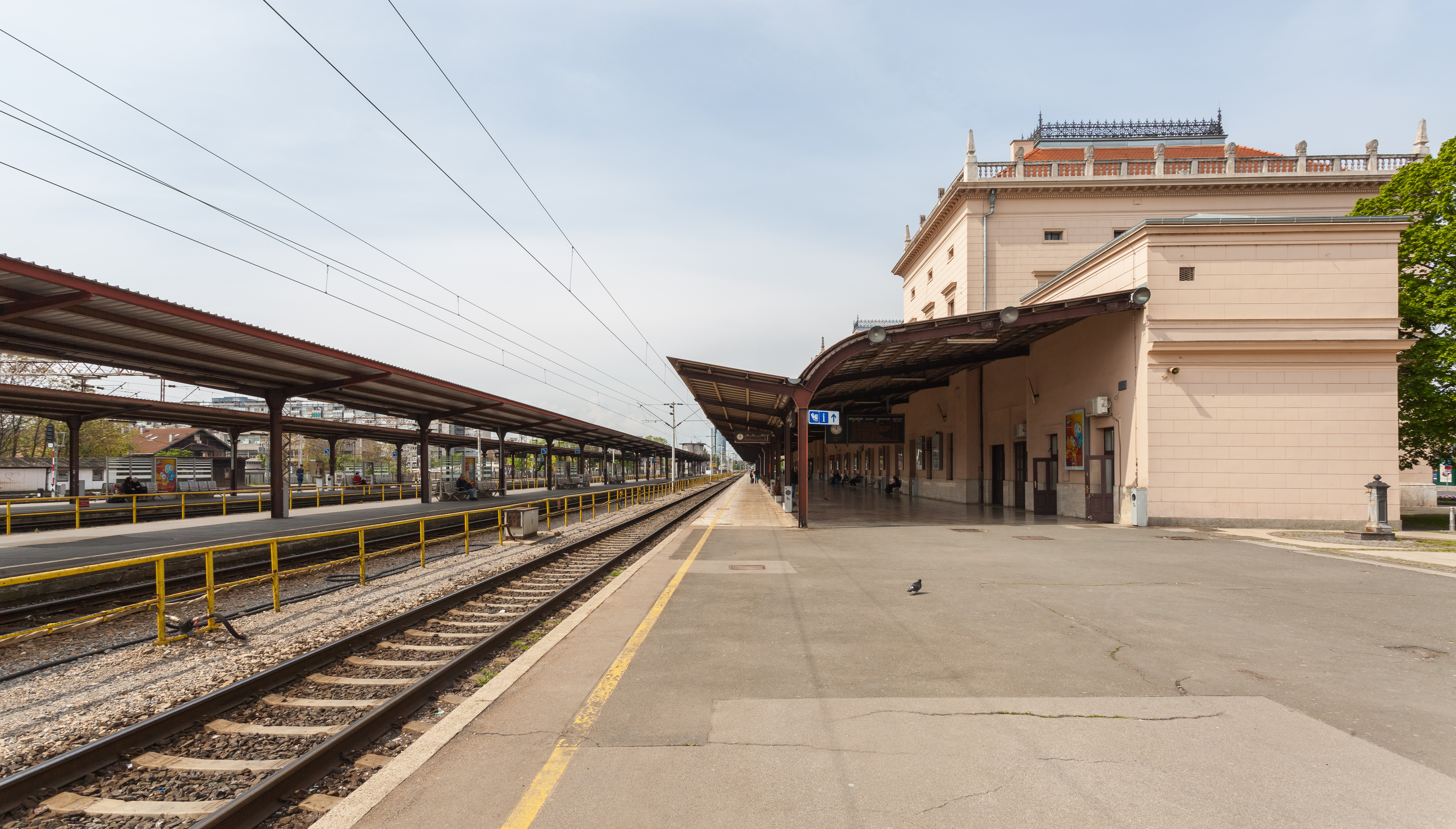
Train Platform

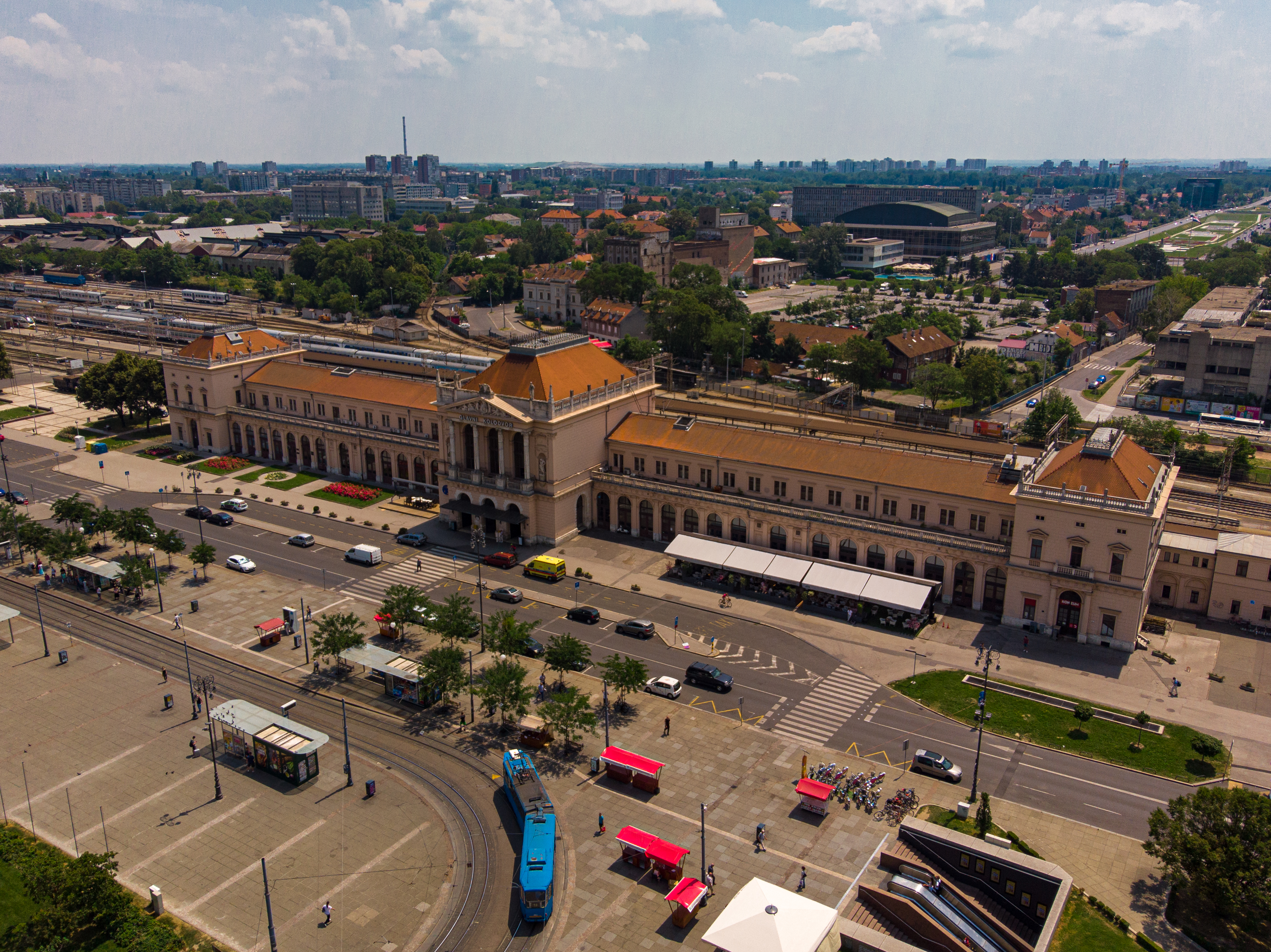
Aerial view of the station

The construction of the new station formed part of a broader programme of urban development in Zagreb. Associated infrastructure projects included the establishment of the Zagreb Botanical Garden, construction of a post office building east of the station (demolished in 1949), introduction of tram services connecting the station with Ban Jelačić Square, construction of a pedestrian bridge linking the northern and southern parts of the city (demolished in 1979), establishment of the MÁV locomotive workshops in 1894 (today's Gredelj railway works), and construction of a direct railway connection toward Karlovac, eliminating the need for trains bound for Rijeka and Nova Gradiška to use Zagreb South Station.

The reception building measures 186.5 m (612 ft) in length. Originally, the southern side accommodated three platform tracks, with only the first platform covered by a canopy. Construction of the station building, locomotive depot, and associated facilities involved fourteen Croatian and Hungarian companies. The station opened on 1 July 1892 and was named Državni kolodvor Zagreb (State Station Zagreb). The station entered trial operation on 1 July 1892 and was officially inaugurated on 18 August 1892, coinciding with the birthday of Emperor Franz Joseph I. Following the opening ceremony, the first departing train left for Rijeka at 10:35 a.m. The station's first stationmaster was János Matota. It is one of the largest public buildings built in 19th century Zagreb.

=== 20th/21st century ===
The first major expansion of Zagreb Main Railway Station after its completion took place in 1922, when six additional station tracks were constructed. In 1936, the station underwent further enlargement with the construction of new covered platforms and underground passenger passages, reconstruction of Platform 1, and extension of the eastern wing of the reception building. As part of the modernization of the station's infrastructure, a signal box was built near Koturaška Road, and a Siemens & Halske-type VES electromechanical interlocking system was installed, introducing centralized railway traffic control.

During the 1950s, the station expanded eastwards with the construction of Platform VI in 1952, additional storage tracks in 1956, and completion of the second railway track between Zagreb and Dugo Selo in 1959. Further reconstruction of the track layout, electrification of the station and connecting railway lines, and modernization of operational facilities continued in the following decades. In 1981, part of the station's façade was restored. Reconstruction works were undertaken in 1986–87 (just before the 1987 Summer Universiade) and again in 2006.

In 2006, Zagreb Main Railway Station recorded a total of 27,325,000 passengers, the highest annual figure in its history.

To mark the station's 120th anniversary in 2012, a historical exhibition was installed in the main vestibule, presenting the development and architectural significance of the station. A philatelic exhibition featuring stamps and postal material depicting the station throughout its history was also displayed. At the time of the anniversary, approximately 312 passenger trains served the station daily. Around 82,000 passengers passed through the station each day, while approximately 2.6 million passengers departed from the station during 2011.

Zagreb Main Railway Station is a protected cultural monument of Croatia and remains the country's principal passenger railway station. Although its architectural heritage has been preserved through restoration, its role within Zagreb's transport network has been described as underutilized, with expectations that its importance will increase through the expansion of international rail services and the development of an integrated regional public transport system.

== International Lines ==
- EC 158/159 CROATIA: Zagreb – Graz – Vienna Hbf (through Maribor)
- 204/201 AGRAM: Zagreb – Budapest Déli (through Koprivnica)
- 210/211 SAVA: Villach – Zagreb – Vinkovci
- EC 212/213 MIMARA: Zagreb – Villach (– Frankfurt Hbf)
- 412/413: Zagreb – Belgrade
- IC 310/311: Zagreb – Villach
- 414/415: Belgrade – Zagreb – Schwarzach im Pongau (- Zürich Hbf)
- EN 498/499 LISINSKI: Zagreb – Ljubljana – München Hbf.

== Public transport ==
Directly in front of the main railway station, there is a stop for Zagreb tram lines 2, 4, 6, 9 and 13. They are operated by the Zagreb Electric Tram (ZET). With lines 2 and 6 it is possible to reach the Bus station, which is three stops away and from which many buses travel to larger and smaller cities in Croatia and neighboring countries.

== Incidents ==
=== 1974 Train disaster ===
On 30 August 1974, the station was the site of the deadliest train accident in Yugoslavia at the time, with 153 people dead. The incident occurred when a train from Belgrade headed for Dortmund derailed at the entrance of the station.

== Gallery ==
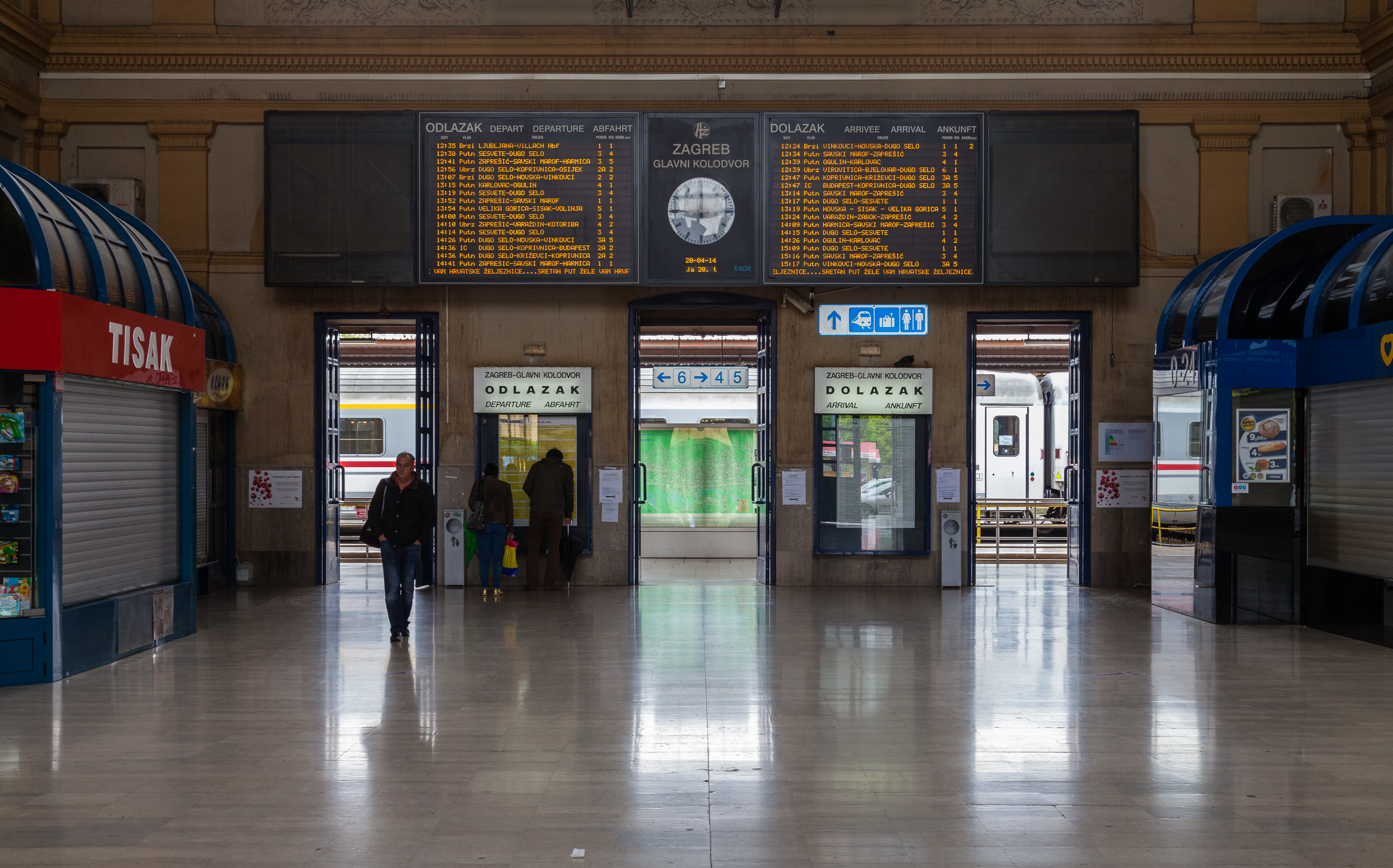
Interior

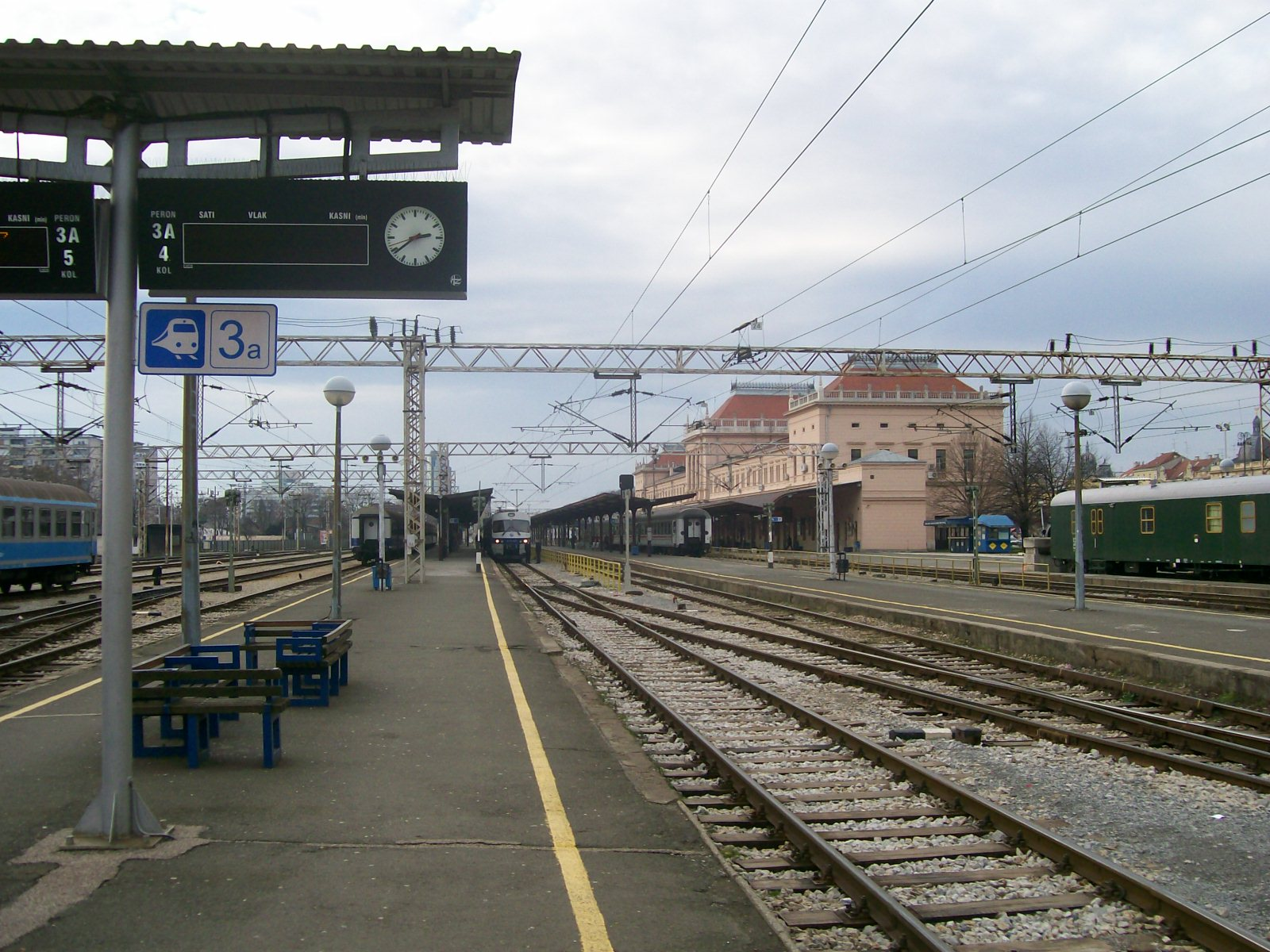
A view of the platforms from the east

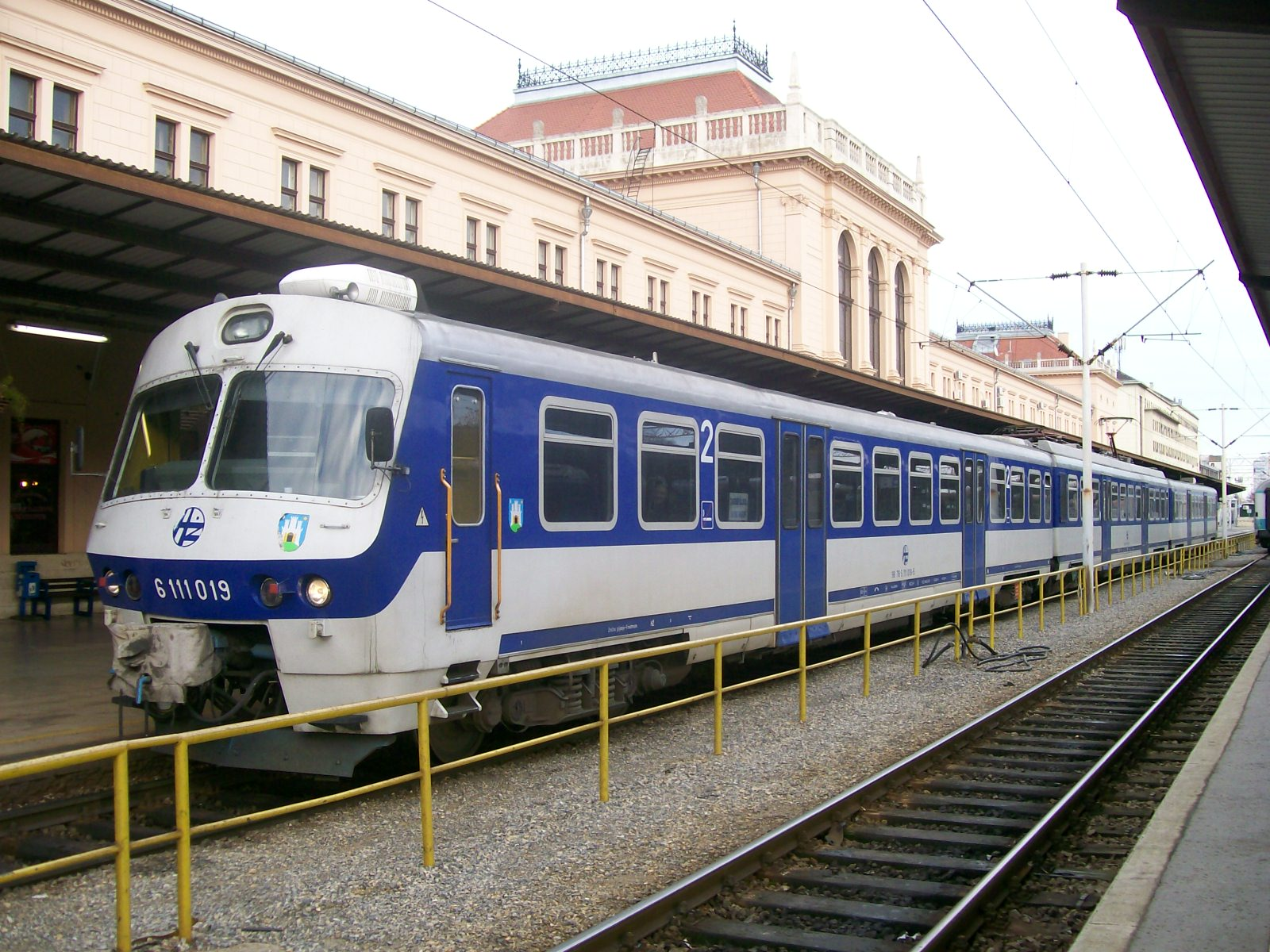
HŽ series 6111 inter-urban train at a platform

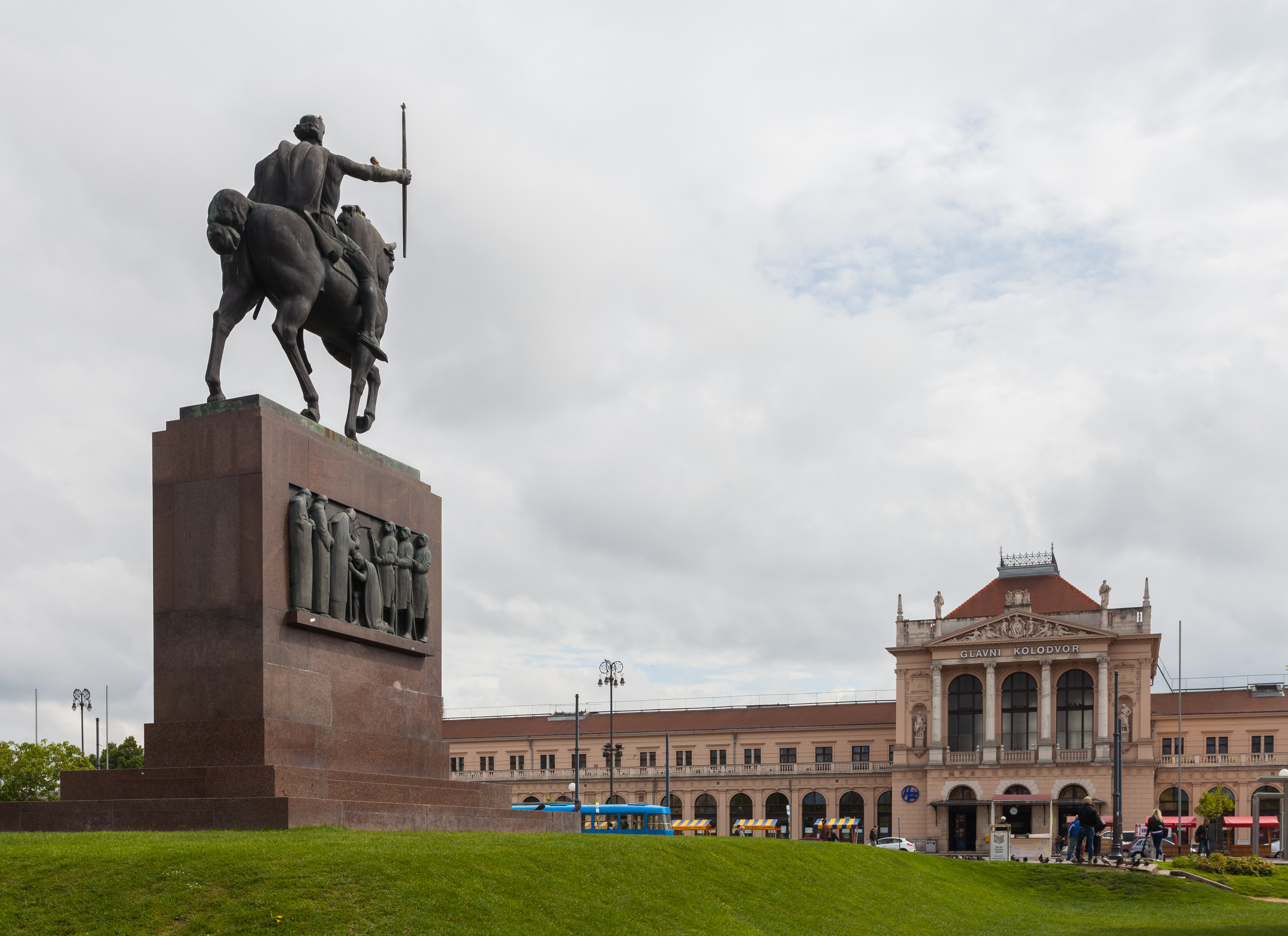
Statue of King Tomislav in front of the railway station

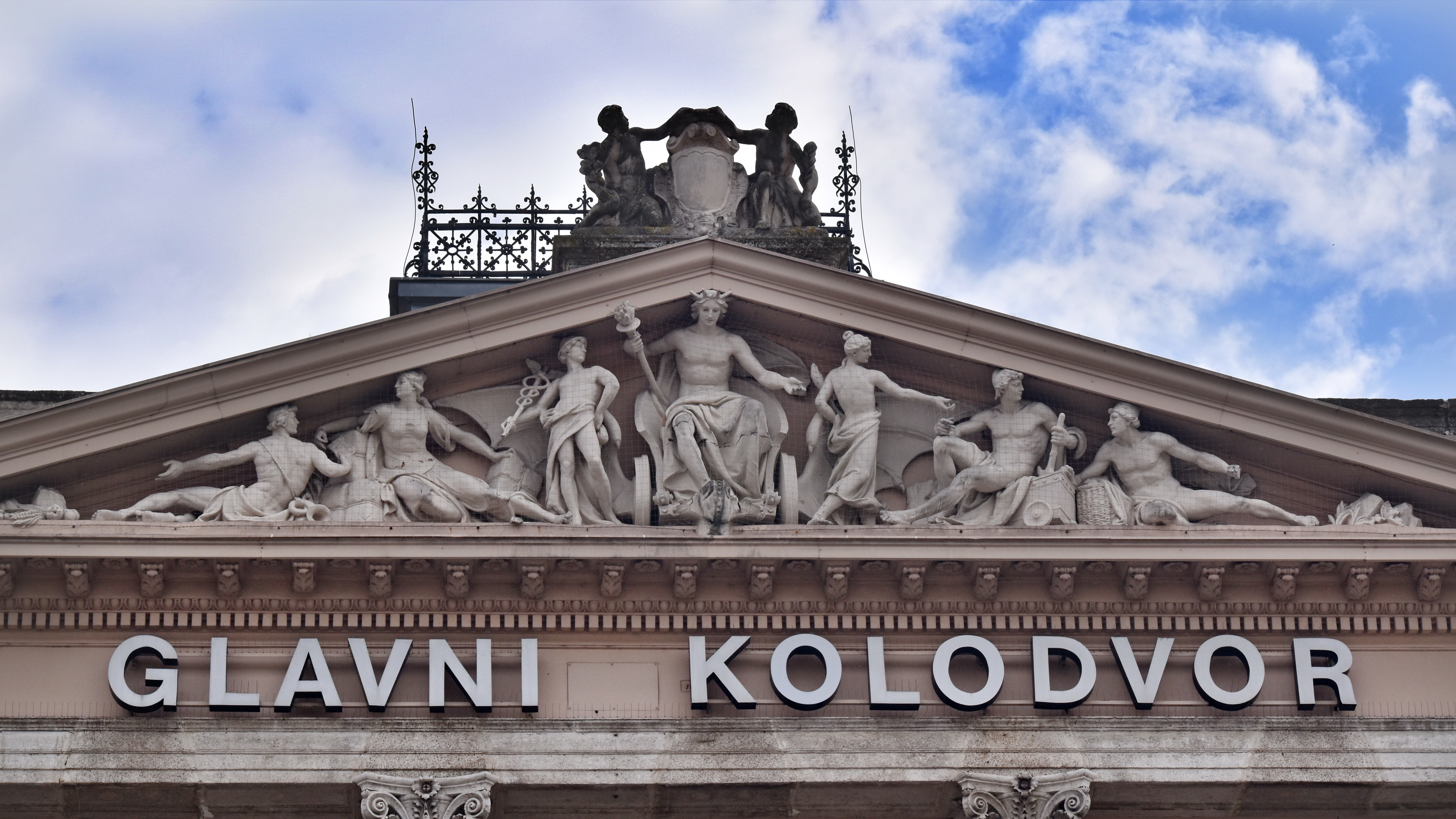
Details of statues of Neoclassicism

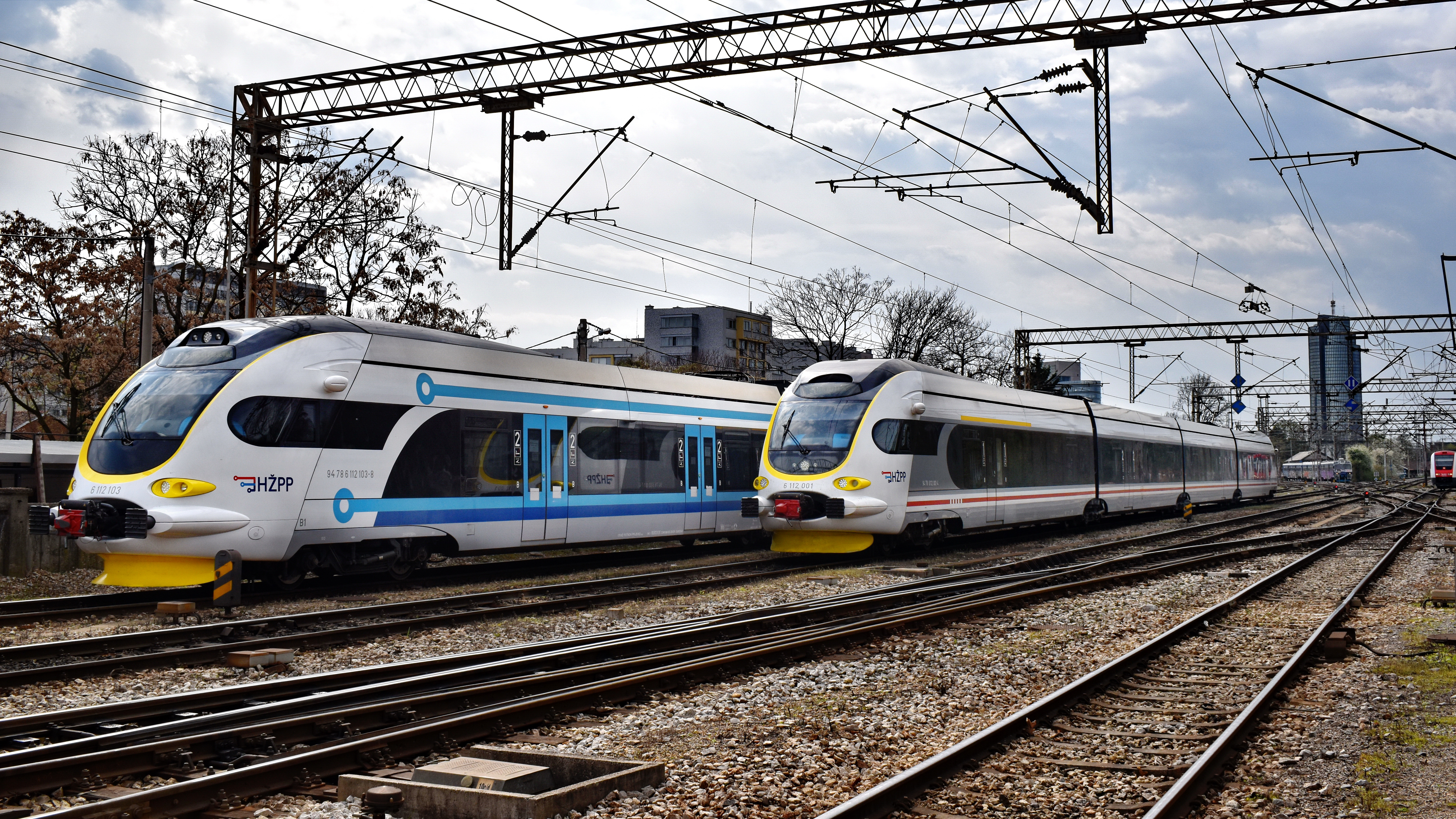
HŽ series 6112 manufactured by the Croatian company Končar Group, operated by Croatian Railways.

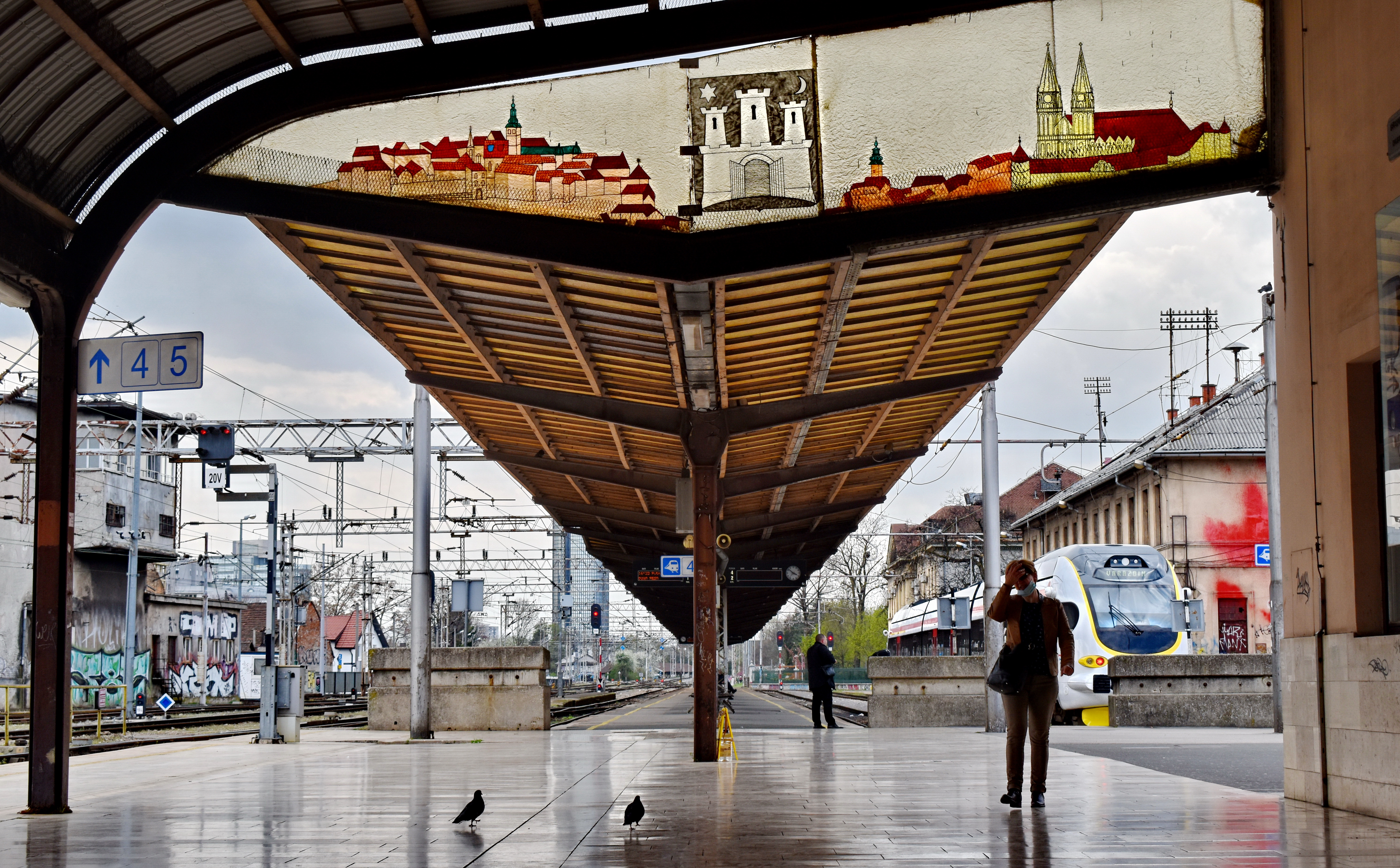
Railway platform view

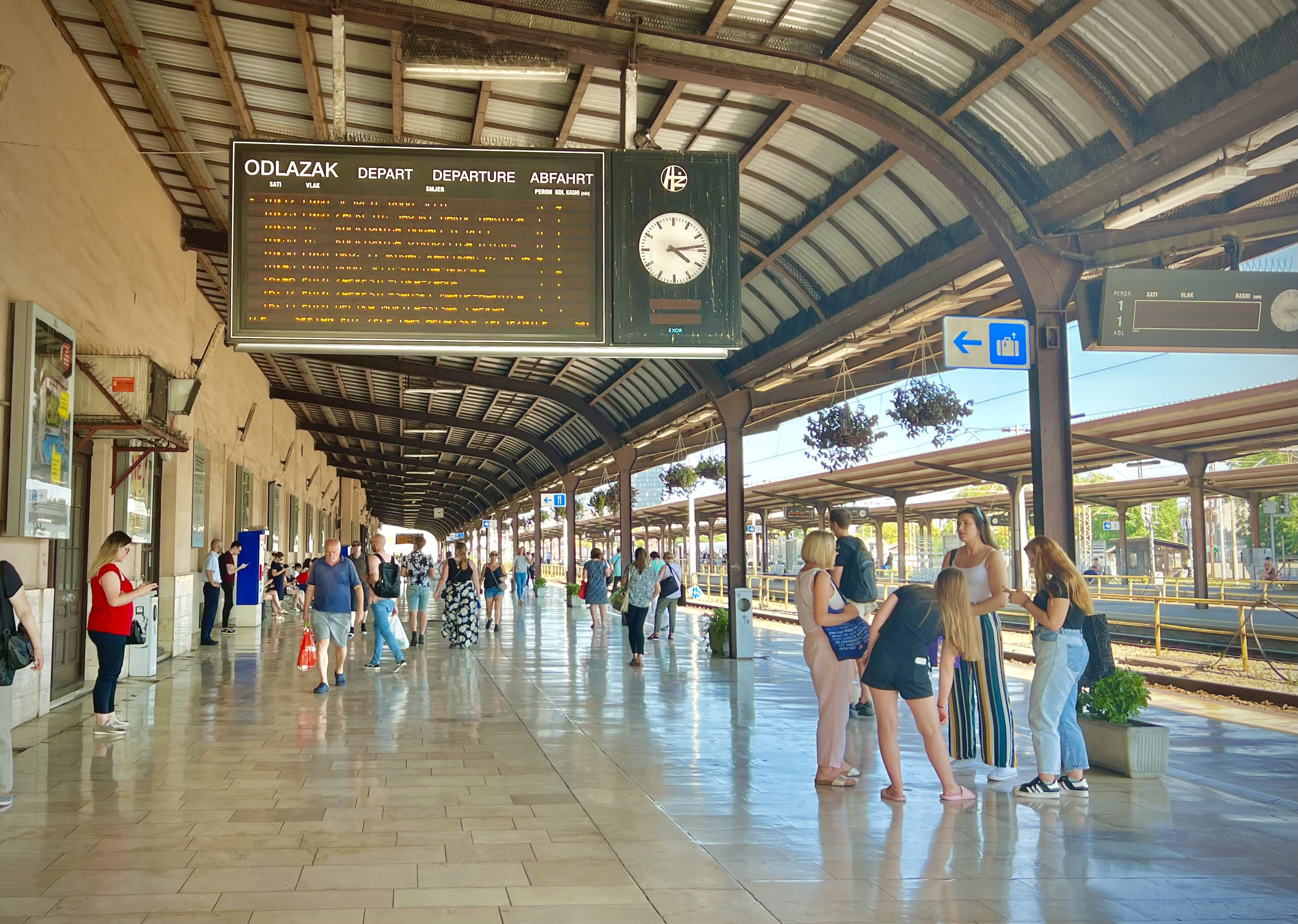
Waiting area

== See also ==
- Zagreb train disaster (1974)
- Zagreb Zapadni railway station
