= Lipovljani railway station =

Railway station in Croatia

Coordinates: 45°23′12″N 16°52′57″E

Lipovljani

General information
- Location: Croatia
- Tracks: 4
Location

Lipovljani railway station (Croatian: Željeznička stanica Lipovljani) is a railway station on Dugo Selo–Novska railway in Croatia. Located in Lipovljani. Railroad continued to Banova Jaruga in one and the other direction to Novska. Lipovljani railway station consists of 4 railway track.

== See also ==
- Croatian Railways
- Zagreb–Belgrade railway
