= M101 railway (Croatia) =

Railway line in Croatia

Savski Marof–Zagreb railway
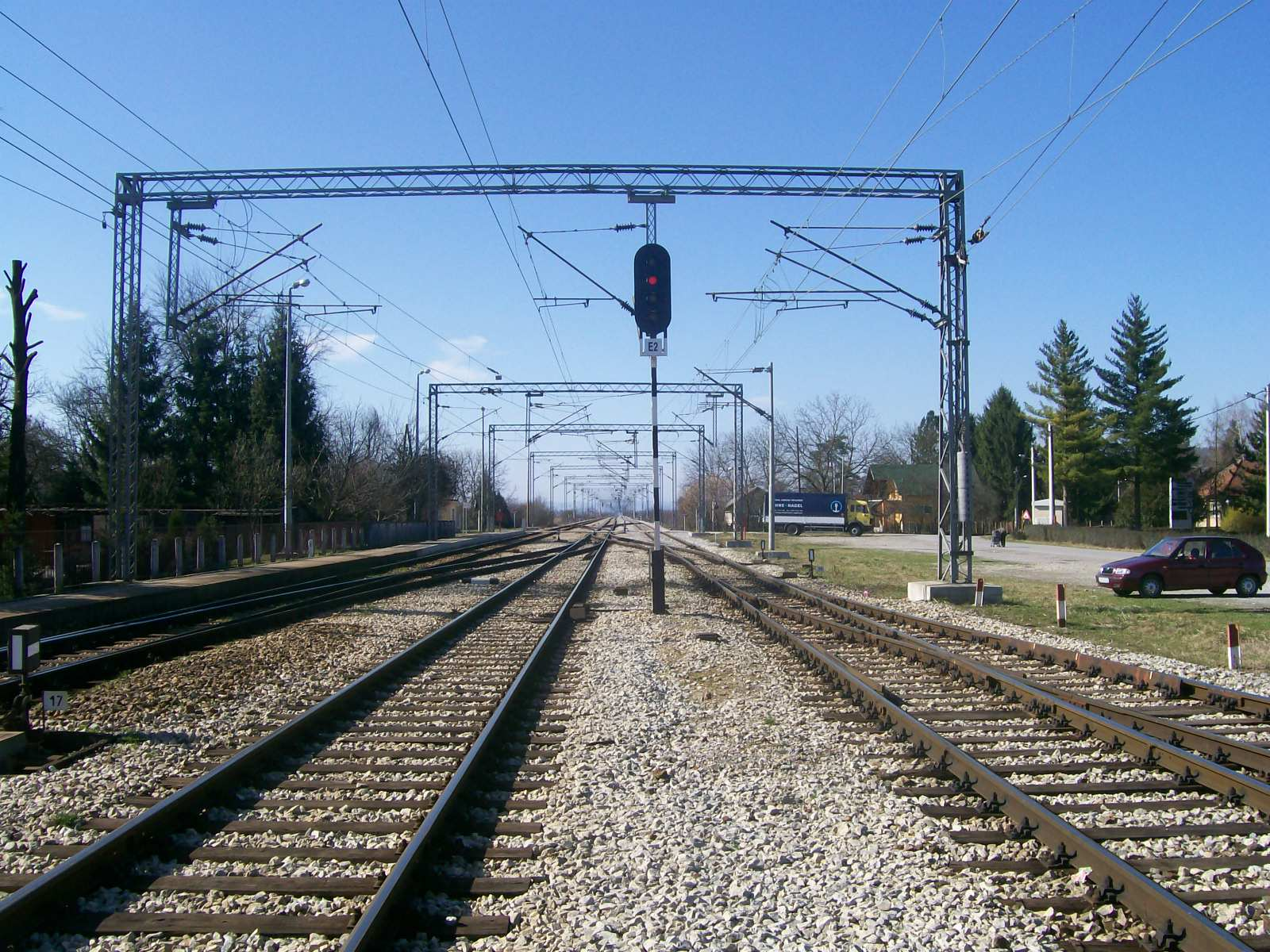
- Tracks at Savski Marof

Overview
- Line number: M101 (HŽ)
- Locale: Zagreb; Zagreb County
- Stations: 11

Service
- Type: Suburban rail; Regional rail; International rail

History
- Opened: October 1, 1862

Technical
- Line length: 26.709 km (16.6 mi)
- Number of tracks: 2
- Track gauge: 1435 mm
- Electrification: 25 kV 50 Hz AC
- Operating speed: Up to 120 km/h (74.6 mph)

The state border–Savski Marof–Zagreb Glavni kolodvor railway (Croatian: Pruga državna granica–Savski Marof-Zagreb Glavni kolodvor), officially designated as the M101 railway, is a 26.709-kilometre (16.596 mi) railway line in Croatia, connecting the nation's capital Zagreb and its main railway station to the Slovene railway network west of Savski Marof and further on with Ljubljana. Its route follows the Sava Valley. It is an integral part of the Pan-European Corridor X running from Salzburg and Ljubljana towards Skopje and Thessaloniki. The line is electrified and double-tracked. The line is used for passenger (urban-suburban, regional and international) and freight traffic.

The railway connects to the M102 railway at its eastern terminus in Zagreb, linking Zagreb with railways extending north to Budapest and east to Belgrade. Furthermore, the railway connects to the M202 linking Rijeka, the R201 to Čakovec via Zabok and the L102 railway to Kumrovec. The L102 is largely unused, and only a short section extending to the village of Harmica is in use. The M405 railway, a short line branching off to the south between the Zagreb Zapadni railway station and Zagreb Glavni kolodvor. The M405 terminates at the Trešnjevka wye, where it connects to the M104 and M202 railways.

The Savski Marof–Zagreb railway was opened in 1862 in former Kingdom of Croatia (Habsburg), as a part of a railway line from Zidani Most (present day Slovenia) to Sisak. The second track was commissioned in 1944. It was the route of the Orient Express service from 1919 to 1977.

In the early 1990s, stops in Kustošija and Gajnice were added between Zagreb West Station and Zaprešić for the needs of then newly introduced Zagreb Commuter Rail. In the first half of 2000s, stops in Vrapče and Gajnice were reconstructed: new 160 meter long and 55 meter high southern and northern platforms were built, with adding of the canopies, ticket offices, access for people with disabilities and rest of the urban equipment.

== Reconstruction of the Zagreb West Station - Savski Marof section (2021 - 2022) ==
From 2021 to 2022, entire 17.8 km (11.06 miles) long section between the stations Zagreb West Station (excluded) and Savski Marof, very important for international freight and urban/suburban transport, was reconstructed. Reconstruction included:

- Improvement of the construction parameters of the railway to designed construction speed of a maximum of 120 km/h (74.6 mph)
- Complete restoration of the upper and lower rail structure
- Rehabilitation of the bridges Krapina, Lužnica and Vrabeščak
- Repair of culverts and repair of underpasses Vrapčanska and Škorpikova
- Rehabilitation of three underpasses and installation of synthetic flooding at the railway-road crossings Sokolska, Kolodvorska, Savska, Brdovec and Savski Marof
- Arrangement of buildings in Savski Marof station and Brdovec stop
- Replacement of existing platforms and landscaped areas with new ones at Zaprešić station and Kustošija, Podsused Stajalište, Zaprešić Savska and Brdovec stops
- Installation of canopies in the Kustošija, Podsused, Zaprešić Savska and Brdovec stops
- Harmonization of signaling and security and telecommunication devices
- Complete overhaul of the electrification system

== Reconstruction of the Zagreb West Station - Zagreb Main Station section (2023 - 2024) ==
From 2023 to 2024, 3.4 km (1.2 mi) long section between Zagreb West Station and Zagreb Main Station was also reconstructed. The railway renovation project on the section Zagreb West Station (inclusive) - Zagreb Main Station (exclusive) included complete renovation of the upper and lower track structure (including renovation of tracks, replacement of switches and replacing of the old passenger platforms with new ones in the area of Zagreb West Station), as well as work on bridges/culverts, signal-safety and telecommunication devices and partial renovation/replacement of the electrification network system. Reconstructions of the Zagreb Zapadni railway station building and two at-grade railway crossings were also included. Maximum operational speed for trains on the route after section's reconstruction was raised to 120 km/h.

== See also ==
- List of railways in Croatia
