= Banova Jaruga railway station =

Railway station in Croatia

Coordinates: 45°26′45″N 16°52′35″E

Banova Jaruga
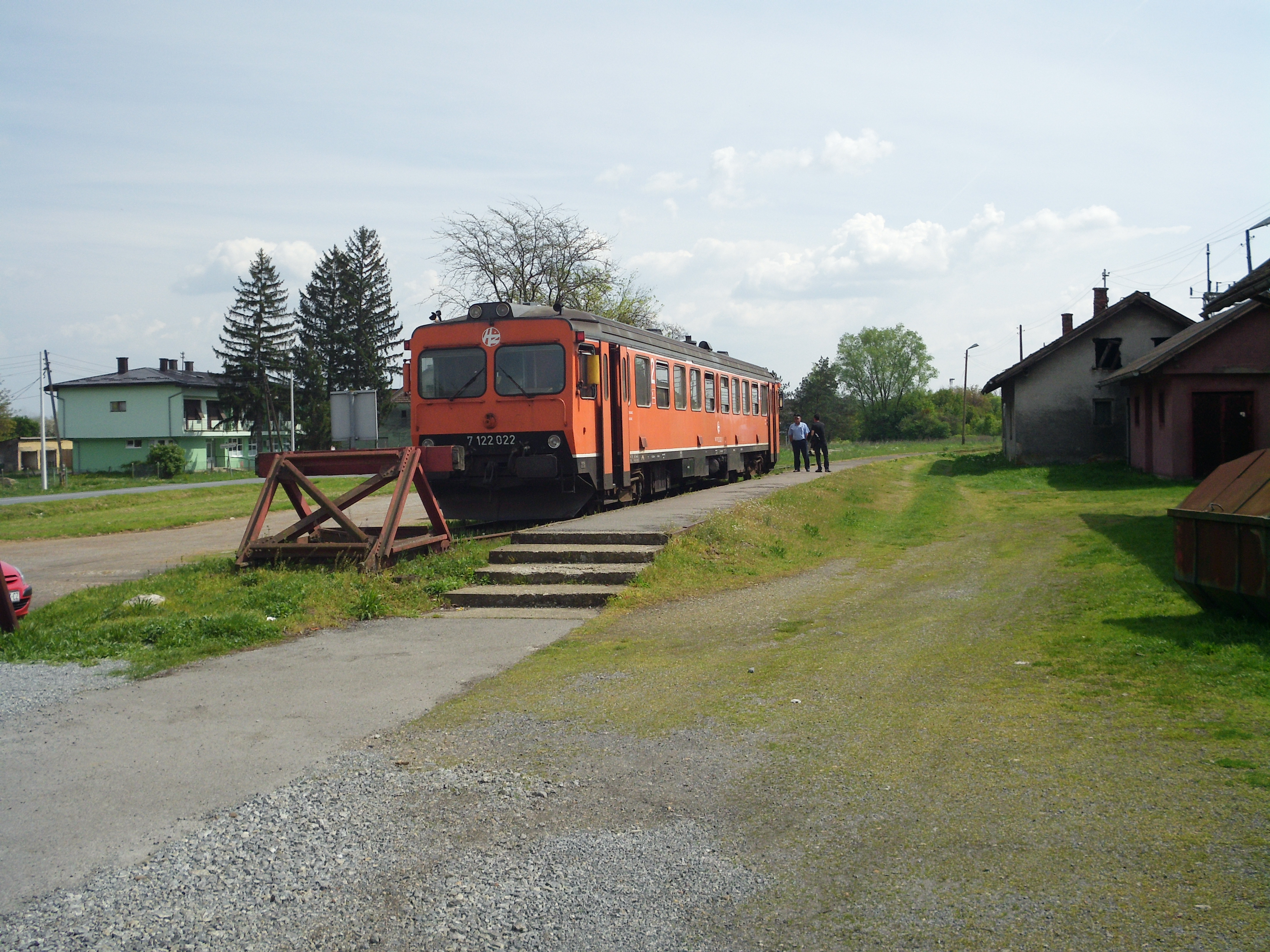

General information
- Location: Croatia
- Tracks: 5
Location

Banova Jaruga railway station (Croatian: Željeznički kolodvor Banova Jaruga) is a railway station on Dugo Selo–Novska railway in Croatia, located in Banova Jaruga. The railway continues towards Kutina in one direction, towards Lipovljani in other direction branches off in third direction towards Lipik and Daruvar. Banova Jaruga railway station consists of 5 railway tracks.

== See also ==
- Croatian Railways
- Zagreb–Belgrade railway
