= L214 railway (Croatia) =

Railway line in Croatia

Gradec-Sveti Ivan Žabno railway

Overview
- Status: Active
- Owner: HŽ Infrastruktura d.o.o.
- Line number: L214 (HŽ)
- Locale: Zagreb County; Koprivnica-Križevci County
- Stations: 5

Service
- Type: Local rail
- Operator(s): HŽ Putnički prijevoz

History
- Opened: December 15, 2019

Technical
- Line length: 12.5 km (7.76 mi)
- Number of tracks: 1
- Track gauge: 1,435 mm (4 ft 8 1/2 in) standard gauge
- Electrification: Non-electrified
- Operating speed: Up to 120 km/h (74.6 mph)

The Gradec-Sveti Ivan Žabno railway, officially designated as L214 railway is a 12.5 km (7.8 mi) railway line of local significance in Croatia that connects stations Gradec and Sveti Ivan Žabno, representing the first newly built railway corridor in Croatia since 1967. The line is used for passenger (mostly local/regional) and freight traffic. The main purpose of the railway's construction was to bring the city of Bjelovar and its region closer to the City of Zagreb and to provide better mutual connection between Bjelovar-Bilogora, Koprivnica-Križevci and Zagreb counties. Trains on the new line provide the inhabitants of the region faster and better daily migration to work and school as the travel time between Bjelovar and Zagreb became shortened by about 50 minutes, meaning that the riding with fast or limited-stop services between these two towns now takes approximately just over na hour. Maximum operational speed for trains along the route is 120 km/h. Work on the construction of this railway began in December 2015 and the railway was put into operation on December 15, 2019.

Passenger trains running on this line provide regular, limited-stop and fast services and operate exclusively as diesel motor units on routes such as Zagreb-Bjelovar-Zagreb, Zagreb-Bjelovar-Virovitica-Zagreb and Zagreb-Bjelovar-Virovitica-Osijek-Zagreb (from December 2022) except for the summer- seasonal overnight fast service train Osijek-Virovitica-Bjelovar-Zagreb-Split-Osijek introduced in 2022 which operates as a classical compounded train (railcars hauled by a locomotive) and which represents the first direct railway connection of Bjelovar and Adriatic coast.

Prior to the construction of the Gradec-Sveti Ivan Žabno line, all DMU trains running between Zagreb and Bjelovar (or furthermore to/from Kloštar/Virovitica) have been using the M201 line between the Gradec stop and the station Križevci (located about 12 km northeast from Gradec) where a change of driving direction had to be made, considering that from Križevci the L203 railway (Križevci - Bjelovar - Kloštar) continues in the opposite direction towards the station Sveti Ivan Žabno (located about 14 km southeast from Križevci and about 20 km west from Bjelovar) and vice versa.

After the Gradec - Sveti Ivan Žabno bypass was put into service, limited number of local trains still daily serves the L203 stations between Križevci and Sveti Ivan Žabno.

== Railway construction (2015 - 2019) ==
The construction project of the new railway Gradec - Sveti Ivan Žabno included the following:

- construction of lower and upper railway structure with embankments, notches, cuts, drainage of railways and railway-road crossings
- construction of three overpasses, three underpasses and one bridge
- reconstruction of state, local and county roads in the length of 1.3 km
- construction of new connecting and bypass roads and field and forest roads in the length of about nine kilometers
- construction of three railway stations in Lubena, Remetinec Križevački and Haganj with 55-cm high passenger platforms, canopies, outdoor lighting system, access parking losts and a system for audio and video information for the passengers
- reconstruction of the station building in Gradec and the existing railway station Sveti Ivan Žabno (including installation of the new 55-cm high passenger platforms, new outdoor lighting system, canopies, access parking lots and system for audio and video information for the passengers
- installation of signaling and safety and telecommunication devices in accordance with the requirements for railways of importance for local transport
- construction of electric power connections and external and internal lighting
- construction of noise barriers
