= Dobova railway station =

Railway station in Dobova, Slovenia

Dobova
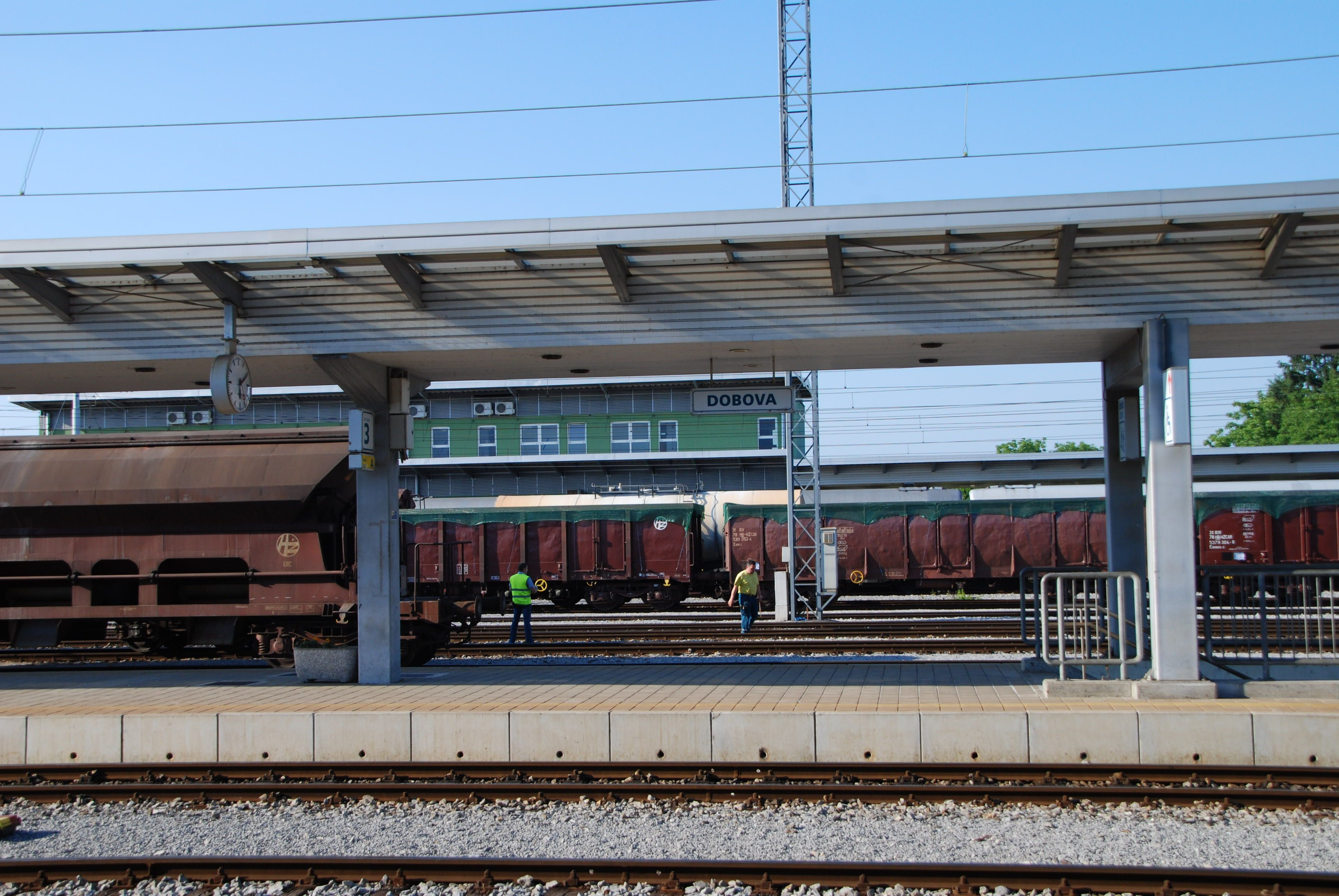
- Dobova railway station

General information
- Location: Selska cesta, 8257 Dobova; Slovenia
- Coordinates: 45°53′54″N 15°39′19″E
- Owner: Slovenian Railways
- Operator: Slovenian Railways
- Platforms: 2

Services
Preceding station	Croatian Railways	Following station
Krsko towards Zürich HB or Stuttgart Hbf	EuroNight	Zagreb Terminus
Location
- Location within Slovenia

Dobova railway station (Slovene: Železniška postaja Dobova) is the principal railway station in Dobova, Slovenia. It is a border station with Croatia.
