= Gora Veternička =

Coordinates: 46°09′47″N 15°59′31″E

- Village
- Location of Gora Veternička in Croatia
- Country: Croatia
- County: Krapina-Zagorje County
- Municipality: Novi Golubovec

Area
  - Total: 3.9 km^{2} (1.5 sq mi)

Population (2021)
  - Total: 202
  - Density: 52/km^{2} (130/sq mi)
- Time zone: UTC+1 (CET)
  - Summer (DST): UTC+2 (CEST)

Gora Veternička is a village in Croatia. The village was ranked #6 in the list of "Best Places to Live In in Croatia" in 2003. According to the 2001 census, the village has 283 inhabitants and 86 family households.
