= Zagreb Zapadni kolodvor =

Railway station in Zagreb, Croatia

General information
- Location: Zagreb; Croatia
- Coordinates: 45°48′33″N 15°57′14″E
- Lines: M101 to Zagreb Glavni kolodvor and Ljubljana via Savski Marof

History
- Opened: 1862
- Electrified: 25 kV 50 Hz AC

Services
City train services Harmica – Dugo Selo
Local train services Varaždin/Gornja Stubica/Đurmanec – Zagreb
Regional train services Varaždin – Zagreb
Express train services Kotoriba – Zagreb
Location

Zagreb Zapadni kolodvor (Croatian for Zagreb West station) is a railway station in the city of Zagreb, Croatia.

The station opened in 1862, and was the city's main station until the opening of the State Station in 1892. The station was originally called Južni kolodvor, or Agram Südbahnhof in German ('Zagreb South station'). In 1924 it was renamed kolodvor Sava, and in 1943 it received its current name: Zapadni kolodvor.

The station has retained its original appearance, and has been protected as a cultural monument since 1986. The building was renovated in 2007.
