= Lipovljani =

- Municipality
- Općina Lipovljani; Municipality of Lipovljani
- Location in Croatia
- Coordinates: 45°24′0″N 16°53′24″E
- Country: Croatia
- County: Sisak-Moslavina County

Government
  - Municipal mayor: Nikola Horvat (HSS)

Area
  - Municipality: 103.4 km^{2} (39.9 sq mi)
  - Urban: 29.0 km^{2} (11.2 sq mi)

Population (2021)
  - Municipality: 2,807
  - Density: 27.15/km^{2} (70.31/sq mi)
  - Urban: 1,902
  - Urban density: 65.6/km^{2} (170/sq mi)
- Time zone: UTC+1 (CET)
  - Summer (DST): UTC+2 (CEST)
- Area code: 044
- Website: lipovljani.hr

Lipovljani (pronounced [ˈlîpoʋʎani]) is a municipality in Croatian Slavonia in the Sisak-Moslavina County.

== Population ==
The municipality has a population of 3,455 (2011 census), in the following settlements:

- Kraljeva Velika, population 471
- Krivaj, population 307
- Lipovljani, population 2,260
- Piljenice, population 417

In the 2011 census, 87.5% of the population were Croats, while notable minorities included Ukrainians (4.3%), Slovaks (3.1%), and Czechs (2.6%).

Lipovljani has the oldest Ukrainian Greek Catholic Church because it was founded by early Ukrainian immigrants at the time of the Austria-Hungary Empire.

== History ==
In the late 19th and early 20th century, Lipovljani was part of the Požega County of the Kingdom of Croatia-Slavonia.

== Politics ==
=== Minority councils and representatives ===
Directly elected minority councils and representatives are tasked with consulting tasks for the local or regional authorities in which they are advocating for minority rights and interests, integration into public life and participation in the management of local affairs. At the 2023 Croatian national minorities councils and representatives elections Czechs, Slovaks and Ukrainians of Croatia fulfilled legal requirements to each elect their own 10 members minority council of the Municipality of Lipovljani.

== Notable people ==
- Nina Kraljić, Croatian singer

== See also ==
- Lipovljani railway station
