= M103 railway (Croatia) =

Railway line in Croatia

Dugo Selo–Novska railway

Technical
- Line length: 83.4 km (51.8 mi)
- Track gauge: 1435 mm
- Electrification: 25 kV 50 Hz AC
- Operating speed: 60 to 80 km/h (37 to 50 mph) max.

The Dugo Selo–Novska railway (Croatian: Pruga Dugo Selo–Novska), officially designated as the M103 railway, is a 83.405-kilometre (51.825 mi) railway line in Croatia that connects Dugo Selo, situated east of national capital Zagreb, to Novska and the M105 railway extending east towards Belgrade. Its route follows the Sava River valley. It is an integral part of railway Pan-European Corridor X running from Salzburg and Ljubljana towards Skopje and Thessaloniki.

The line is used for passenger (regional and international) and freight traffic.

The M103 railway is electrified using a 25 kV 50 Hz AC overhead line system and single-tracked. The maximum permitted speed along the Dugo Selo–Moslavačka Gračenica section is 60 kilometres per hour (37 miles per hour), while the maximum speed along Moslavačka Gračenica–Novska section 80 kilometres per hour (50 miles per hour).

At its western terminus in Dugo Selo, the railway connects to the M102 and M201 railways connecting Zagreb and Budapest (via Koprivnica) respectively. In Banova Jaruga, the railway connects to the L205 railway extending north towards Lipik. At the southern terminus of the railway, located in Novska, the railway links to the M104 railway connecting Zagreb via Sisak as in addition to the M105 railway.

== History ==
The Dugo Selo–Novska railway was opened in 1897. It was the route of the Orient Express service from 1919 to 1977.

As part of the Zagreb–Belgrade railway, electrification was finished in 1970.

== Reconstruction of the existing and construction of the second track on the corridor (2024 - 2029) ==
Because of the unsatisfactory technical condition of the track on the route, major reconstruction of the corridor (including the construction of the second, parallel track along entire route) is scheduled to be carried out between 2024 and 2029.

== See also ==
- List of railways in Croatia
