= M201 railway (Croatia) =

Railway line in Croatia and Hungary

Dugo Selo–Botovo railway
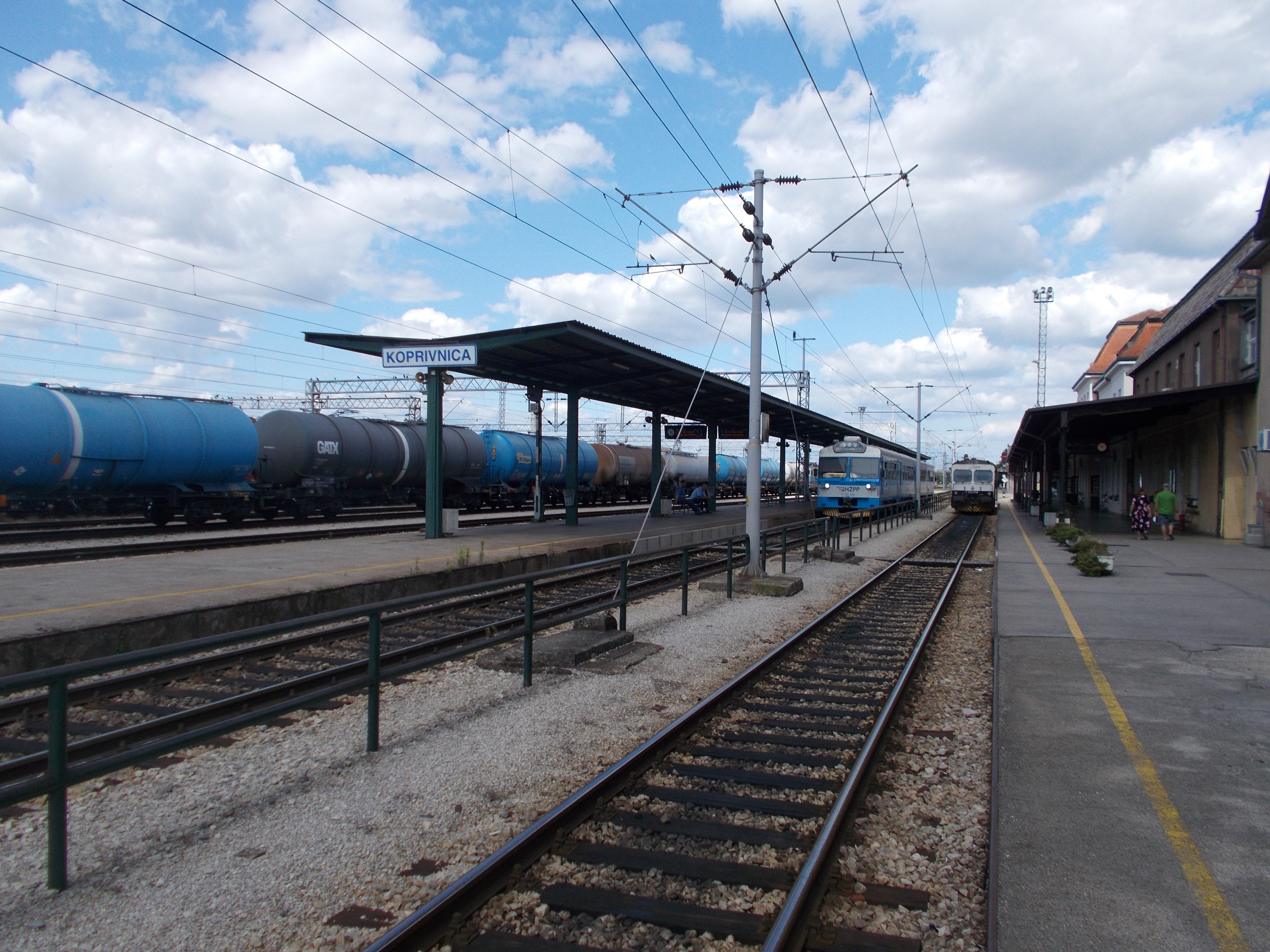
- Koprivnica railway station

Overview
- Line number: M201 (HŽ)

Technical
- Line length: 79.7 km (49.5 mi)
- Track gauge: 1435 mm
- Electrification: 25 kV 50 Hz AC
- Operating speed: 140 km/h (87.0 mph) max.

The state border–Botovo–Koprivnica–Dugo Selo railway, officially designated the M201 railway, is a 79.692-kilometre (49.518 mi) railway line in Croatia that connects the Croatian city of Dugo Selo, situated east of national capital Zagreb, with the Hungarian rail network. It is part of the Pan-European Corridor V, branch b, which runs from Rijeka to Budapest. The line is fully electrified and mostly single-tracked. It is used for freight and passenger (international, regional/commuter) traffic.

In Dugo Selo, the southern terminus of the railway, the line connects to the M102 line to Zagreb and the M103 to Novska and Belgrade. Further junctions exist in Križevci and Koprivnica, to railways L204 and R202 respectively.

== Reconstruction of the existing and construction of the second track on the Dugo Selo - Križevci section (2016 - 2024) ==
Part of the corridor between Dugo Selo and Križevci is currently under major reconstruction.

The project includes:

- construction of the second track and reconstruction of the existing one on the entire railway line section in the length of 36.4 km (conversion of a single-track railway into a double-track).
- major reconstruction of the existing stations of Dugo Selo, Vrbovec and Križevci and construction of the new station in Gradec. Reconstruction included: construction of new 55-cm high platforms, underpasses, canopies, parking lots, installation of a new outdoor lighting system and a system of video surveillance and visual and audio notification for passengers
- reconstruction of horizontal curves
- construction of 6 new bridges (including 2 road bridges) and the reconstruction of the existing 7, reconstruction / construction of 36 railway culverts
- construction of 12 grade-separated crossings with roads at two levels (11 overpasses and 1 underpass) and 6 pedestrian underpasses at stations and stops with the elimination of 17 level crossings and 2 pedestrian crossings
- complete overhaul of the electrification system and modernization of interlocking, signalling, and telecommunication devices
- construction of noise barriers
- construction of closed drainage system
- construction of 39 km of service and access roads
- construction of access parking lots, replacement of the old passenger platforms with new, 55-cm high ones, reconstruction of the outdoor lighting system, installation of canopies and a system of video surveillance and visual and audio notification for passengers at stop locations

After the reconstruction will be completed, maximum operating speed for trains along the route will be 160 km/h.

== Reconstruction of the existing and construction of the second track on the Križevci – Koprivnica – state border with Hungary section (2020 – 2024) ==
Part of the corridor between Križevci and the state border with Hungary is currently under major reconstruction.

The project includes:

- reconstruction of the existing track and the construction of a second track along the entire 42,6 km rail section (conversion of a single-track railway into a double-track).
- construction of a new Drnje – Novo Drnje – Botovo connecting track
- conversion of the Mučna Reka station into a stop
- construction of new 55-cm high passenger platforms, underpasses, canopies, parking lots, installation of a new outdoor lighting system and a system of video surveillance and visual and audio notification for passengers at all stations along the route (Lepavina, Koprivnica, Novo Drnje)
- dismantling of the existing Drnje and Botovo stations and construction of new Lepavina and Novo Drnje station buildings
- construction of a new stop in Peteranec
- construction of access parking lots, replacement of the old passenger platforms with new, 55-cm high ones, reconstruction of the outdoor lighting system, installation of canopies and a system of video surveillance and visual and audio notification for passengers at stop locations
- replacement of all level crossings with grade separated level crossings
- construction of noise barriers
- construction of a closed drainage system
- complete overhaul of the electrification system, modernization of control-command, telecommunications and signalling subsystems
- construction of 7 bridges, 1 gallery and 3 viaducts (as a part of horizontal curves reconstruction), one of which is a crossing for wild animals
- construction of 8 road overpasses and 3 road underpasses

After the reconstruction will be completed, maximum operating speed for trains along the route will be 160 km/h.

== See also ==
- List of railways in Croatia
