= L201 railway (Croatia) =

Varaždin-Golubovec railway

Overview
- Line number: L201 (HŽ)

Technical
- Line length: 35 km (21.7 mi)
- Track gauge: 1435 mm
- Operating speed: 60 km/h (37.3 mph) max.

The Varaždin–Golubovec railway is a 35-kilometre (22 mi) long local railway line in Croatia that connects Varaždin, Ivanec and Novi Golubovec with each other and is connected to further railway lines in Varaždin. It is non-electrified and single-tracked and used for both freight and passenger (local) transport.

== Gallery ==
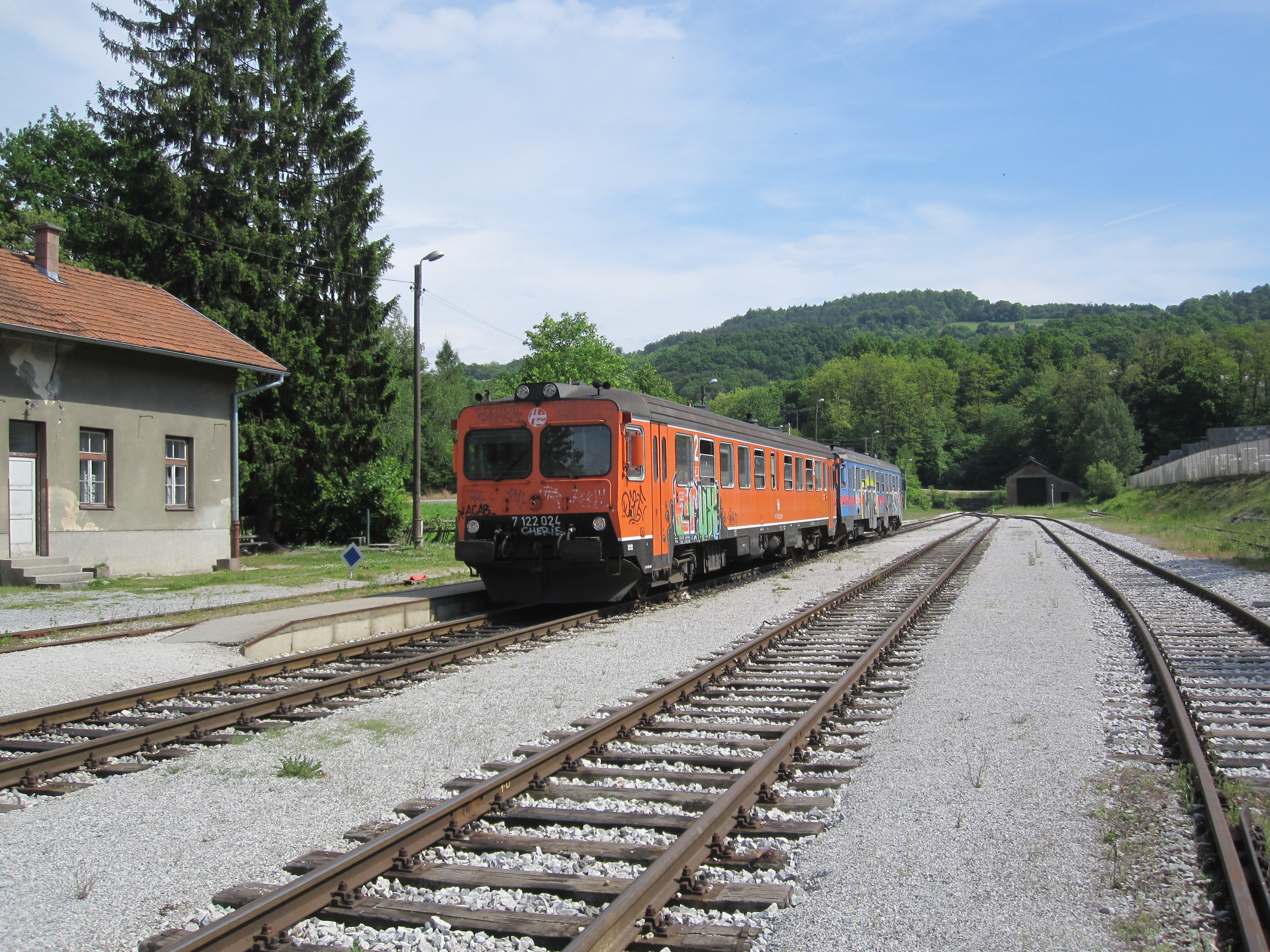
Golubovec Station
