= Gyékényes =

Gyékényes Đikeniš / Džikeniš (in Croatian)
- Village
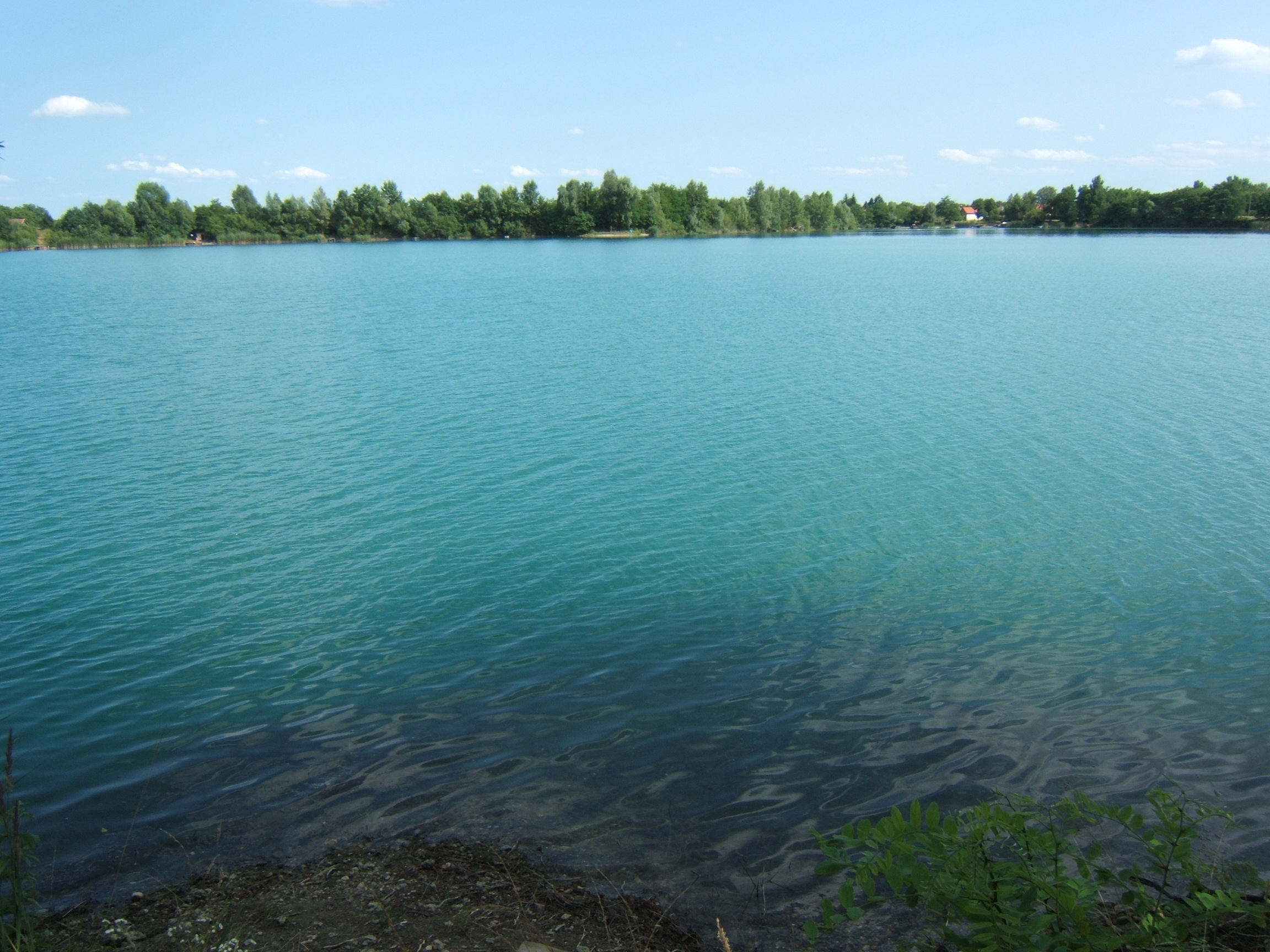
- Pebble mine lake in Gyékényes

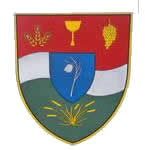
- Coat of arms

- Location of Somogy county in Hungary

- Location of Gyékényes
- Coordinates: 46.23557°N 17.00063°E
- Country: Hungary
- Region: Southern Transdanubia
- County: Somogy
- District: Csurgó
- RC Diocese: Kaposvár

Area
  - Total: 33.76 km^{2} (13.03 sq mi)

Population (2017)
  - Total: 994
  - Density: 29.4/km^{2} (76.3/sq mi)
- Demonym: gyékényesi
- Time zone: UTC+1 (CET)
  - Summer (DST): UTC+2 (CEST)
- Postal code: 8851
- Area code: (+36) 82
- NUTS 3 code: HU232
- MP: László Szászfalvi (KDNP)
- Website: Gyékényes Online

Gyékényes (Croatian: Đikeniš / Džikeniš) is a village in Somogy county, Hungary next to the Croatian border. Its train station serves as an important crossing point into Croatia.

== History ==
Gyékényes and its surroundings were already inhabited in the time of the Roman Empire; an excavation in 1971 found several artifacts from this time period.

The village was first mentioned in written documents in 1380. In this era, possession of the village was shared between several Magyar families. It was then under Turkish rule from 1600 until 1677.

Gyékényes was held by the Zichy family 1835 until 1945.

== Population and demographics ==
In 2017, the population of Gyékényes was 994. In 2011, a census found that 89.9% of its residents were Hungarian, 6.3% were Gypsies, 1.5% German, and 0.4% Croatian. The same census found that 62.4% of residents were Roman Catholic, 13.8% Evangelical, 6.6% non-religious, 2.4% Protestant, and 0.3% Greek Catholic (no data was collected on the remaining 14.2% of residents).
