= Pčelić =

Coordinates: 45°47′N 17°31′E

- Village
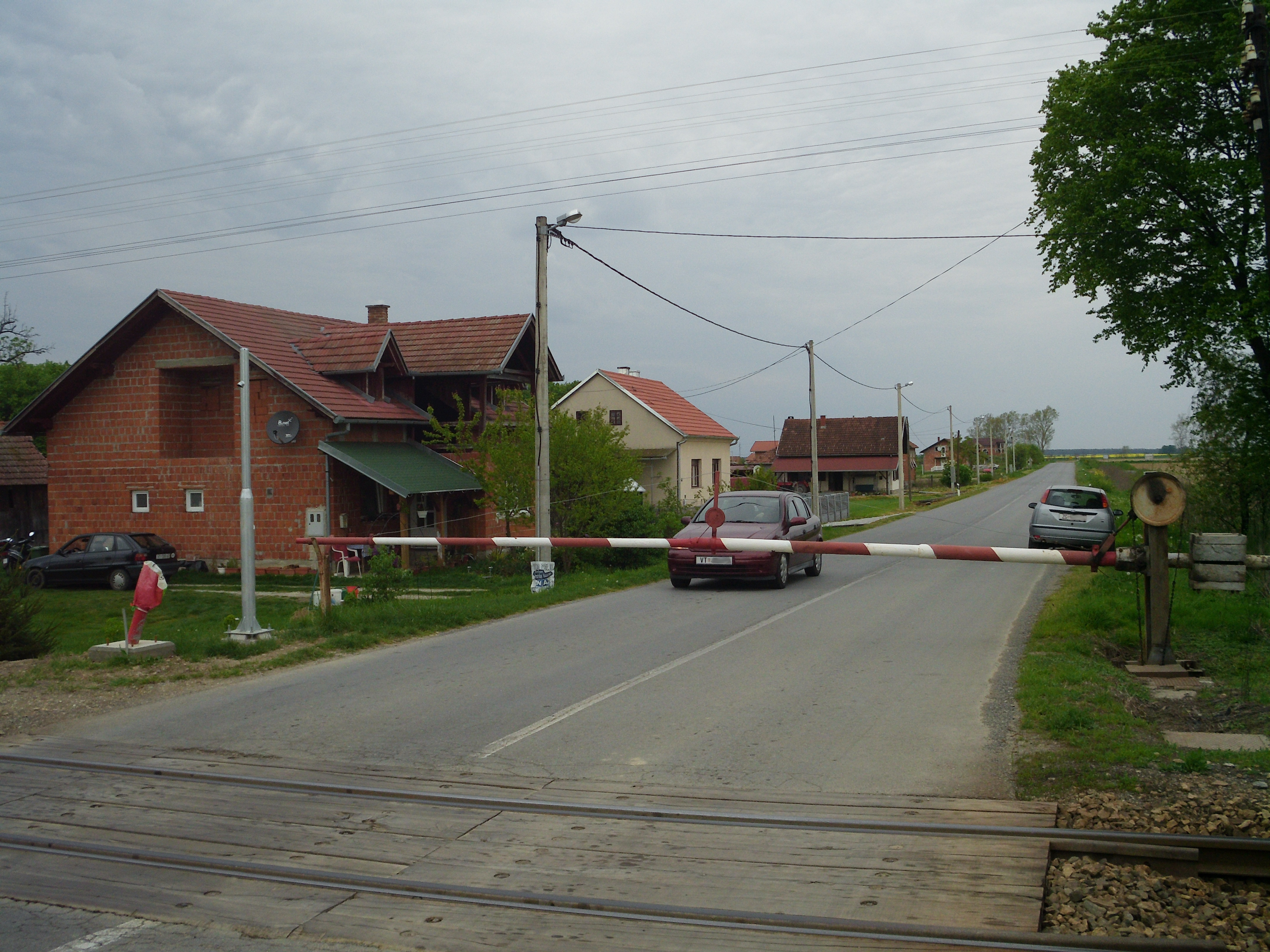
- Main road passing through Pčelić, Croatia.
- Interactive map of Pčelić
- Country: Croatia
- County: Virovitica-Podravina County
- Municipality: Suhopolje

Area
  - Total: 4.4 sq mi (11.3 km^{2})

Population (2021)
  - Total: 283
  - Density: 64.9/sq mi (25.0/km^{2})
- Time zone: UTC+1 (CET)
  - Summer (DST): UTC+2 (CEST)

Pčelić is a village in Croatia.
