= Banova Jaruga =

- Village
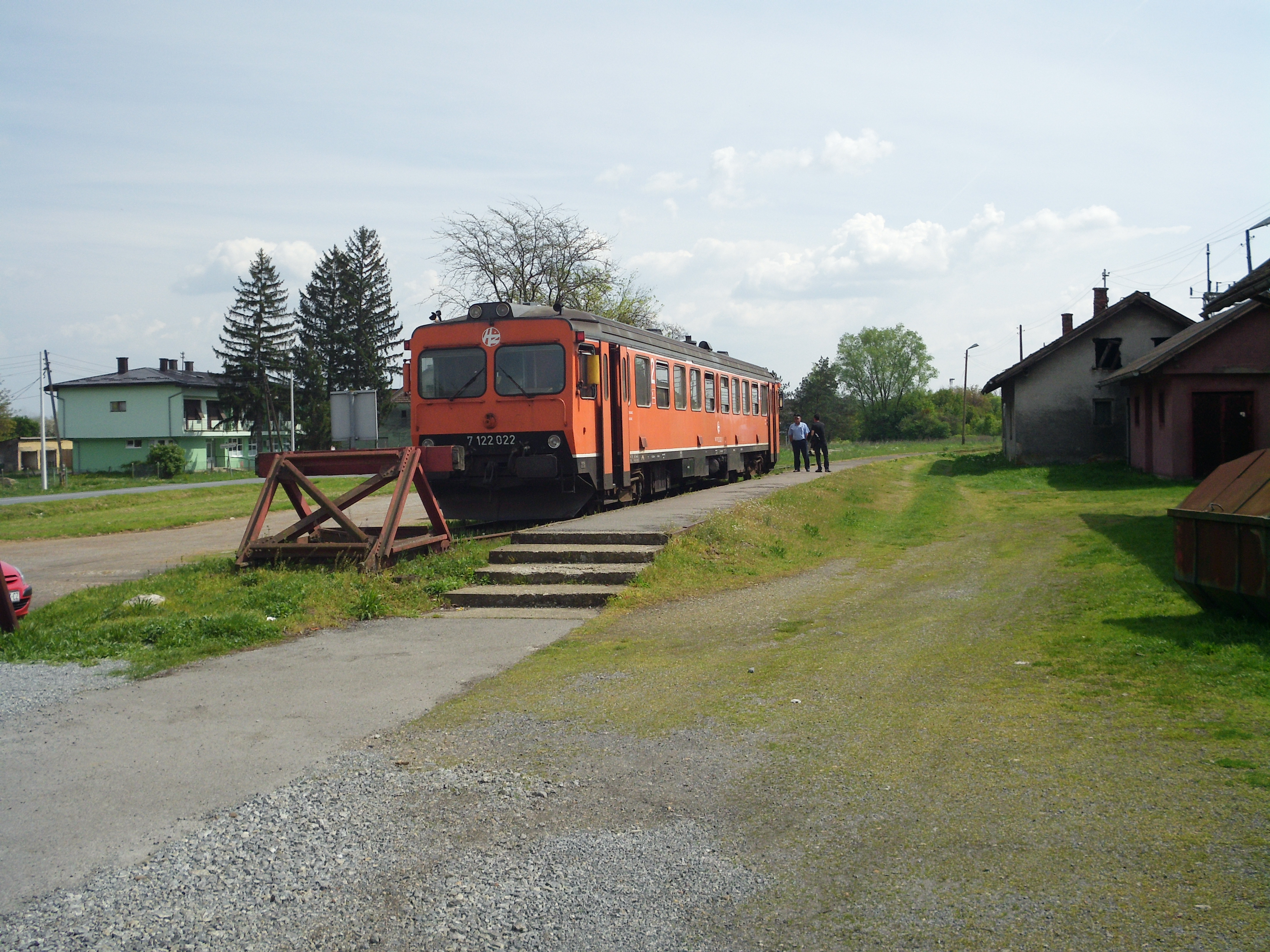
- Passenger train in Banova Jaruga, ready to depart towards Daruvar (2014).
- Interactive map of Banova Jaruga
- Coordinates: 45°26′N 16°54′E
- Country: Croatia

Area
  - Total: 3.6 sq mi (9.3 km^{2})

Population (2021)
  - Total: 605
  - Density: 170/sq mi (65/km^{2})
- Time zone: UTC+1 (CET)
  - Summer (DST): UTC+2 (CEST)

Banova Jaruga is a village in Croatia.

== See also ==
- Banova Jaruga railway station
