= Novi Golubovec =

- Location within Croatia
- Coordinates: 46°10′48″N 15°58′48″E
- Country: Croatia
- County: Krapina-Zagorje County

Government
  - Mayor: Ivan Delija (SDP)

Area
  - City: 13.7 km^{2} (5.3 sq mi)
  - Urban: 2.0 km^{2} (0.77 sq mi)

Population (2021)
  - City: 824
  - Density: 60.1/km^{2} (156/sq mi)
  - Urban: 192
  - Urban density: 96/km^{2} (250/sq mi)
- Time zone: UTC+1 (CET)
  - Summer (DST): UTC+2 (CEST)
- Website: novi-golubovec.hr

Novi Golubovec is a village and municipality in Krapina-Zagorje County in northern Croatia.

== History ==
In the ancient period, a Roman road passed through the area of today's Novi Golubovec Municipality, connecting the Krapina River valley with Ptuj. This territory belonged to the parish of St. Peter in Petrova gora, or the parish in Mihovljan, both of which are mentioned in the list of parishes of the Zagreb diocese from 1334.

Beatrice de Frangepan, widow of John Corvinus, donated the Veternica estate to the Pauline Order in 1515. The Paulines built the chapel of the Blessed Virgin Mary on their Veternica estate in 1641. The estate was donated by King Francis I to the Čazmanski chapter in 1808, and part of the former Pauline estate was sold off. The priests of the Čazmanski Chapter resided there until 1946, when the land was distributed to the peasants as part of the agrarian reform.

The development of Novi Golubovec began with the exploitation of coal in 1875. Among the first owners of the mine in Novi Golubovec was Count Jakšić. The first legal owner of the mine was the Styrian-Croatian Mining Society, following a decision of the Royal Court in Zagreb on 13 December 1875. On September 16, 1946, the Golubovec miners took control of the mine and founded the "Golubovec Coal Mines". The mined coal was transported by rail and horse-drawn carriages, later by trucks along the roads to Zlatar or to Lepoglava and Ivanec. In 1972, the chapel of Saint Barbara, the patron saint of miners, was built. With the shutdown of the coal mine in 1971, a large number of residents went to work in Germany.

The Croatian Parliament proclaimed the Municipality of Novi Golubovec on January 17, 1997. The Municipality Day is celebrated on December 4, the day of Saint Barbara - the patron saint of miners.

== Demographics ==
According to the 2021 census, there are 824 inhabitants in the area, in the following settlements:

- Gora Veternička, population 202
- Novi Golubovec, population 192
- Očura, population 58
- Velika Veternička, population 247
- Veternica, population 125

An absolute majority of the population are Croats at 99.39%.

Novi Golubovec: Population trends 1857–2021
v

population	703	847	621	1076	1362	1530	1647	1722	1911	1933	1644	1387	1270	1206	1073	996	824
	1857	1869	1880	1890	1900	1910	1921	1931	1948	1953	1961	1971	1981	1991	2001	2011	2021

Sources: Croatian Bureau of Statistics publications

== Administration ==
The current mayor of Novi Golubovec is Ivan Delija and the Novi Golubovec Municipal Council consists of 7 seats.

Groups	Councilors per group
HDZ	4 / 7
SDP	3 / 7
