= M102 railway (Croatia) =

Railway line in Croatia

Zagreb–Dugo Selo railway
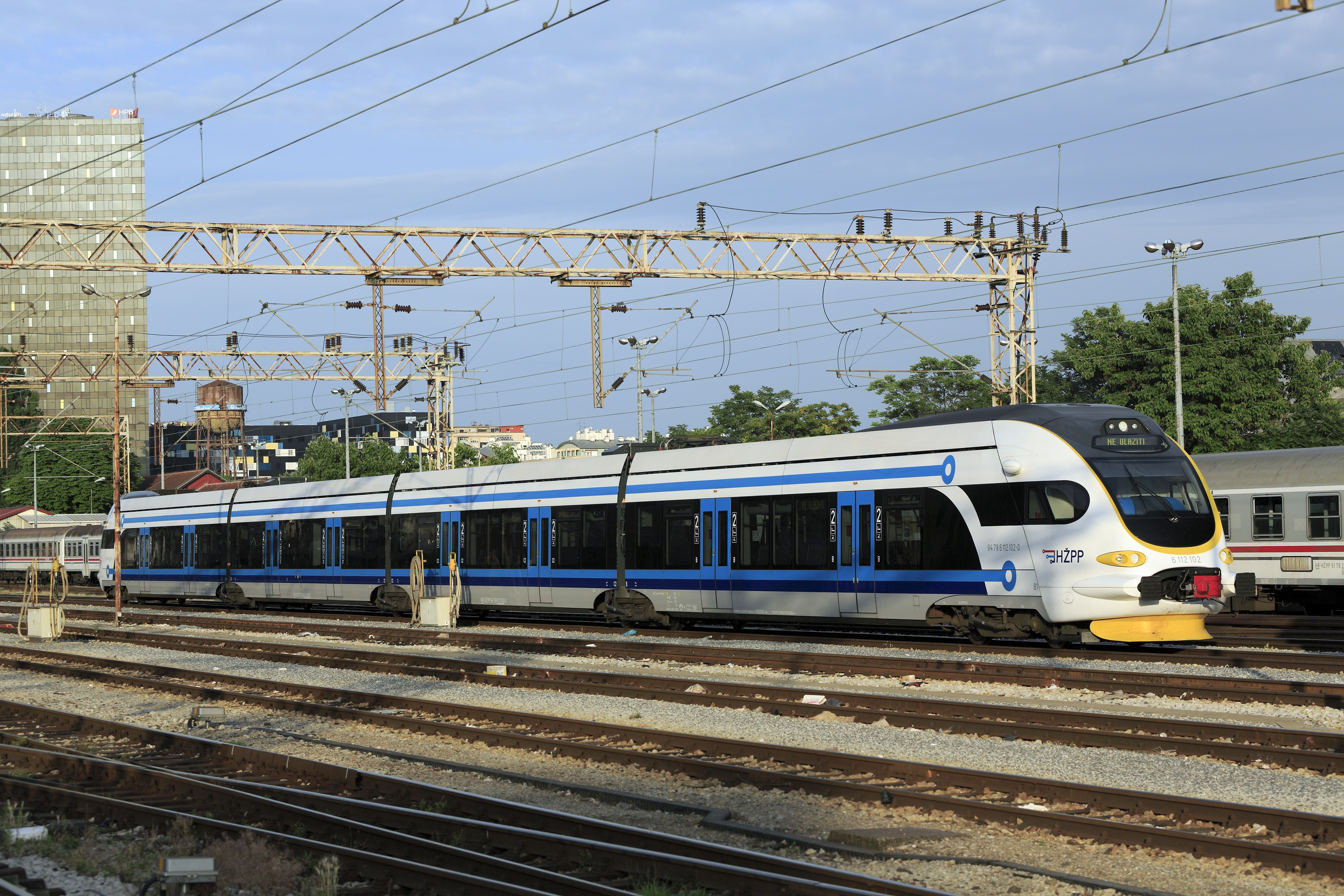
- Zagreb Glavni kolodvor

Overview
- Line number: M102 (HŽ)

Service
- Type: Suburban rail; regional rail; international rail

Technical
- Line length: 21.2 km (13.2 mi)
- Track gauge: 1435 mm
- Electrification: 25 kV 50 Hz AC
- Operating speed: Up to 140 km/h (87 mph)

The Zagreb Glavni kolodvor–Dugo Selo railway, officially designated the M102 railway, is a 22.202-kilometre (13.796 mi) railway line in Croatia that connects the Croatian capital city Zagreb with the Dugo Selo. It is part of the Pan-European Corridor V, branch b, which runs from Rijeka to Budapest and the Pan-European Corridor X. The line is fully electrified and double-tracked. The M102 railway connects to several other railway lines within the Zagreb railway node linking the capital to other parts of Croatia and neighbouring countries. Besides Zagreb Glavni kolodvor (Zagreb main railway station) and Dugo Selo, the west and east termini of the railway, the line serves six other railway stations. One of them is Zagreb Borongaj, where the L203 railway connects as a branch line. The line is used for passenger (urban-suburban, regional and international) and freight traffic.

In December 2022, newly-built railway stop Sesvetska Sopnica was opened for passengers between the stop at Čulinec and the station Sesvete. It is served by Zagreb's suburban (and some of regional) trains. In November 2024, construction started on the railway stop Sesvetska Sela, between station Sesvete and the stop Sesvetski Kraljevec. Construction is expected to finish in April 2026.

== Reconstruction of the Zagreb Borongaj - Dugo Selo section (2013 - 2014) ==
From 2013 to 2014, reconstruction of the railway corridor - upper and lower rail structure - and its electrification network was done between stations Zagreb Borongaj and Dugo Selo (excluding the stations Sesvete and Dugo Selo), which resulted in enabling of train operations at the maximum speed of 140 km/h on the open part of the track. Reconstruction also included installation of new canopies and replacement of existing passenger platforms with new ones at Trnava and Sesvetski Kraljevec stops as well as reconstruction of all culverts and at-grade railway crossings along the route

== See also ==
- List of railways in Croatia
- Zagreb–Tovarnik railway
- Zagreb–Belgrade railway
