= Savski Marof =

- Location within Croatia
- Coordinates: 45.864°N 15.722°E
- Country: Croatia
- County: Zagreb County
- Municipality: Brdovec

Area
  - Total: 0.8 km^{2} (0.31 sq mi)

Population (2021)
  - Total: 16
  - Density: 20/km^{2} (52/sq mi)
- Time zone: UTC+1 (CET)
  - Summer (DST): UTC+2 (CEST)

Savski Marof is a naselje (settlement) in the municipality of Brdovec, Zagreb County, Croatia. According to the 2001 census, it has 16 inhabitants living in an area of 0.78 square kilometers (0.30 sq mi). This makes it the least dense settlement and the smallest by population in Brdovec. It is second-smallest by area (after Harmica).
