= Budapest–Murakeresztúr railway =

Railway line in Hungary

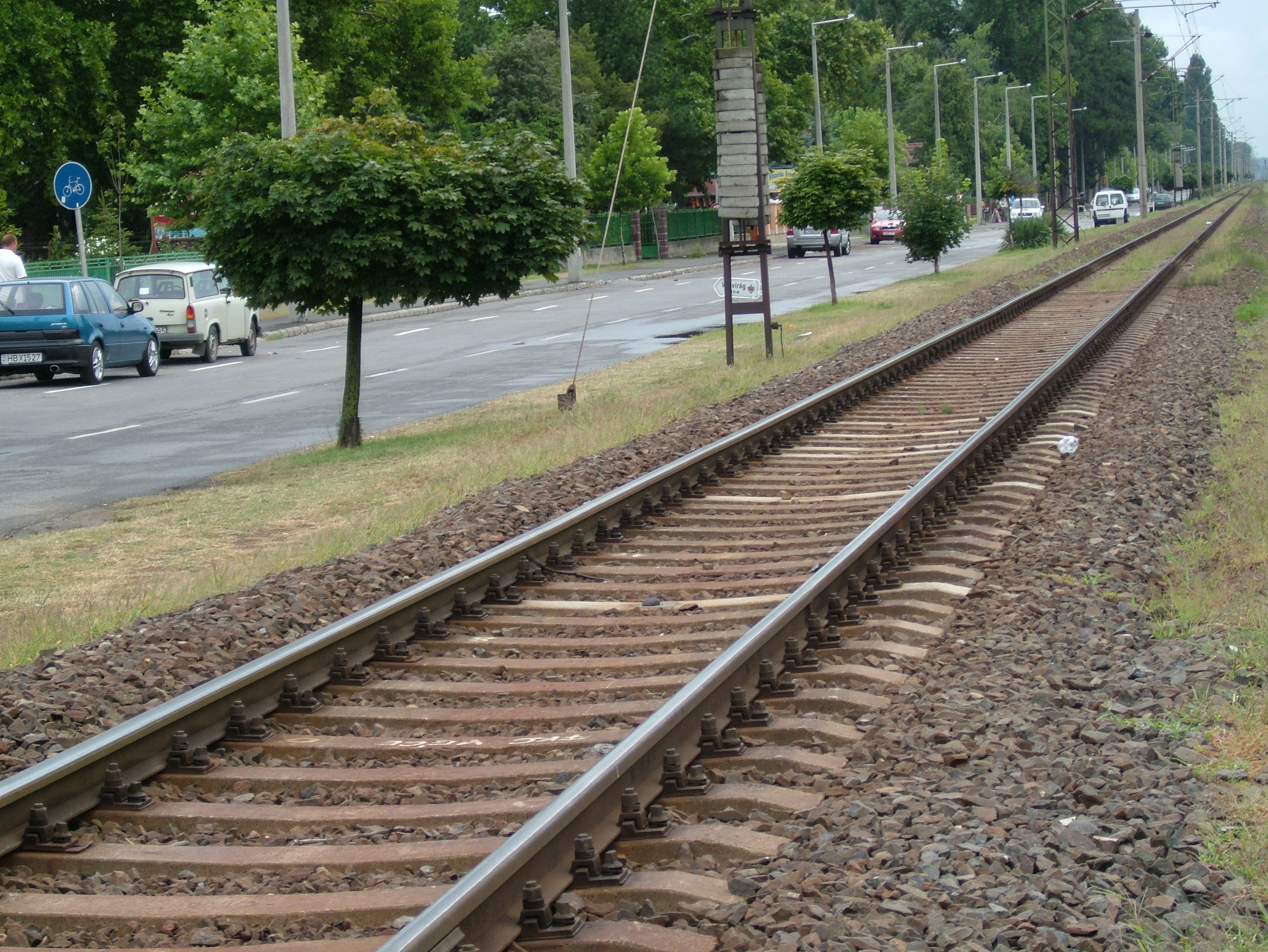
- The Balatonlelle section of a Budapest–Székesfehérvár–Nagykanizsa railway line

Overview
- Line number: 30 (MÁV)

Technical
- Line length: 235 km (146 mi)
- Track gauge: 1,435 mm (4 ft 8 1/2 in)
- Electrification: 25 kV 50 Hz
- Operating speed: 120 km/h (75 mph)

The Budapest–Murakeresztúr railway is a cca. 235-kilometre (146 mi) long railway line in Hungary that connects the Hungarian capital city Budapest with Nagykanizsa and Murakeresztúr. South of Murakeresztúr, the railway connects to the Croatian railway system, specifically the M501 railway serving Čakovec. The M501 connects to the Slovene railways at Središče ob Dravi, extending to Pragersko, while the R201 line branching off in Čakovec serves Varaždin.

The line is mostly single-tracked and electrified.

== History ==
In 1856, Concessions for the railways were granted to the private company, the Emperor Franz-Joseph Orient-Railway: from Ofen via Nagykanizsa to Pöltschach (Poljčane) on the mainline of the Austrian Southern Railway Company. The construction began in 1857, and the firm was merged with the Southern Railway Company in the following year. The building progressed, and trains could run as of 24 April 1860 on the section Pragerhof–Nagykanisza. On 1 April 1861, the section Ofen–Nagykanisza was opened for traffic. The principal artificial structures were the Gellért Hill tunnel in Budapest, railway bridges on the Mur and on the Sárviz waterway. The corporation collaborated with the Lake Balaton Company to lower the level of Lake Balaton in order to protect the railway track and its foundation.

== Gallery ==
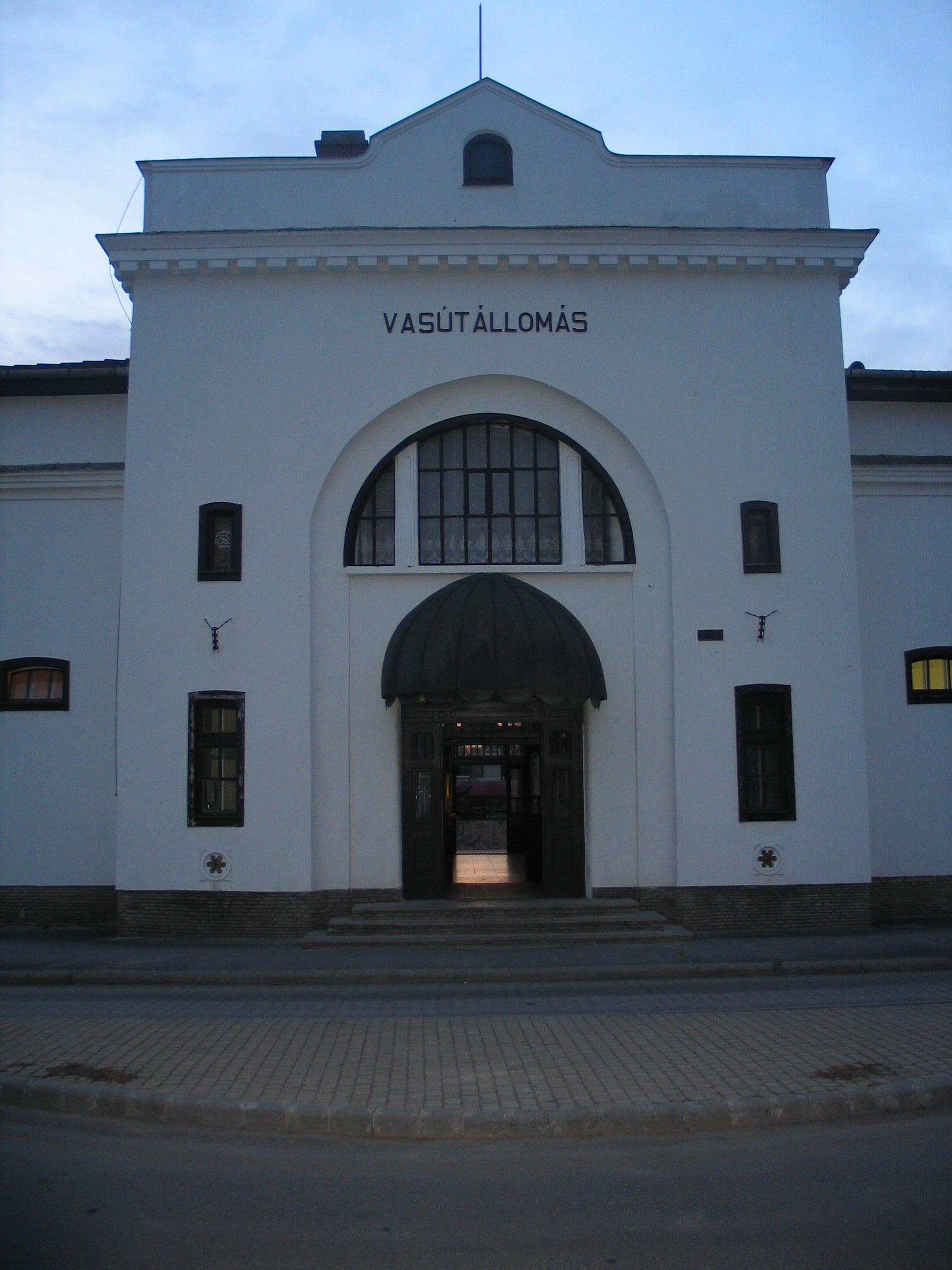
Nagykanizsa railway station

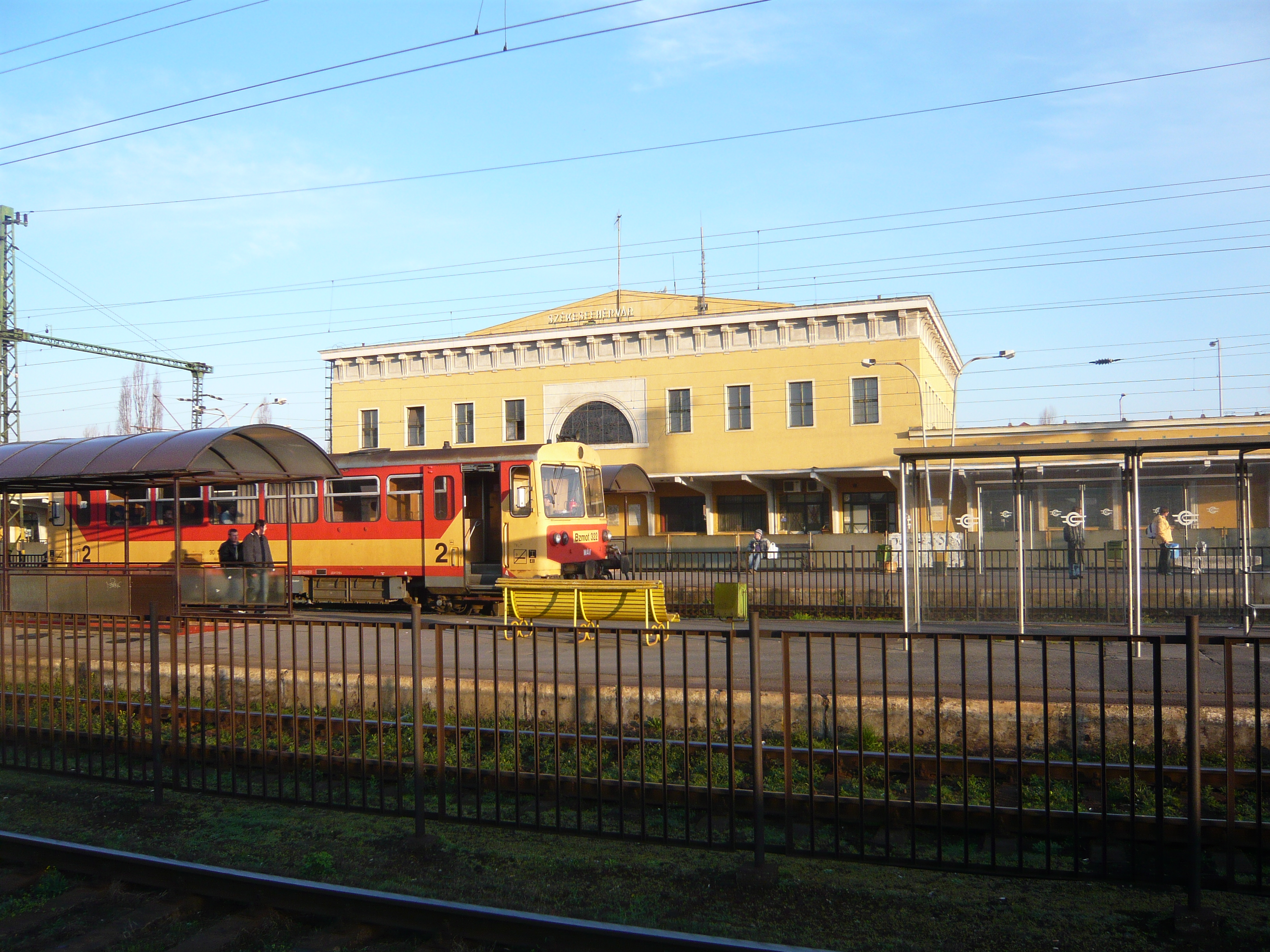
Székesfehérvár railway station

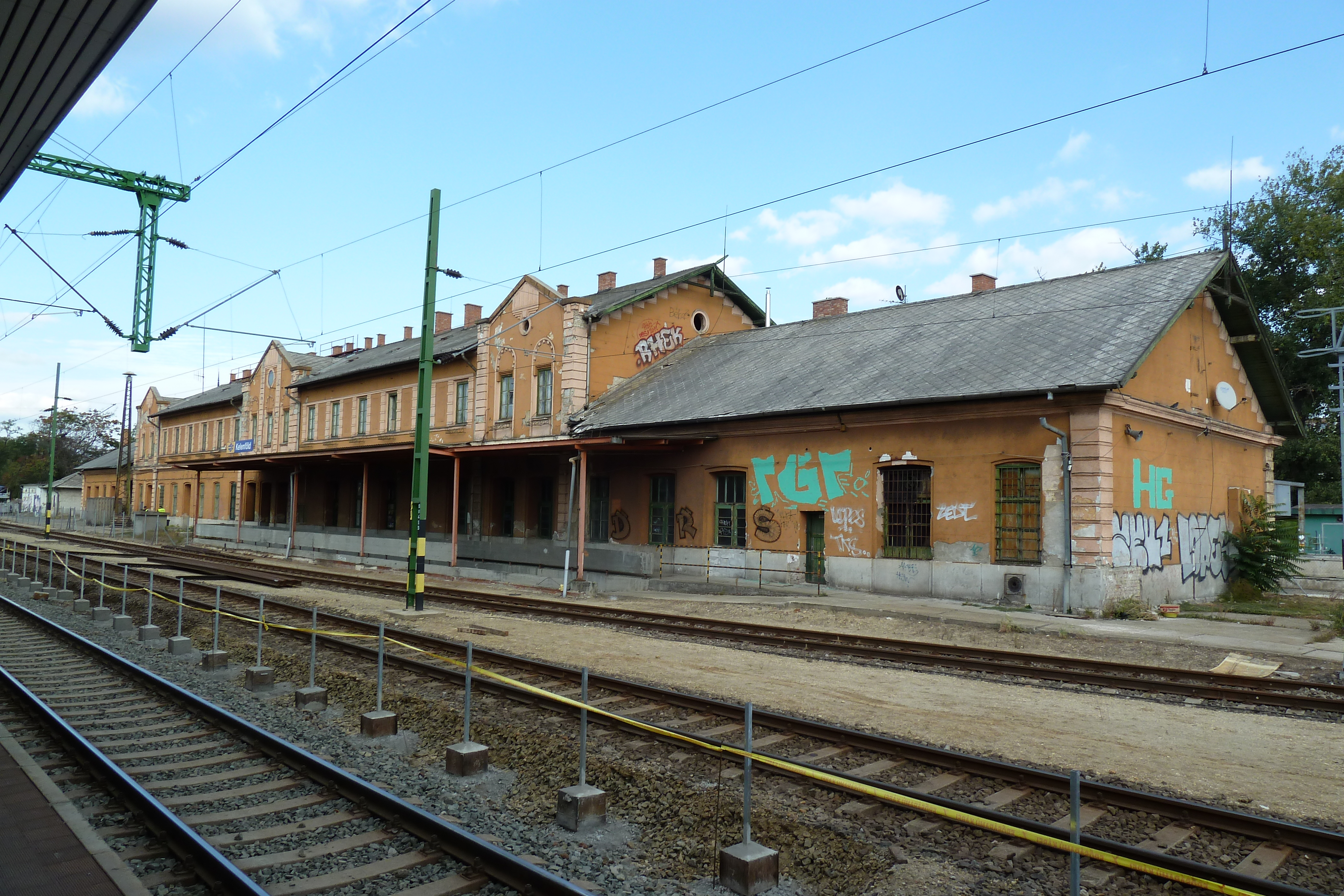
Budapest-Kelenföld railway station

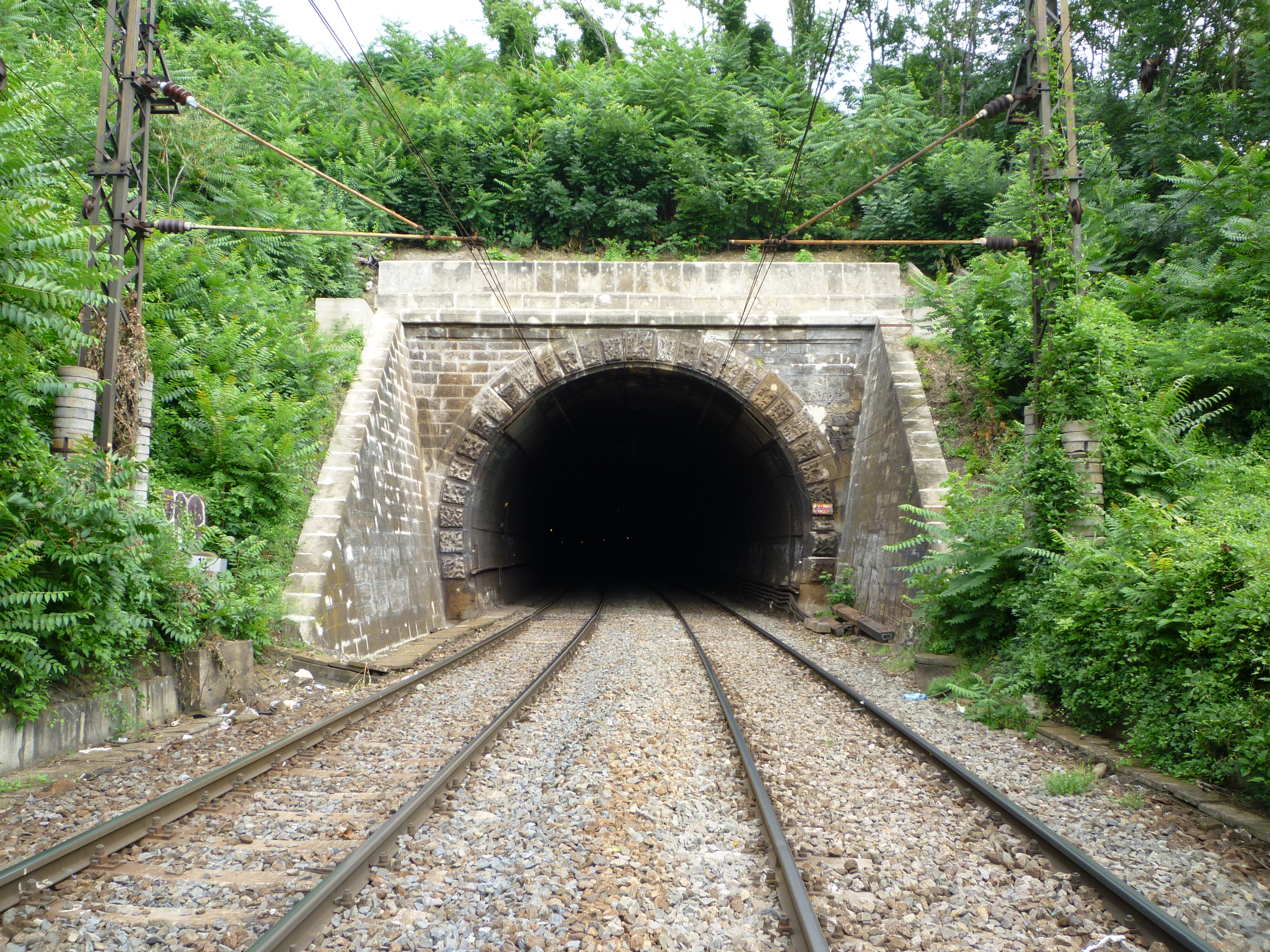
Tunnel before Budapest-Déli Terminal

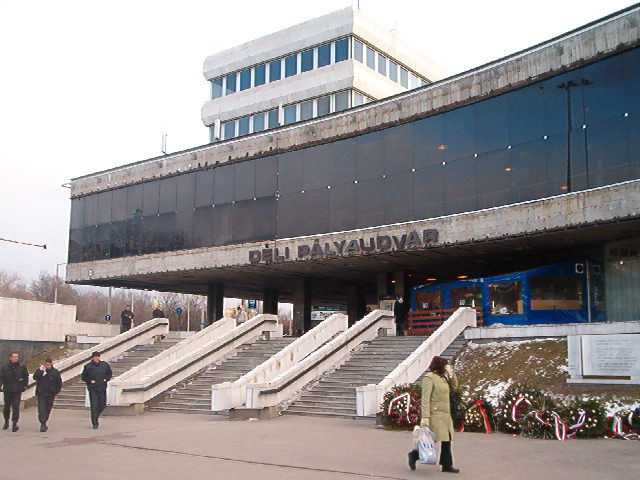
Budapest-Déli Railway Terminal
