= Pragersko railway station =

Railway station in Slovenia

Pragersko
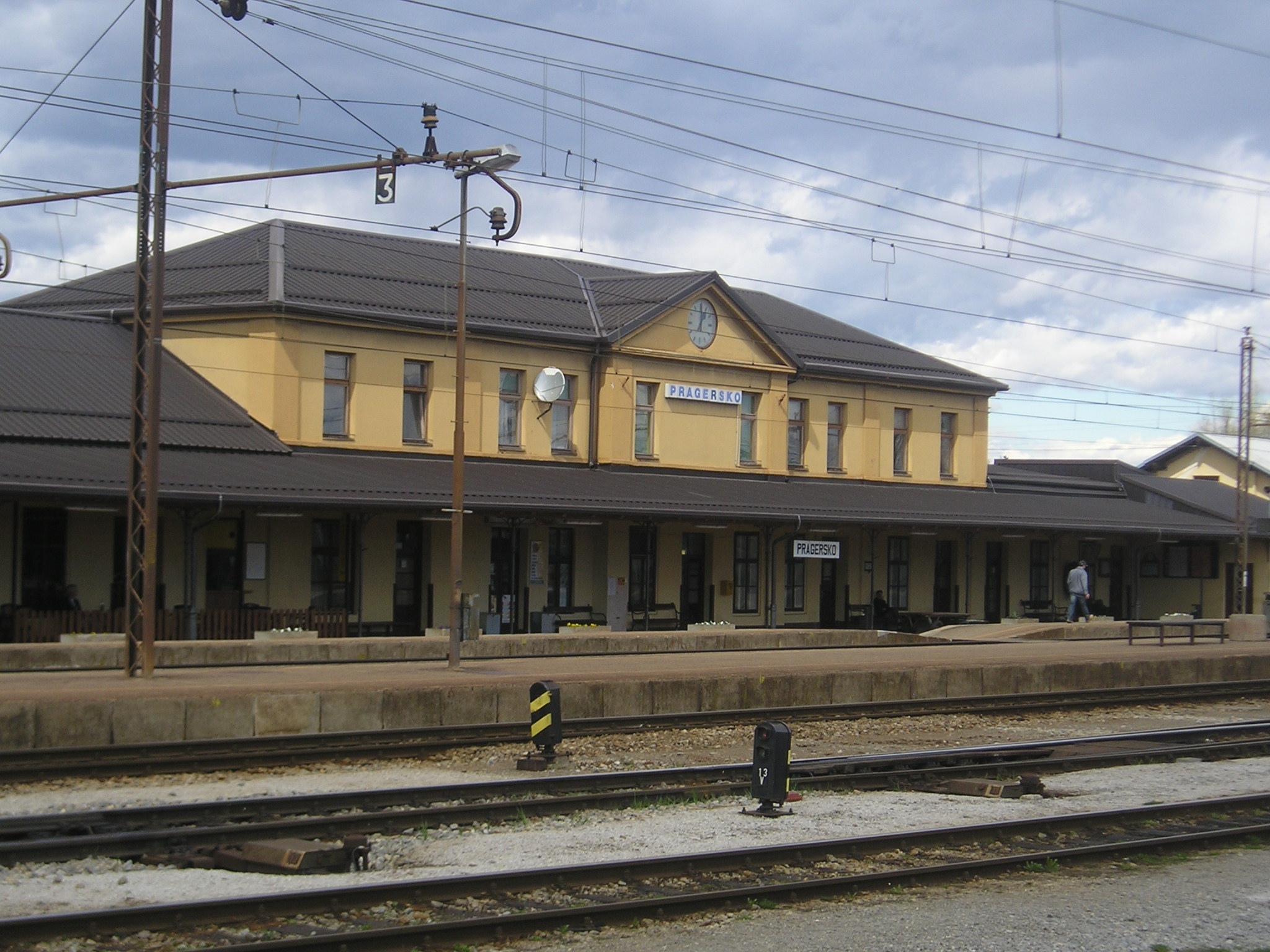
- View of the station building.

General information
- Location: Kolodvorska ulica 2331 Slovenska Bistrica; Slovenia
- Coordinates: 46°23′44″N 15°39′43″E
- Owner: Slovenske železnice
- Operator: Slovenske železnice
- Lines: Pragersko–Središče; Zidani Most–Šentilj
- Platforms: 4
Location
- Location within Slovenia

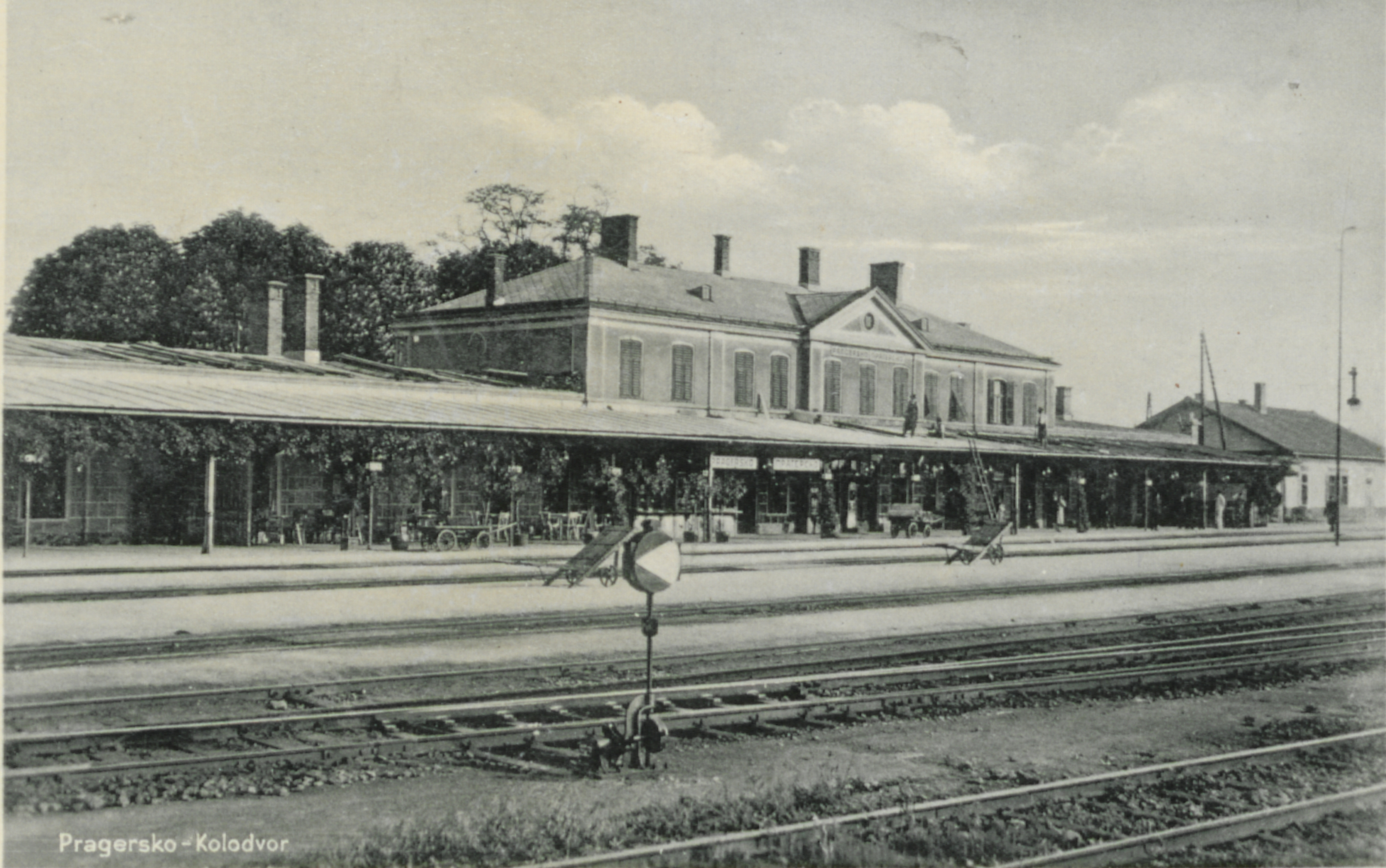
1930 postcard of Pragersko train station.

Pragersko railway station (Slovene: Železniška postaja Pragersko) is a significant railway station in Pragersko, Slovenia. It forms the junction between the main line from Ljubljana to Maribor, and the line from Pragersko to Čakovec in Croatia. It is currently being upgraded.
