= M501 railway (Croatia) =

Railway line in Croatia

Čakovec-Kotoriba railway
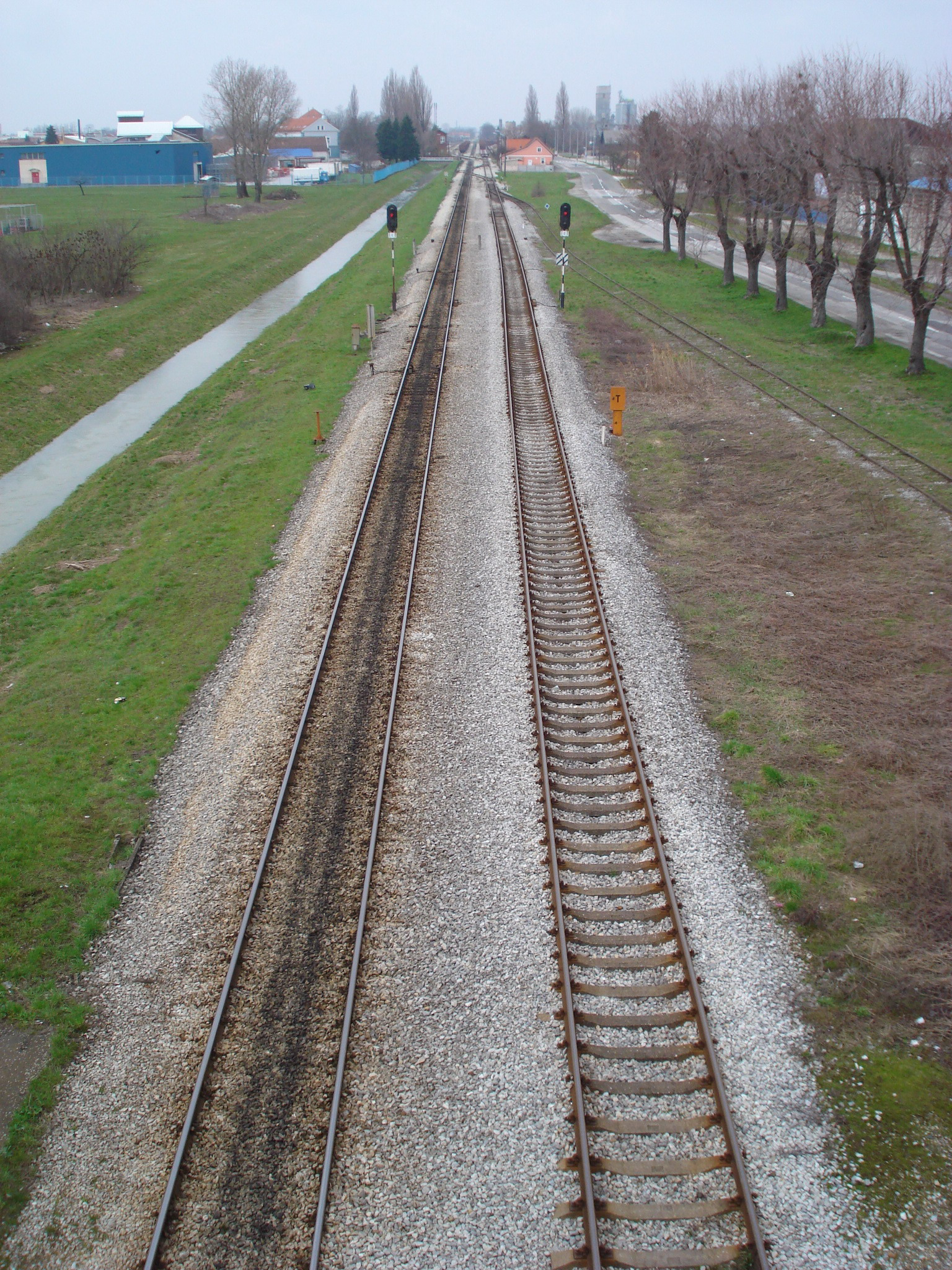
- Between Čakovec and Čakovec-Buzovec M501 railway (left) runs parallel to L101 railway (right), both are single tracked.

Overview
- Line number: M501 (HŽ)

History
- Opened: 24 April 1860

Technical
- Line length: 42.4 km (26.3 mi)
- Track gauge: 1435 mm
- Operating speed: Up to 100 km/h (62.13 mph)

The state border–Čakovec–Kotoriba–state border railway (Croatian: Pruga državna granica–Čakovec–Kotoriba–državna granica), officially designated as the M501 railway, is a 42.4-kilometre (26.3 mi) railway line in Croatia that connects the towns of Čakovec and Kotoriba to Slovene railway network via Pragersko and the Hungarian capital city Budapest via Murakeresztúr. The line is single-tracked and non-electrified, used for freight and passenger (local/commuter) transport.

The M501 railway connects to the rest of the Croatian railway network in Čakovec, where the R201 line extending south to Varaždin forms a junction with the M501. The M501 also connects to the L101 in Čakovec. The L101 serves Mursko Središće to the north of the M501 and also the town of Lendava in Slovenia.

== History ==
The Čakovec–Kotoriba railway was opened on 24 April 1860 as part of a railway line from Nagykanizsa to Pragersko, to connect Budapest to the existing Vienna–Trieste railway. This was the first railroad built in present-day Croatia. The route had three railway stations in Kotoriba, Donji Kraljevec, and Čakovec.

In 1863 they built new railway stations in Mala Subotica and Donji Mihaljevec, in 1920 was opened railway stop Čakovec-Buzovec, and in 1940s were opened railway stops in Čehovec, Macinec, and Dunjkovec.

In 1941, during World War II, the bridge over River Mura was blown up, but the second one was already built before the end of the war.

=== Reconstruction of the Čakovec - Kotoriba section (2020 - 2024) ===
Between 2020 and 2024, the entire section between Čakovec and Kotoriba was reconstructed, which included renovation of entire upper rail structure along the route, reconstruction of culverts, replacement of the old passenger platforms with new ones at Čakovec Buzovec stop and Donji Kraljevec / Mala Subotica stations, reconstruction of at-grade railway crossings and installation of canopies at Čakovec - Buzovec / Čehovec stops. End of the reconstruction resulted in raising of the maximum permitted operation speed for trains to 100 km/h.

== Gallery ==
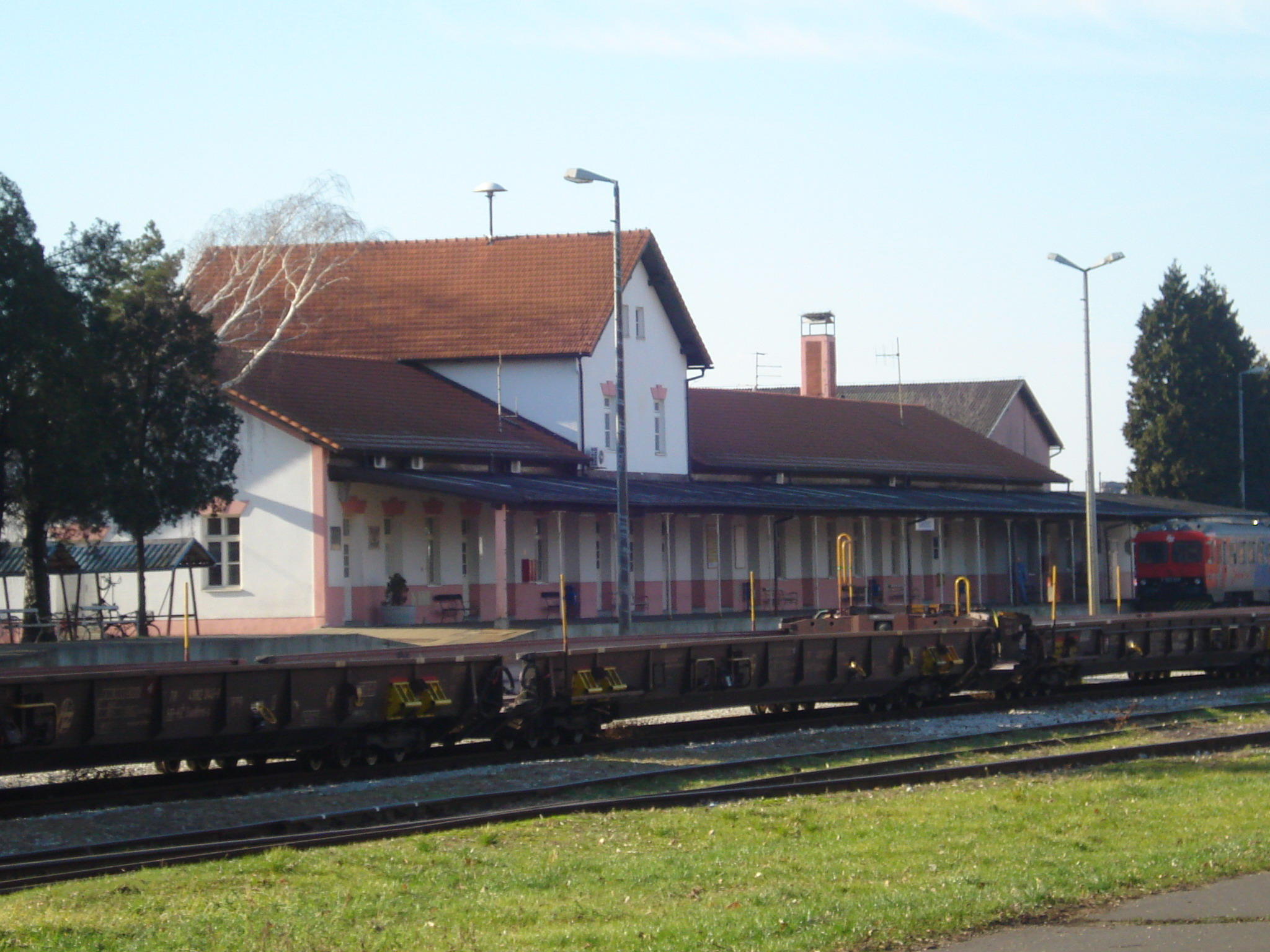
Čakovec main railway station

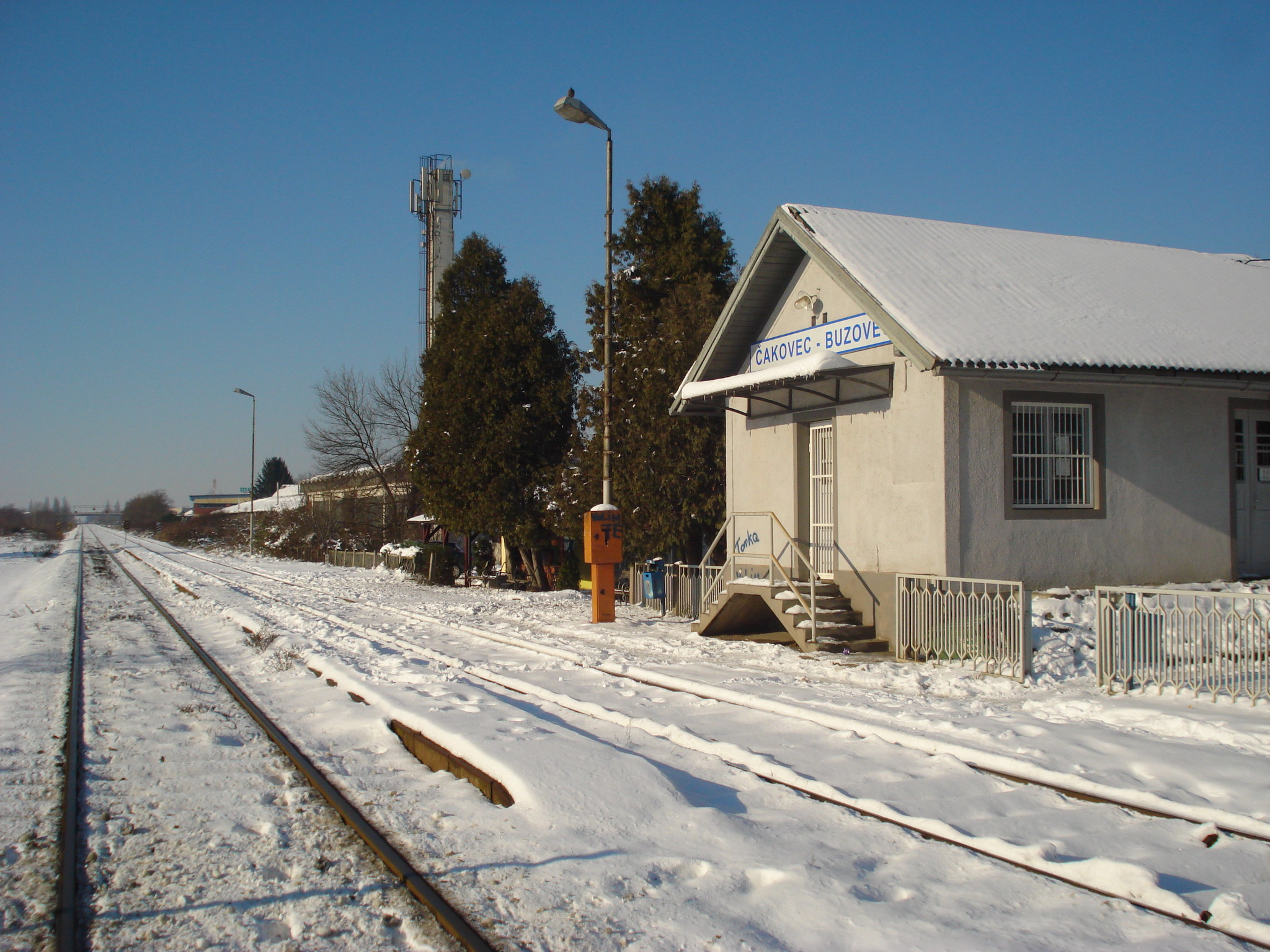
Buzovec, suburban railway station in Čakovec

== See also ==
- List of railways in Croatia

== Bibliography ==
- Dietrich, Herbert (1994). Die Südbahn und Ihre Vorläufer (in German). Wien: Bohmen Verlag.
- Strach, Hermann (1898). Geschichte der Eisenbahnen Oesterreich-Ungarns von den Anfängen bis zum Jahre 1867. Geschichte der Eisenbahnen der Oesterreichisch-Ungarischen Monarchie (in German). Vol. 1.1. Wien / Teschen / Leipzig: Karl Prochaska. pp. 73–503.
