= L101 railway (Croatia) =

Railway line in Croatia

Čakovec–Mursko Središće railway
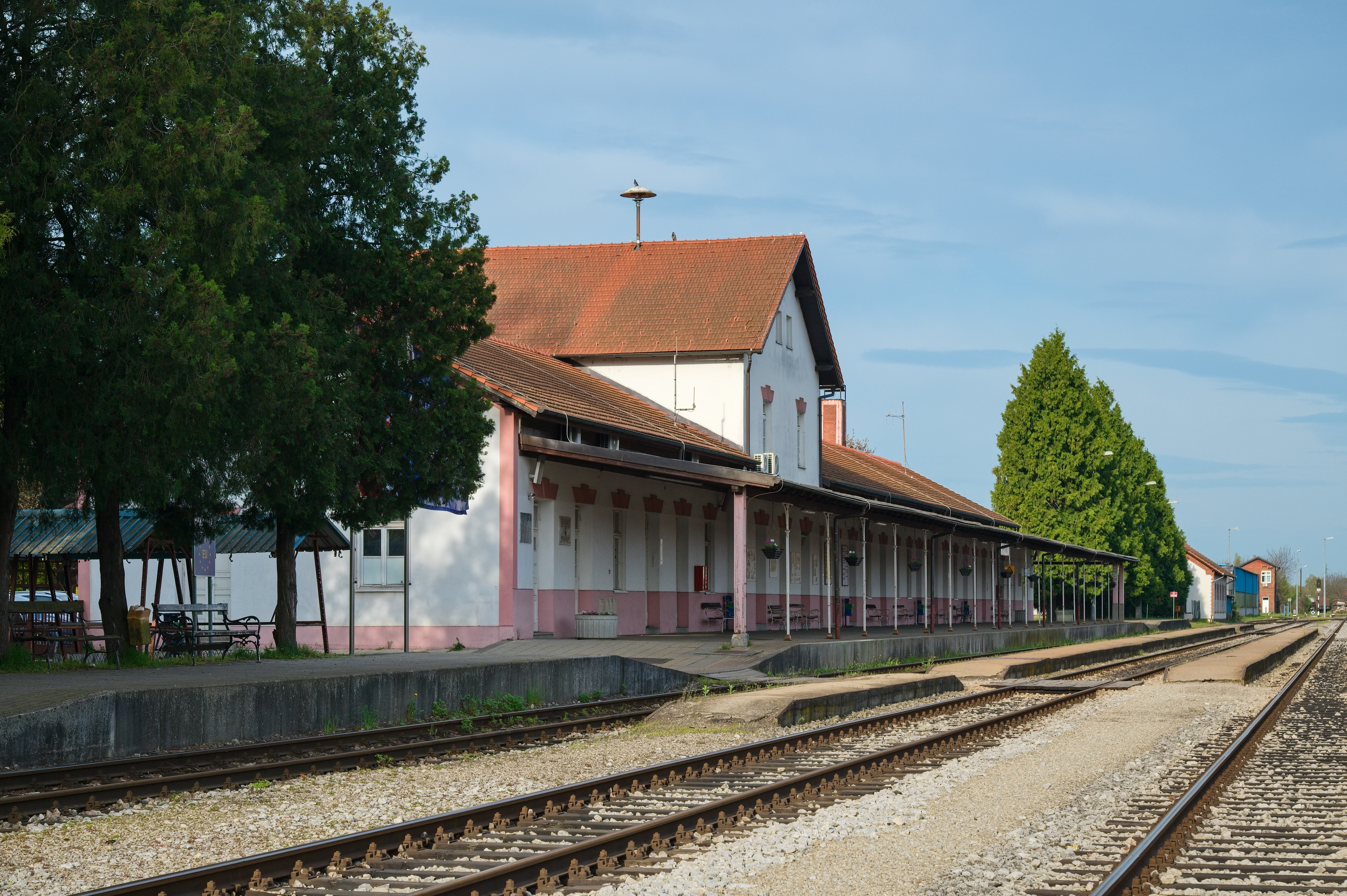
- Čakovec railway station

Overview
- Line number: L101 (HŽ)

Technical
- Line length: 17.9 km (11.1 mi)
- Track gauge: 1435 mm
- Operating speed: 60 km/h (37.3 mph) max.

The Čakovec–Mursko Središće railway, officially designated L101 railway, is a 17.942-kilometre (11.149 mi) railway line in Croatia connecting the cities of Čakovec and Mursko Središće. The railway line links to the Slovene railway line to Lendava to the north of Mursko Središće. In Čakovec, the railway also connects to the M501 to Budapest and Ljubljana and to the R201 to Varaždin and the rest of the Croatian railway network.

Route is non-electrified and single-tracked. The maximum permitted speed throughout the entire L101 railway is 60 kilometres per hour (37 miles per hour). The route was built in 1889 as Zalaegerszeg-Čakovec railway, but in 1945, after World War II, the route was dismantled between Lendava and Rédics. Slovenian Railways plans to rebuild the section between Lendava and Rédics.

== See also ==
- List of railways in Croatia
