= State border–Lendava Railway =

Railway line in Slovenia

state border–Lendava railway
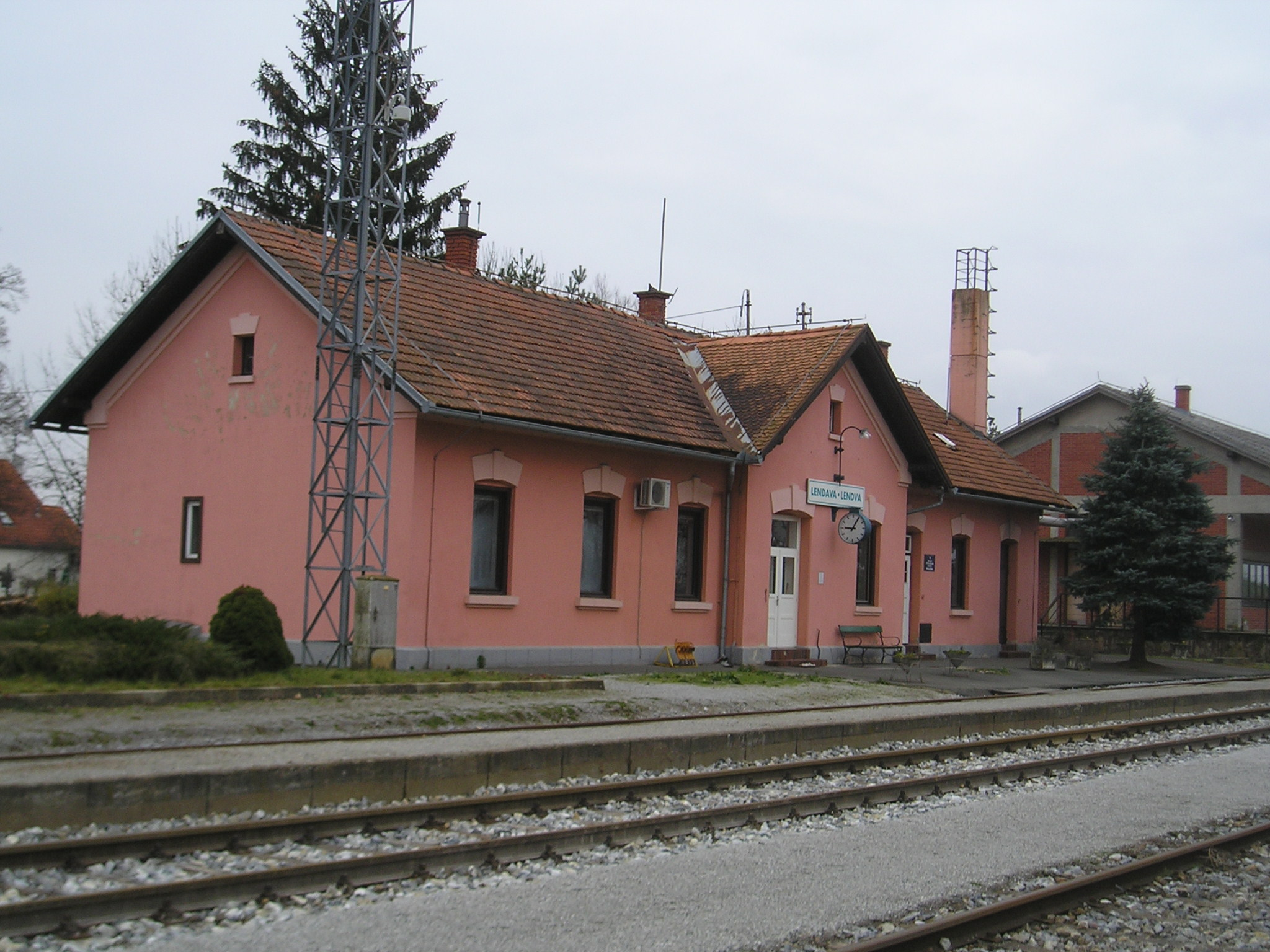
- Lendava railway station

Overview
- Line number: 43 (SŽ)

Technical
- Line length: 5.2 km (3.2 mi)
- Track gauge: 1435 mm
- Operating speed: 60 km/h (37.3 mph) max.

The state border–Lendava railway is a 5.216-kilometre (3.241 mi) long railway line in Slovenia that connects the Croatian L101 railway, linking Čakovec and Lendava with each other and is connected to further railway lines in Čakovec. The route is non-electrified and single-tracked. The route was built in 1889 as Zalaegerszeg–Čakovec railway, but in 1945, after World War II, the route was dismantled between Lendava and Rédics. Slovenian Railways plans to rebuild the section between Lendava and Rédics. Currently it is not possible to reach the rest of the Slovenian railway network from Lendava without going through Croatia.

== Gallery ==
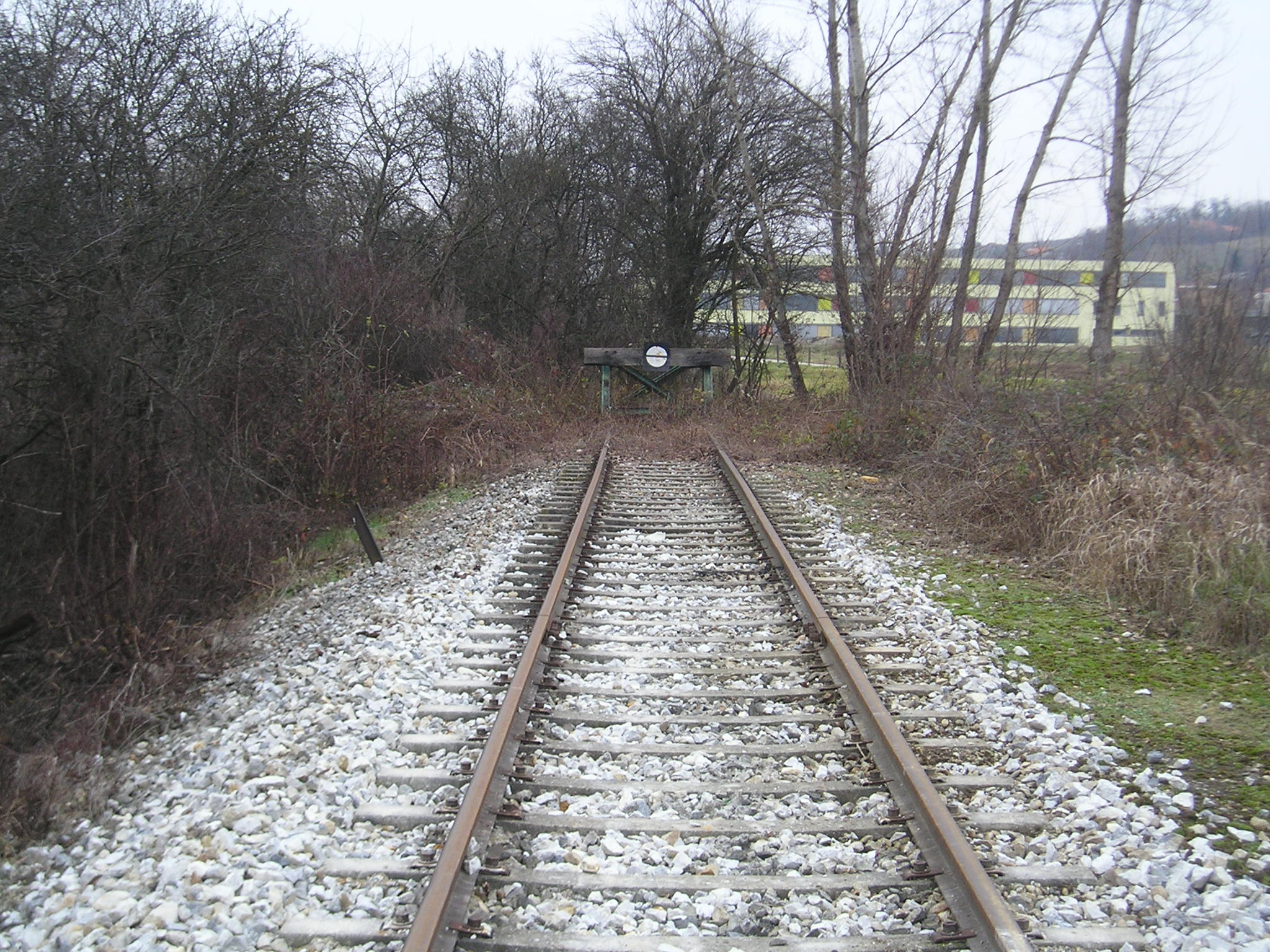
North end of the state border-Lendava railway
