= R201 railway (Croatia) =

Railway line in Croatia

Zaprešić–Čakovec railway
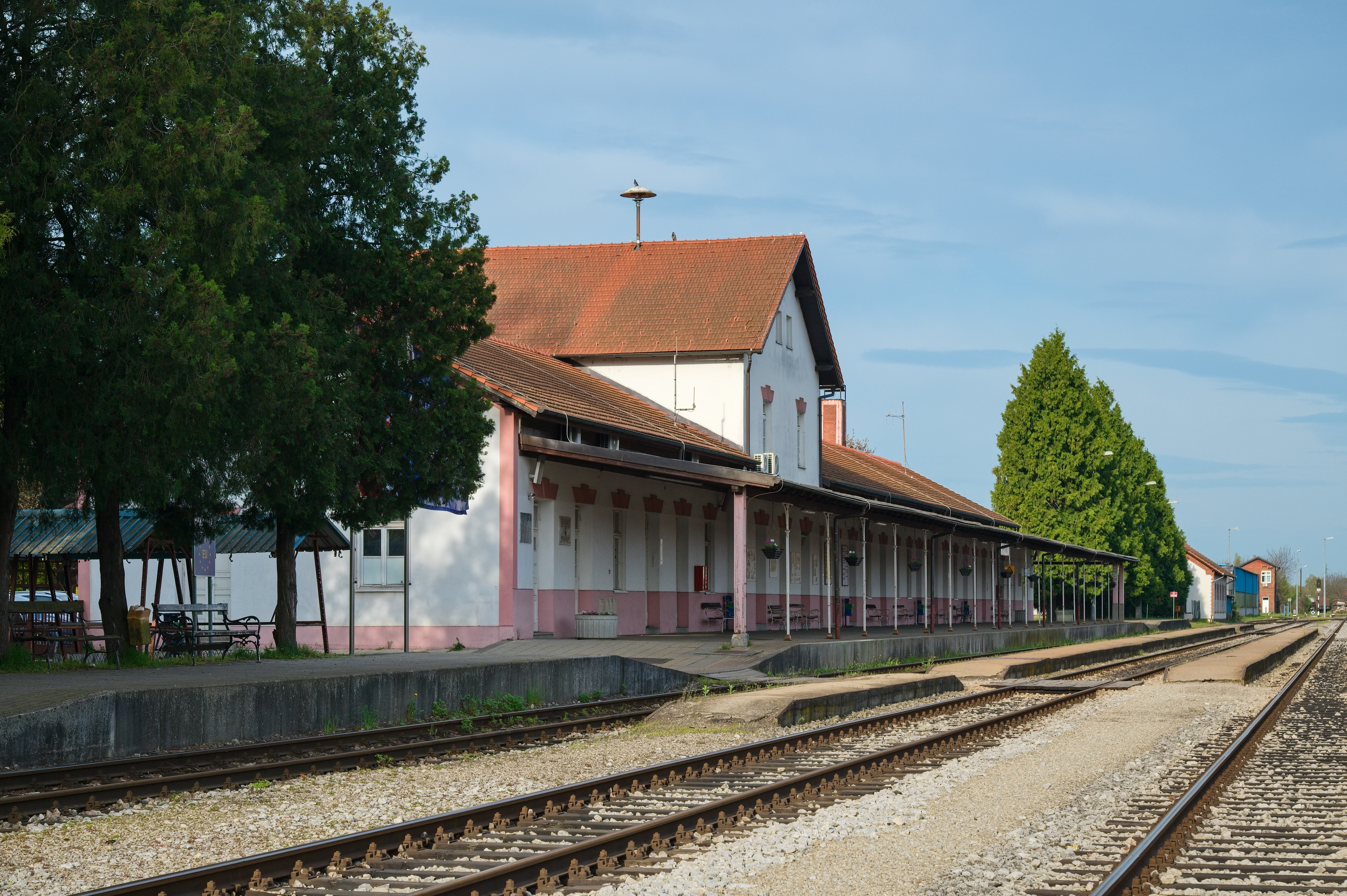
- Čakovec railway station

Overview
- Status: Active
- Owner: HŽ Infrastruktura d.o.o.
- Line number: R201 (HŽ)
- Locale: Zagreb County; Krapina-Zagorje County; Varaždin County; Međimurje County
- Stations: 26

Service
- Type: Regional rail

History
- Opened: September 4, 1886 (Zaprešić-Varaždin); December 13, 1886 (Varaždin-Čakovec)

Technical
- Line length: 100.6 kilometre (62.5 mi)
- Number of tracks: 1
- Track gauge: 1,435 mm (4 ft 8 1/2 in) standard gauge
- Electrification: Zaprešić-Zabok: 25 kV 50 Hz AC; Zabok-Čakovec: non-electrified
- Operating speed: Up to 120 km/h (74.6 mph)

The Zaprešić–Čakovec railway, officially designated as the R201 railway, is a 100.6-kilometre (62.5 mi) partially electrified single-tracked railway line in northwest Croatia that connects the towns of Zaprešić and Čakovec, opened in 1886 in former Kingdom of Croatia-Slavonia. The section between Zaprešić and Zabok is also a branch part of Pan-European Corridor X. Most of the corridor passes through Hrvatsko Zagorje region, connecting the largest part of Međimurje and Hrvatsko Zagorje with Zagreb, spanning through four counties. The line separates at the Zaprešić station from the M101 railway. It is used for passenger (regional) and freight traffic.

The R201 railway also connects to the R106 line (towards Krapina, Đurmanec and Croatia-Slovenia state border) in Zabok, to the L202 line at Hum Lug, the L201 and R202 lines in Varaždin and the M501 and L101 lines in Čakovec.

== Reconstruction of the Zaprešić - Zabok section (2018 - 2021) ==
From 2018 to 2021, the complete section between stations Zaprešić (excluded) and Zabok was modernized/reconstructed, which resulted in splitting of almost all direct passenger lines Zagreb - Zabok - Varaždin - (Čakovec - Kotoriba) in two, as the EMU trains started to cover mostly all lines between Zagreb and Zabok, while DMU trains continued to cover lines on the rest of the track. Reconstruction included following:

- electrification
- improvement of the construction parameters of the railway to designed construction speed of a maximum of 120 km/h
- diversion of the original route to a total of 6 km of track, which reduced the running times of passenger trains by 30 to 50 percent
- reconstruction of the stations Novi Dvori, Luka, Veliko Trgovišće and Zabok, including the construction of new 55-cm high platforms, underpasses, canopies, parking lots, outdoor lighting system, system for audio and video information for the passengers, reconstruction of station buildings
- separation of Zabok station into passenger and freight terminal and construction of a new building for accommodation of signaling, security and telecommunication devices and the office for executive staff
- installation of the new 55-cm high platforms, canopies, outdoor lighting system, access parking lots and a system for audio and video information for the passengers at stop locations
- installation of a new signal-safety and telecommunication devices and devices for remote traffic control on the section
- modernization of the 15 level crossing using modern automatic security and synthetic lifting; redirection of the four crossings with connecting roads to adjacent crossings and abolition of one (in Zabok area)
- arrangement and complete reconstruction of the railway structures such as four new reinforced concrete bridges and the road bridge Horvacka; arrangement of the 35 culverts and canals for drainage works; raising of the retaining / supporting walls in places where it is necessary,

Completion of the section's modernization also marked the end of regular operation of classically compounded passenger trains (railroad cars hauled by separate locomotive) on the corridor, which were, together with DMU trains, an indispensable part of the railway in this area for many years.

== Images of stations ==
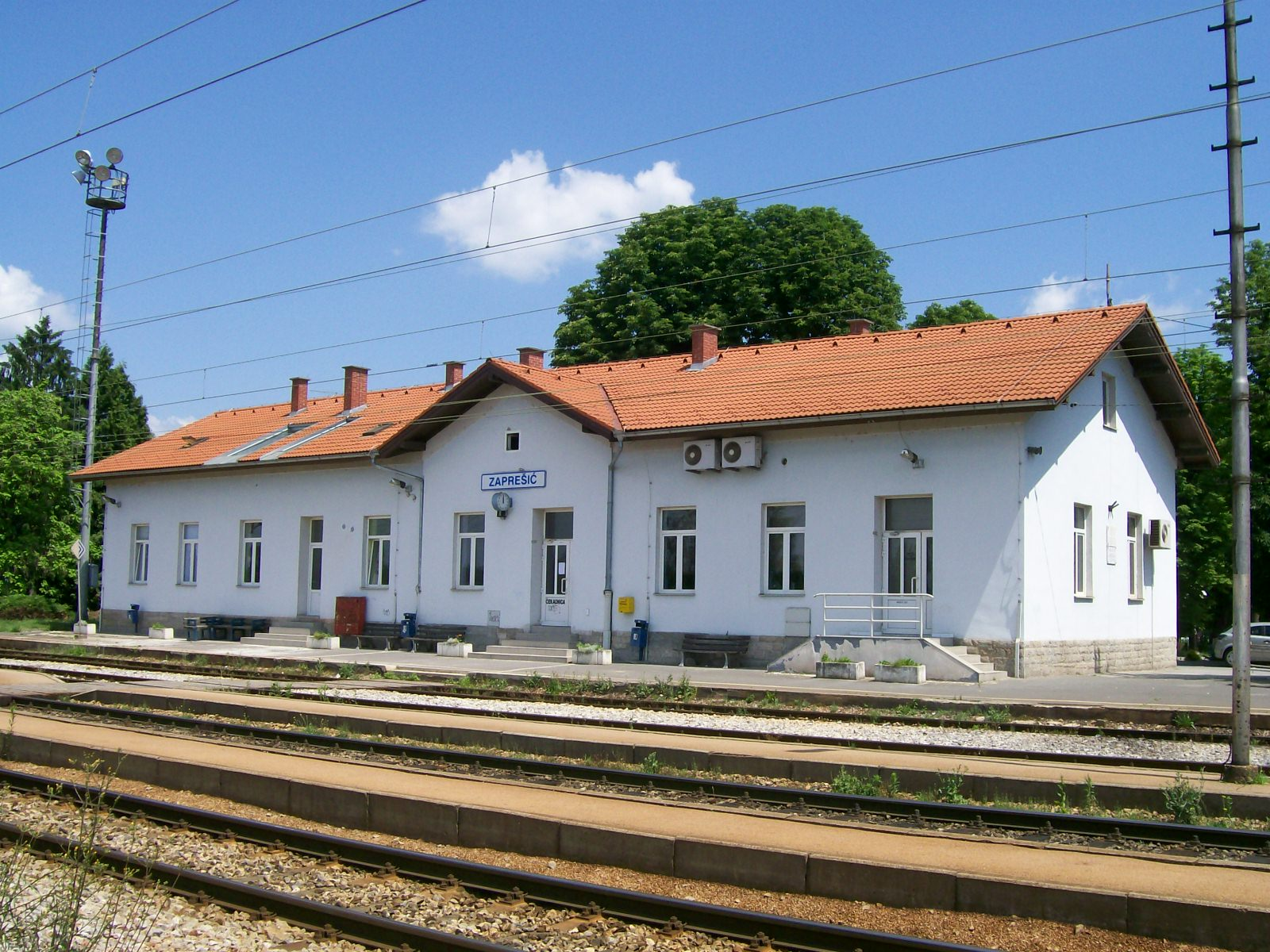
Zaprešić

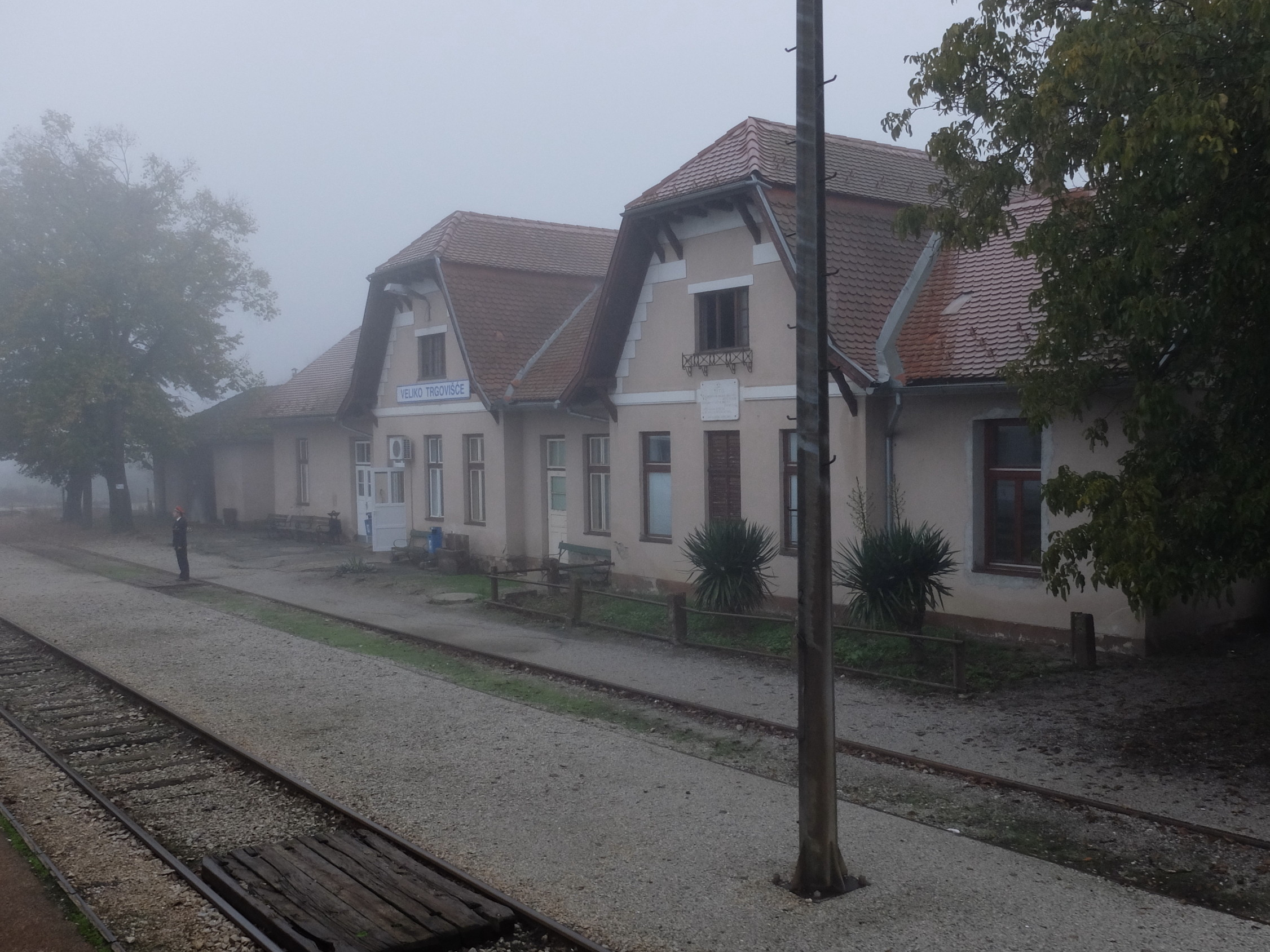
Veliko Trgovišće (view of the station before reconstruction)

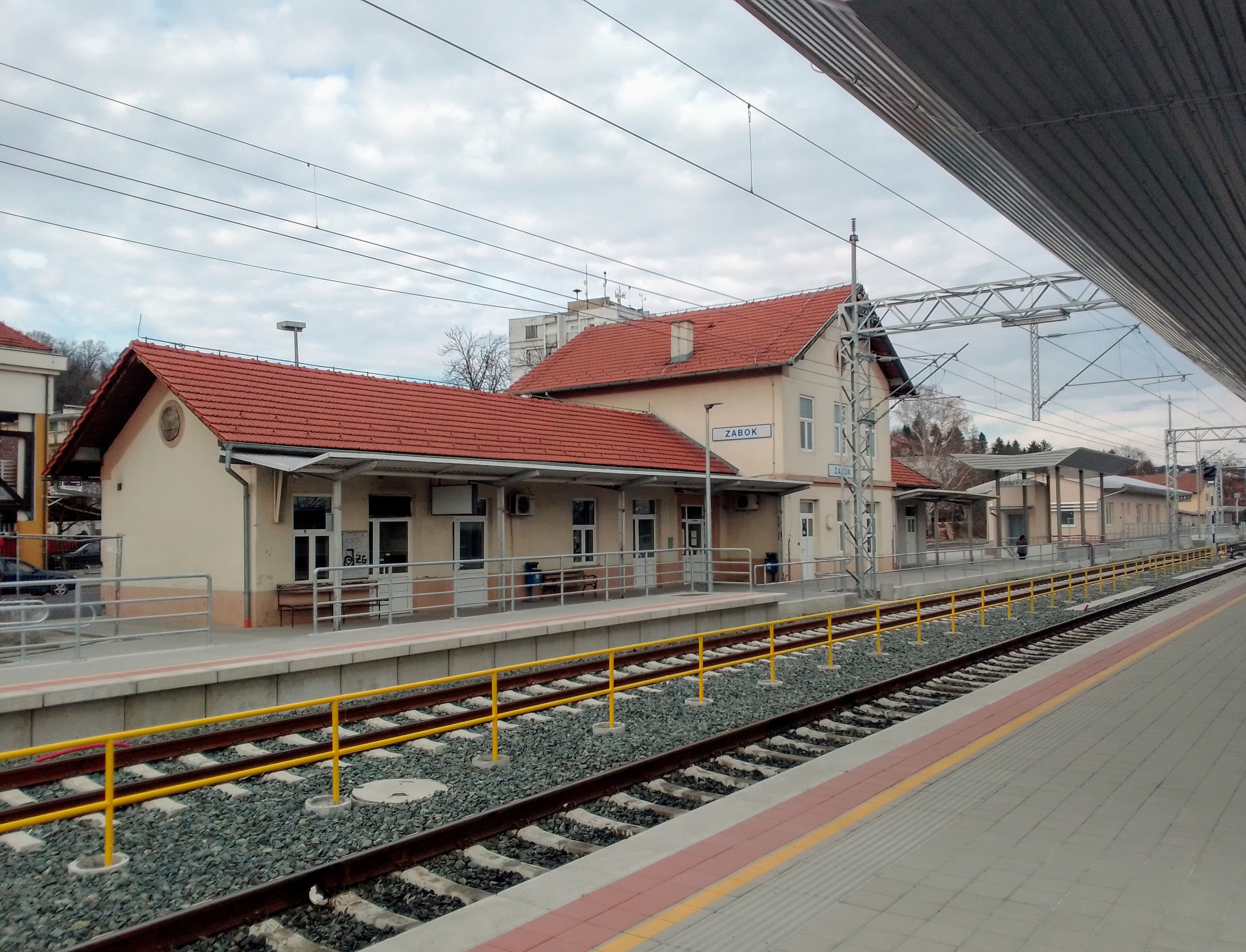
Zabok

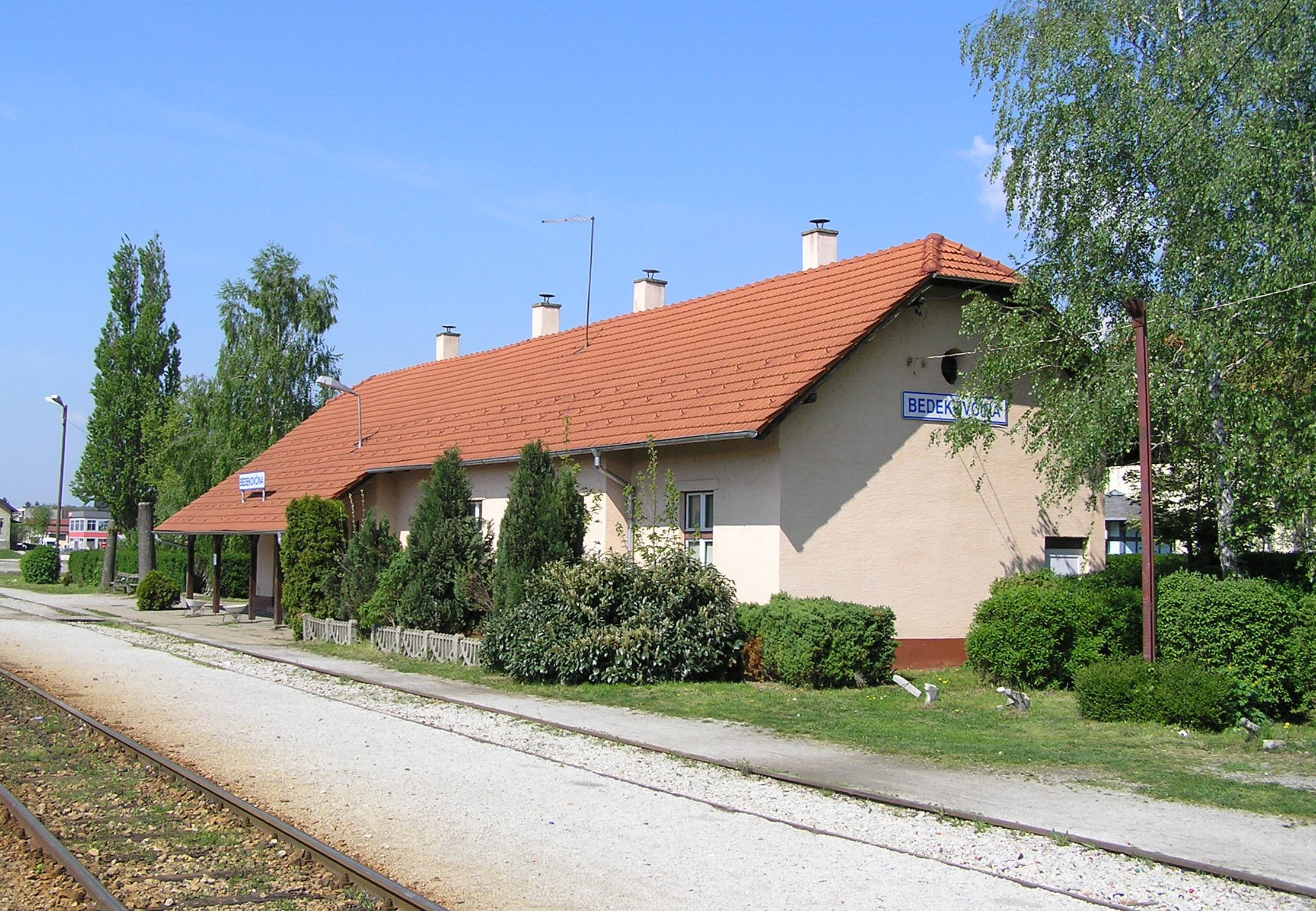
Bedekovčina

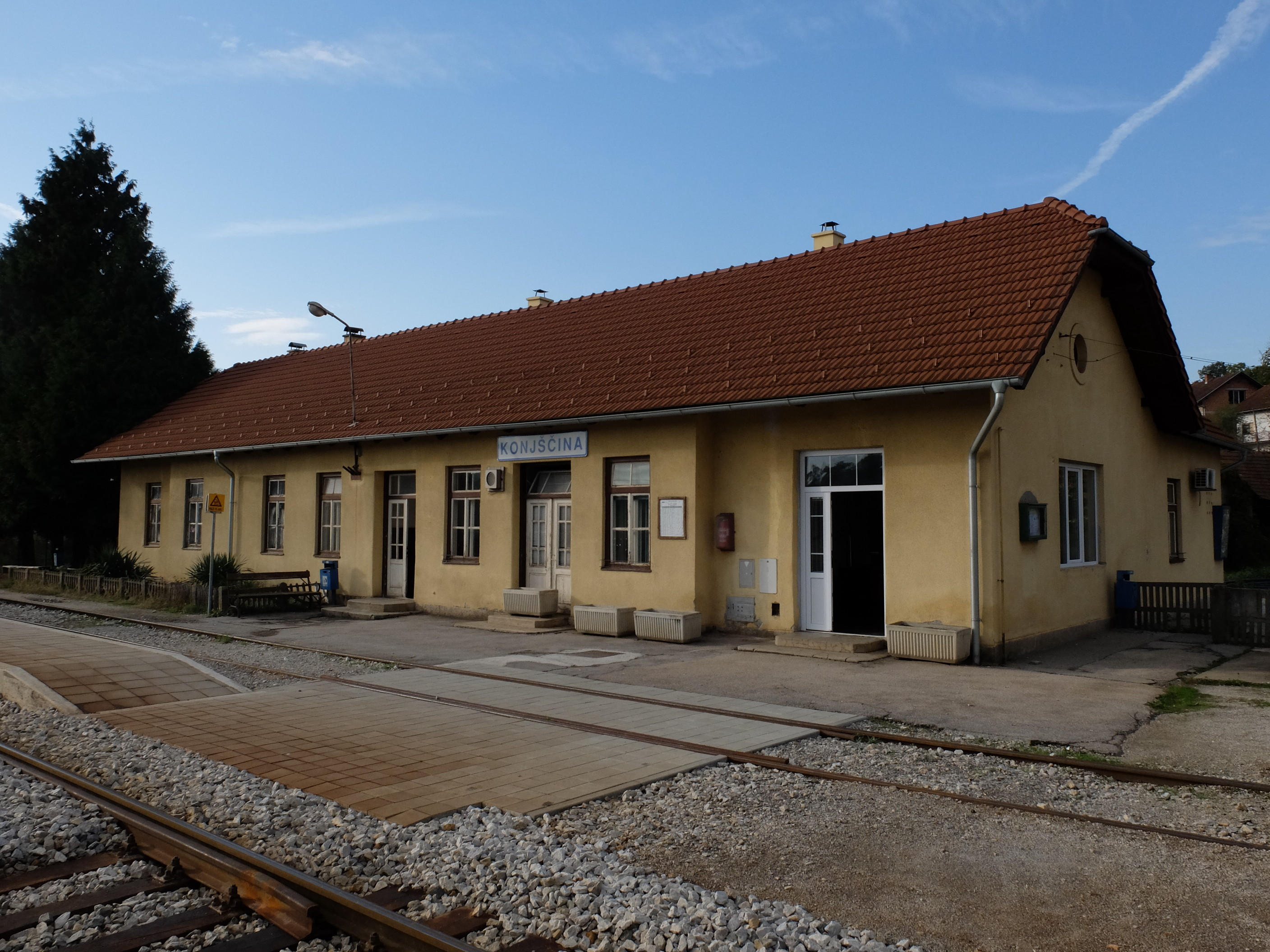
Konjščina

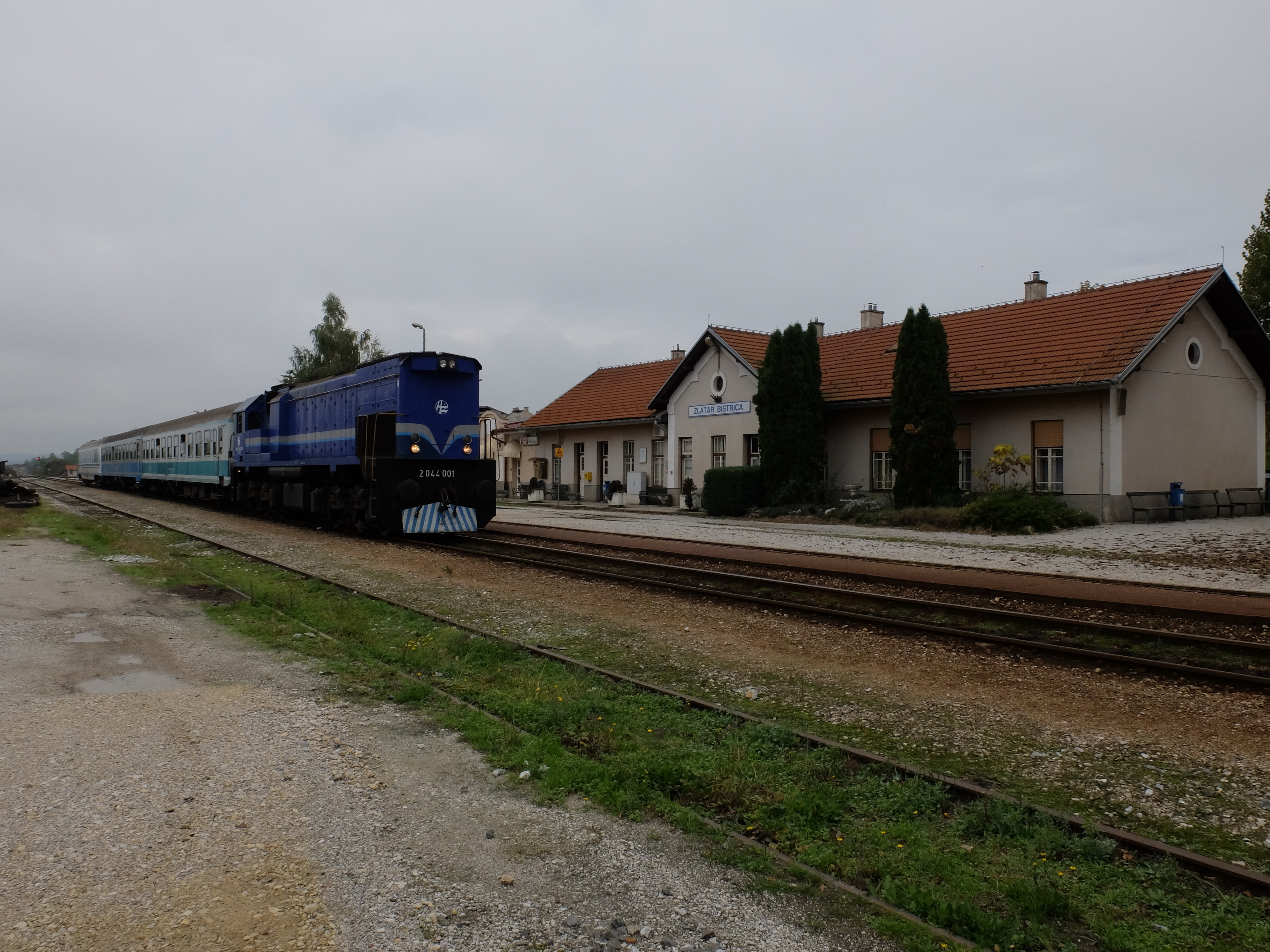
Zlatar Bistrica

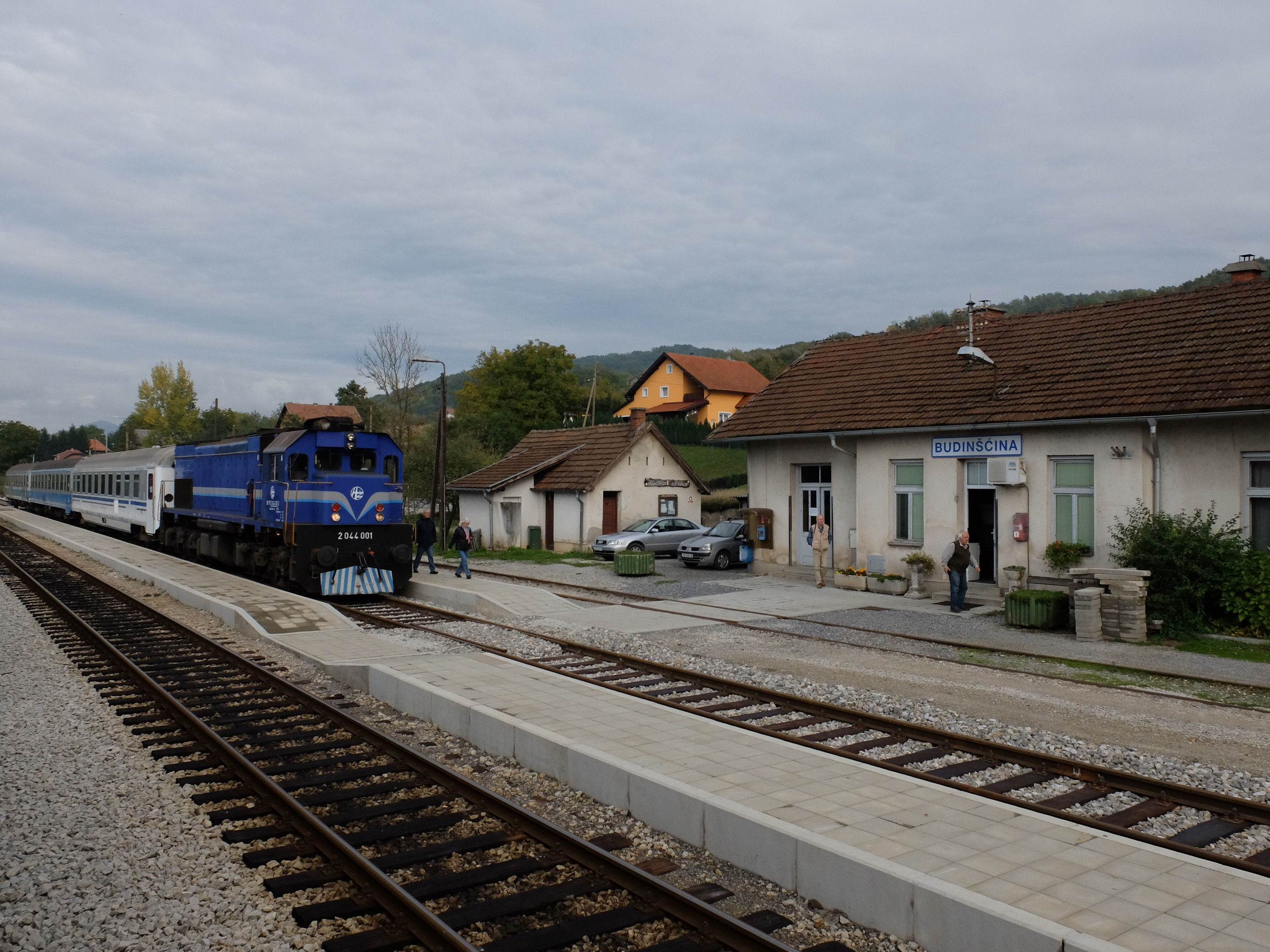
Budinščina

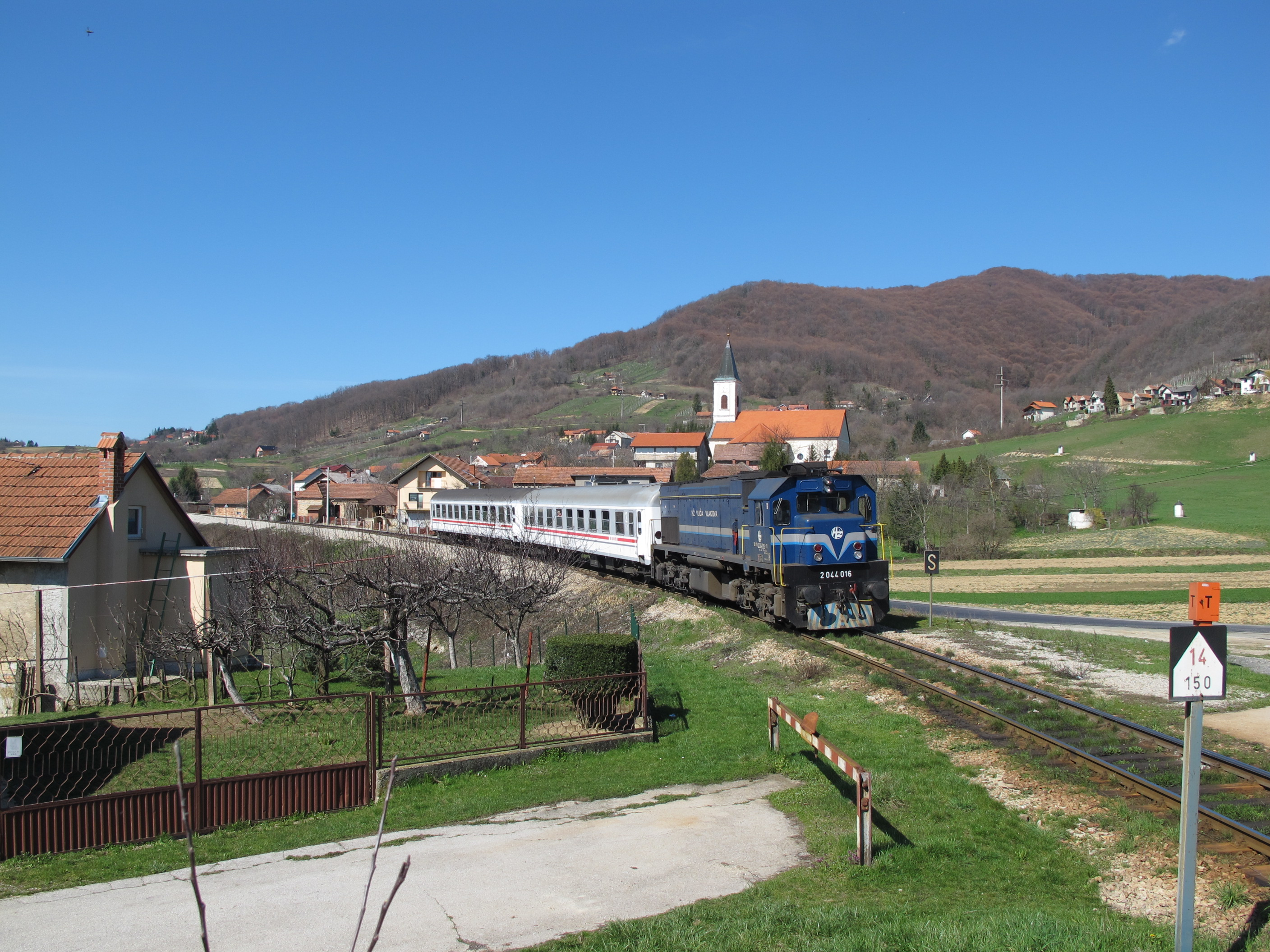
Mađarevo

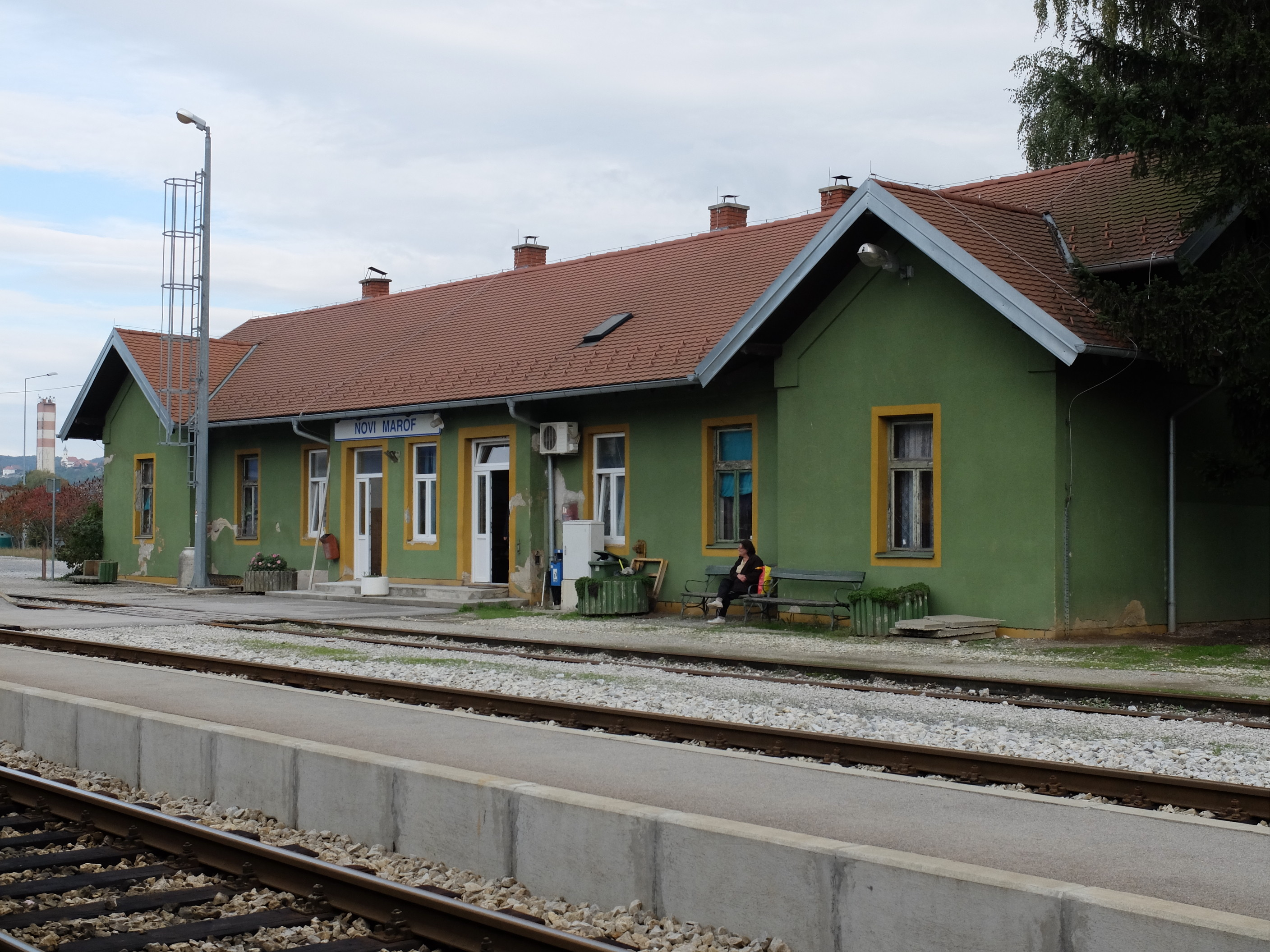
Novi Marof

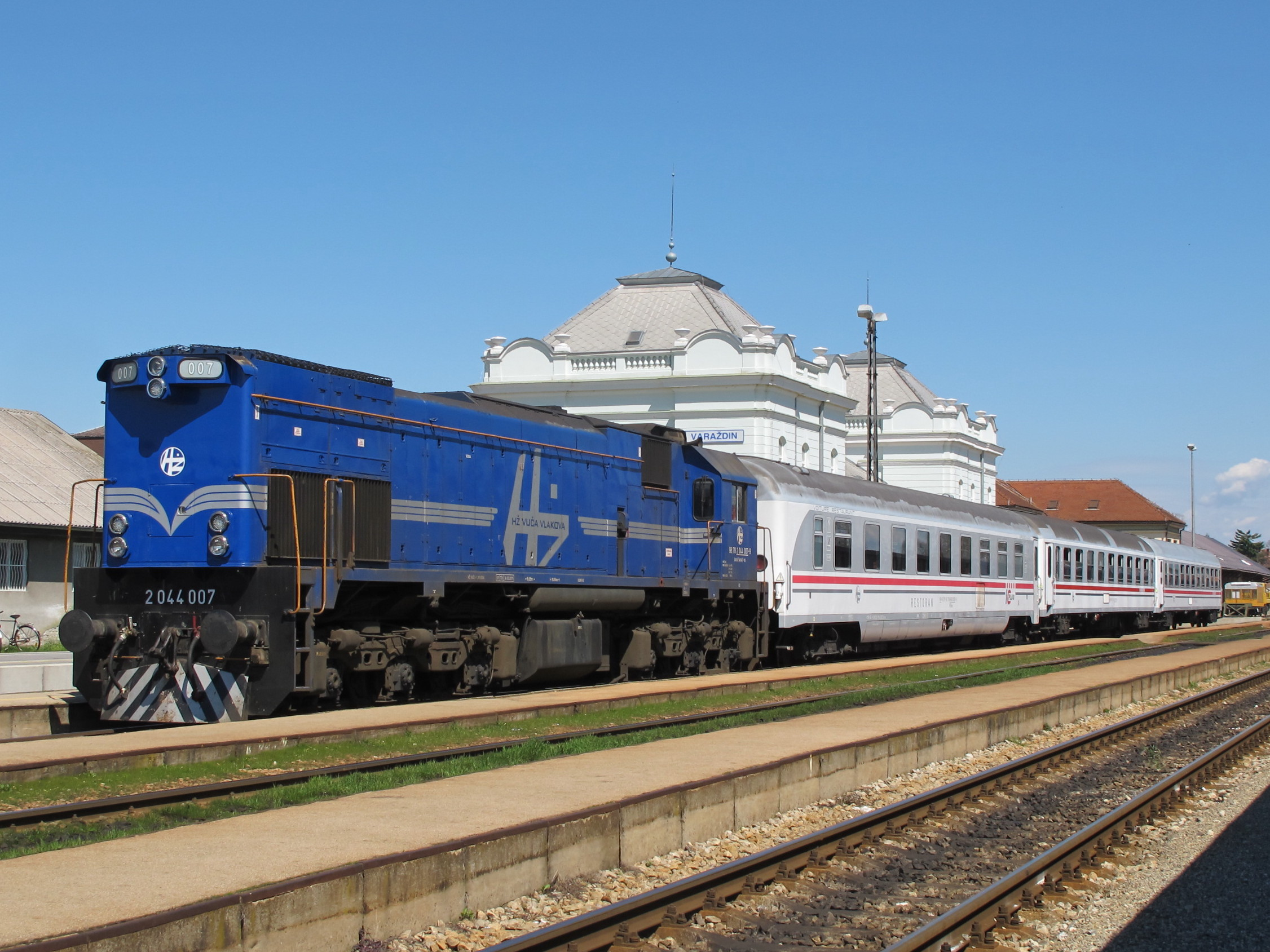
Varaždin

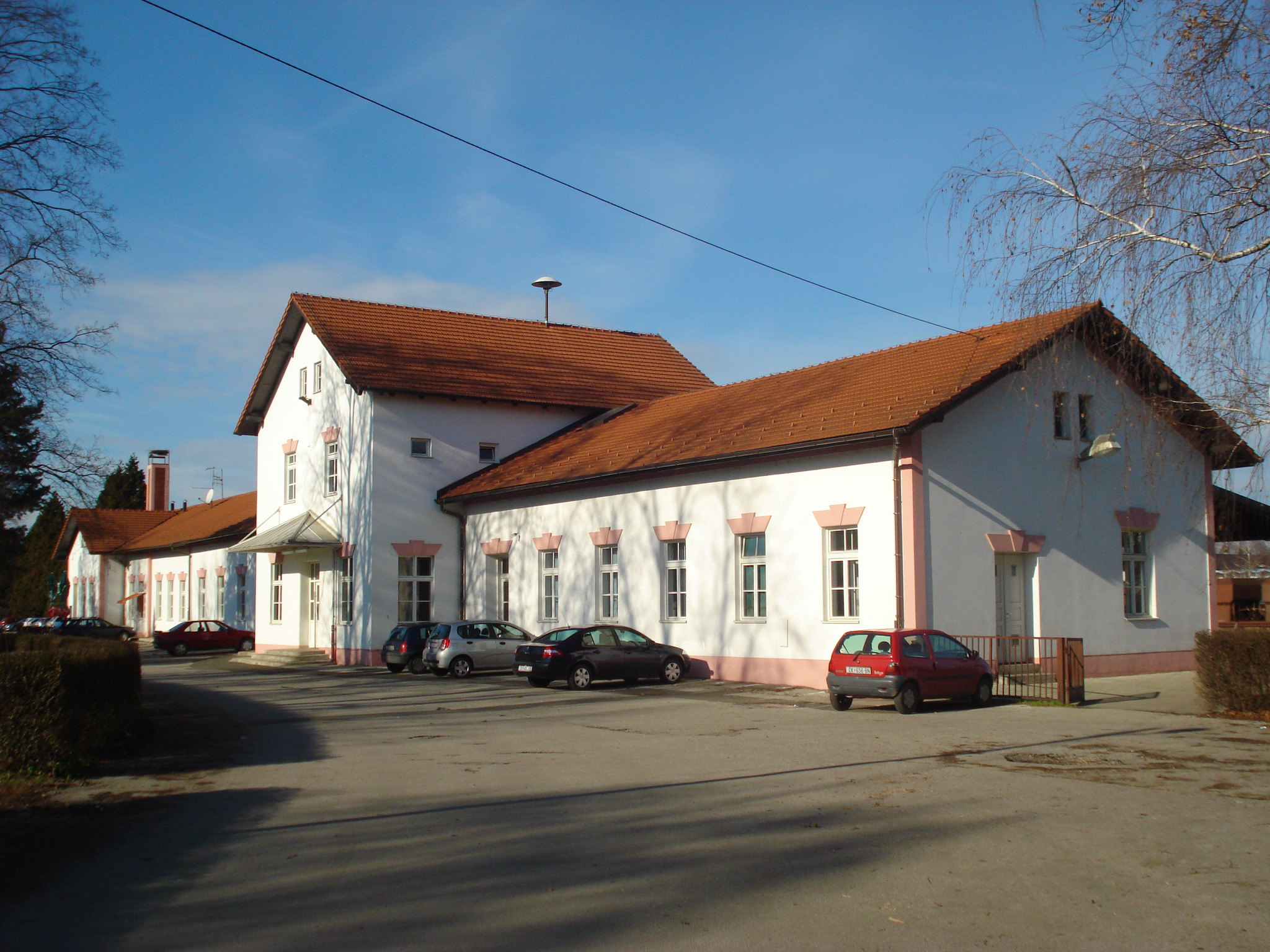
Čakovec
