= Murakeresztúr =

Murakeresztúr Kerestur
- Village
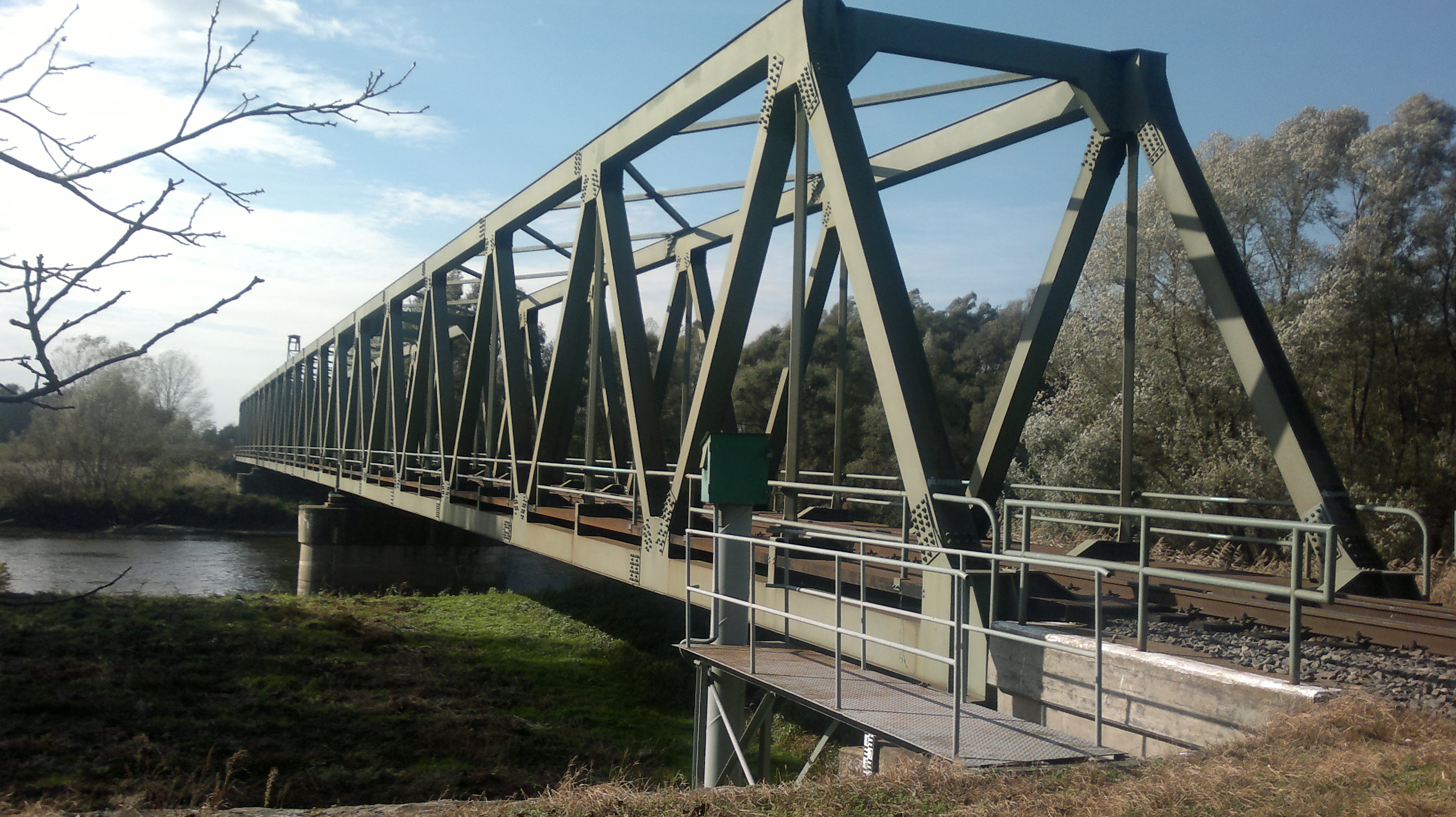
- Border bridge over the Mura river

- Flag Coat of arms
- Interactive map of Murakeresztúr
- Location of Murakeresztúr
- Coordinates: 46.352222°N 16.877778°E
- Country: Hungary
- Region: Western Transdanubia
- County: Zala
- District: Nagykanizsa

Government
  - Mayor: Róbert Polgár (Independent)

Area
  - Total: 11.71 km^{2} (4.52 sq mi)

Population (1 January 2024)
  - Total: 1,511
  - Density: 129.0/km^{2} (334.2/sq mi)
- Time zone: UTC+1 (CET)
  - Summer (DST): UTC+2 (CEST)
- Postal code: 8834
- Area code: (+36) 93
- Website: murakeresztur.hu

Murakeresztúr (Croatian: Kerestur, Krstur or Murski Krstur) is a village in Zala County, Hungary. The village lies on the left bank of the Mura river and is one of the Croatian-language communities along the Mura.

== Geography ==
Murakeresztúr lies on the left-bank plain of the Mura, in the south-western part of Zala County and Hungary, beside the Mura, which serves as the Croatian–Hungarian border river. It is located southwest of Nagykanizsa, 16 kilometres away by road and 13 kilometres by rail along the Budapest–Murakeresztúr railway.

In 2019, the Croatian government decided that a road bridge could be built between Murakeresztúr and Kotor (Kotoriba).

== History ==
The first written mention of the settlement dates from 1347, under the name Keresztur, referring to the Benedictine monastery founded there in honour of the Holy Cross. Nothing is known with certainty about its founding or its founders, though the Hahót clan is sometimes credited. The Hungarian Catholic Lexicon lists the abbey's known abbots: Mihály (1347), Pál (1377), Demeter (1407–34), Dénes (1479), and Mihály (1525–49). Recent research suggests the abbey may have been established as early as the 13th century, most probably in the area surrounding the present-day church.

The 16th-century abbey held four portas, the possession of which was repeatedly disputed between the Széchy family and the abbey. In 1509 the abbey was held by the Zichy family, and in 1542 two officiales of Letenye seized the village together with the abbey. For a time the abbey was united with that of Csatár, sharing a common abbot as late as 1645. The village itself was of little significance due to its poverty, and its serfs were not taxed.

The Ottomans first ravaged the village in 1566, burning it down; the population fled to the surrounding marshy areas. During the Ottoman attack of 1600, the fortress was evacuated, and following the fall of Kanizsa, Keresztúr also came under Ottoman control. In 1661, Új-Zrínyivár (New Zrínyi Castle) was built in the vicinity of the village; in the unrealised plan of Miklós Zrínyi, it was intended to serve the recapture of Kanizsa. A peer-reviewed study has documented the strategic importance of the terrain between the Mura and the Kanizsa Creek (today the Principális Canal) within the present-day municipality, including the ditch connecting the two watercourses that is visible on the First Military Survey of the Habsburg Empire.

By 1693, the empty village's 20 cadastral acres of arable land, 120 of meadow and 70 of forest were being used by people from Légrád and Surd. The land was briefly acquired by Ferenc Gyöngyösi Nagy along with the estates of the Kanizsa castle. In 1720, István Pirkli, parish priest of Légrád, became the owner of Keresztúr; with his death the property passed to the royal treasury, and the abbey was never restored.

Kollátszeg, today a district of Murakeresztúr, was established in the former floodplain of the Mura and the Kanizsa Creek on the site of former fishing and reed-harvester huts. By 1715 only four libertini lived there, as plague and emigration had reduced the population. From 1727 onward, increasing numbers of Croatian families settled there, and by 1770 Kollátszeg had grown into a substantial settlement.

In the 1847 boundary settlement, the distribution of land turned out very unfavourably for the serfs. As a result, on 25 April 1848 the peasants unsuccessfully revolted against their landlord after he had forcibly occupied the village meadows. The War of Independence otherwise passed quietly here; the Croatian-speaking population did not support the army of Ban Josip Jelačić.

Village life began to change rapidly in 1860, when the Southern Railway Company opened a station on its Pécs–Nagykanizsa line. The new abbey church was built on the hill of the former monastery between 1810 and 1818, and was consecrated in honour of the Exaltation of the Holy Cross.

In 1864 (according to some sources, 1874), Kollátszeg was administratively united with Keresztúr; the village was at first called Kollátszeg-Keresztúr, then Murakeresztúr-Kollátszeg, and from 1910 simply Murakeresztúr.

At the time of the Treaty of Trianon, the Croatian population was also more closely tied to Hungary, but the decision still affected them deeply, as many had family and economic ties to the Međimurje and Croatian areas assigned to the Kingdom of Serbs, Croats and Slovenes.

After the Second World War, the village's nationality composition, its proximity to the border, and the poor state of Yugoslav–Hungarian relations all worsened its situation; significant change did not occur until the 1960s, and the population declined. A new school and kindergarten were built in 1962, and a flood-protection system was completed by 1969. In 1970, the railway bridge over the Mura was rebuilt, becoming part of an important rail line — primarily for freight — leading toward Yugoslavia.

Murakeresztúr remains one of the principal railway border crossings between Croatia and Hungary, and the section between Čakovec and Murakeresztúr is still operated with frequent daily passenger services. During the European migrant crisis in 2015–16, the Murakeresztúr–Kotoriba crossing was one of three railway crossings between Hungary and Croatia temporarily closed by the Hungarian government.

== Public life ==
=== Mayors ===
- 1990–1994: Dr. József Béli (FKgP)
- 1994–1998: József Kassai (Independent)
- 1998–2019: Lajos József Pavlicz (Independent)
- 2019–present: Róbert Polgár (Independent)

The village has a primary school, a kindergarten, a doctor's and dentist's surgery, a post office, police station, customs office, fire service, and a civil guard.

== Demographics ==
At the time of the 2011 census, the ethnic composition was: Hungarian 71.8%, Roma 4.1%, Croatian 23%, German 0.57%. Of the inhabitants, 78.5% declared themselves Roman Catholic, 0.34% Reformed, 0.4% Lutheran, and 2% non-denominational (18.1% did not respond).

In 2022, 94.6% of the population declared themselves Hungarian, 20.7% Croatian, 3% Roma, 0.9% German, and 0.1% each Polish, Greek, Slovene, Armenian, Ukrainian and Romanian; 1.1% declared themselves of other, non-domestic nationality (4.8% did not respond; due to dual identities, the total may exceed 100%). By religion, 59.6% were Roman Catholic, 0.6% Reformed, 0.4% Lutheran, 0.7% other Christian, 1.4% other Catholic, and 5.8% non-denominational (31.5% did not respond).

== Sights ==
- Exaltation of the Holy Cross abbey church, built 1810–1818 on the hill of the former monastery
- Statue of Miklós Zrínyi, in front of the primary school
- Memento Memorial — a Second World War memorial standing next to the Mura bridge since 1975, constructed from materials of the former exploded crossing
