= Pragersko–Središče Railway =

Railway line in Slovenia

Pragersko-Budapest railway

Overview
- Line number: 40, 44 (SŽ)

Technical
- Line length: 51.9 km (32.2 mi)
- Track gauge: 1435 mm
- Operating speed: 120 km/h (74.6 mph) max.

The Pragersko–Središče Railway is a 51.888-kilometre (32.242 mi) long railway in Slovenia that connects the Slovenian town Pragersko with the Croatian railway network west of Čakovec. The 40.273-kilometre (25.024 mi) Pragersko-Ormož section of the railway, officially designated as railway number 40 is part of the Pan-European Corridor V, which runs from Venice to Kyiv. The remaining 11.615 kilometres (7.217 miles) between Ormož and Croatian–Slovene border east of Središče ob Dravi is classified as line number 44. The railway is mostly single-tracked and non-electrified.

== History ==
The construction of this railway was planned by the Emperor-Franz-Joseph Orient-Railway, which was merged in 1858 with the Austrian Southern Railway Company. On 24 April 1860, it was opened for traffic by the Southern Railway as a part of the railway from Kanizsa to Pragerhof.

== Gallery ==
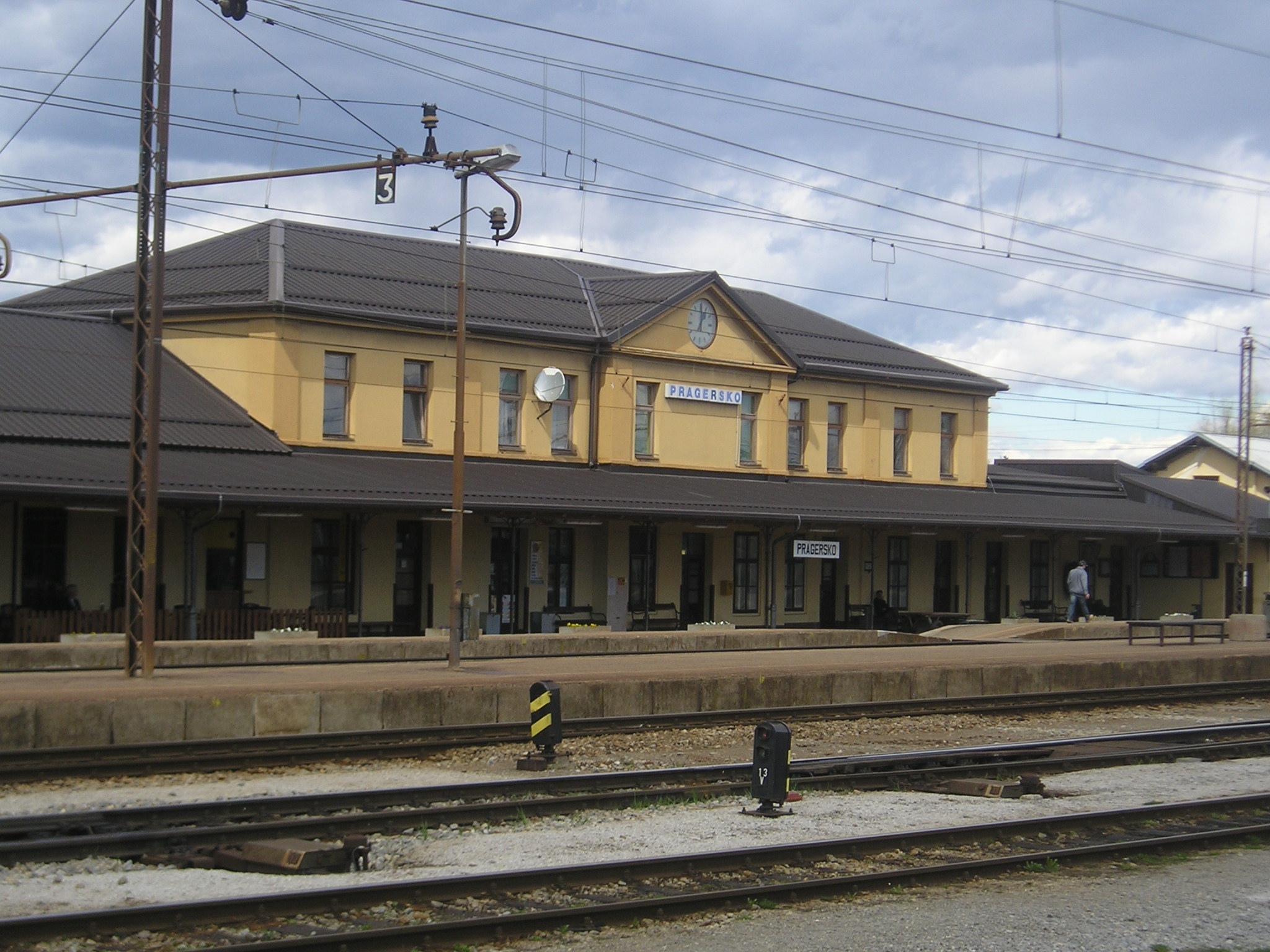
Pragersko railway station

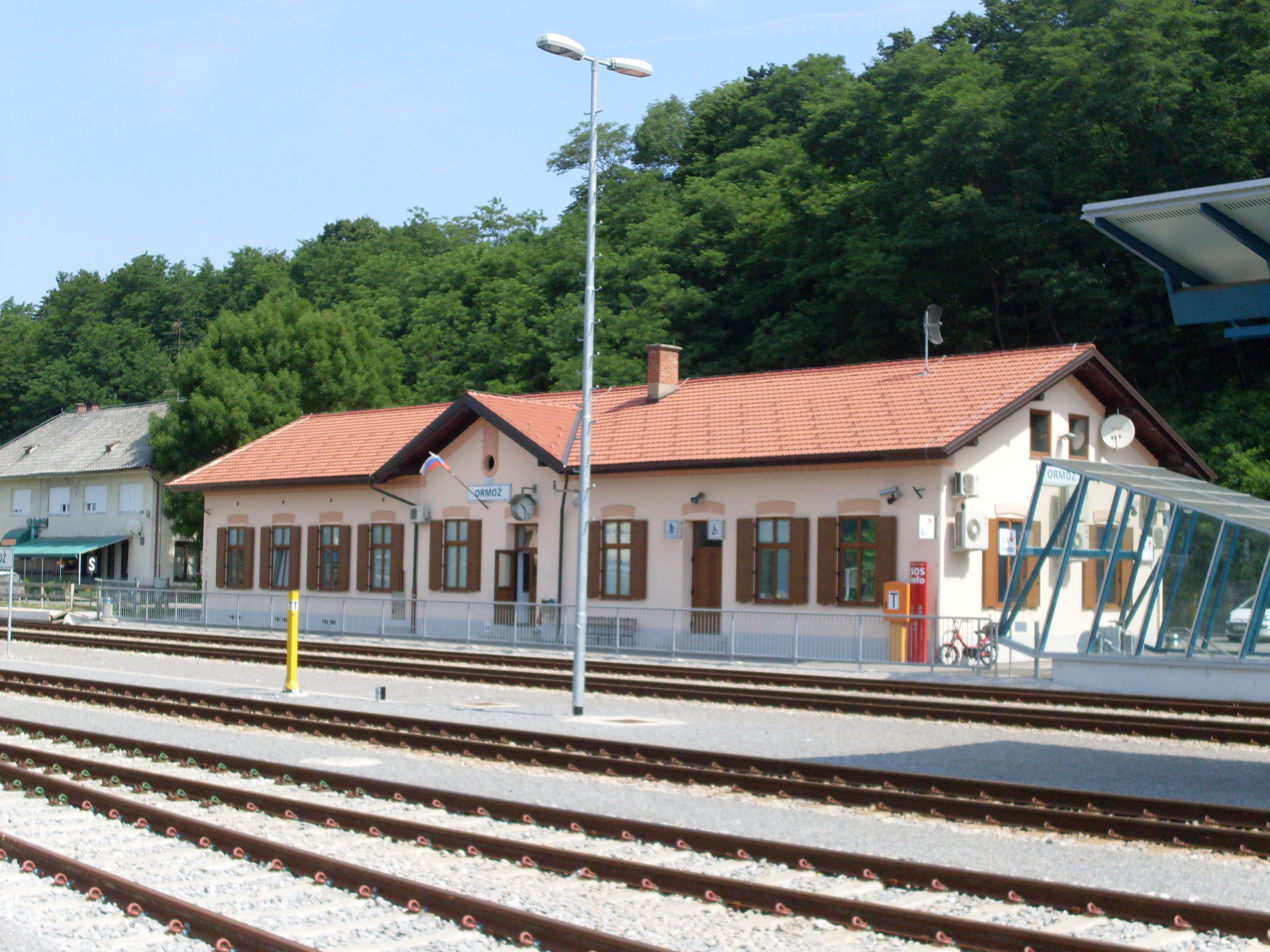
Ormož railway station
