= Pragersko =

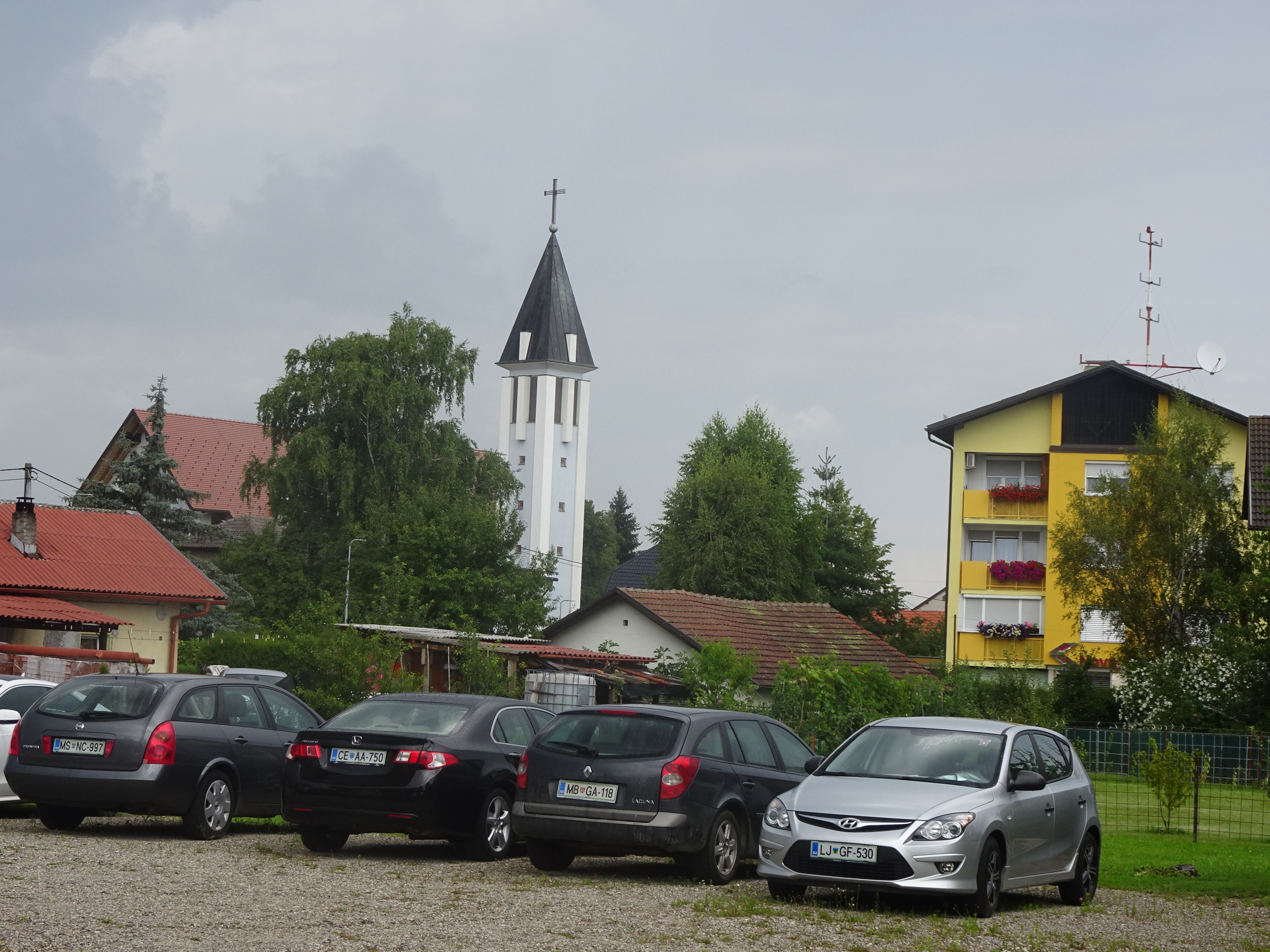

- Location in Slovenia
- Coordinates: 46°23′43.92″N 15°39′41.01″E
- Country: Slovenia
- Traditional region: Styria
- Statistical region: Drava
- Municipality: Slovenska Bistrica

Area
  - Total: 5.43 km^{2} (2.10 sq mi)
- Elevation: 249.8 m (820 ft)

Population (2002)
  - Total: 1,101

Pragersko (pronounced [ˈpɾaːɡɛɾskɔ], in older sources Pragarsko, German: Pragerhof) is a small town in the Municipality of Slovenska Bistrica in northeastern Slovenia.

== History ==
The former Austrian Southern Railway from Vienna to Ljubljana and Sežana runs through the settlement. It was only after the building of the Southern Railway in the mid-19th century that the town developed to its current size. The area is part of the traditional region of Styria. It is now included with the rest of the municipality in the Drava Statistical Region.
