= Rijeka railway station =

Railway station in Croatia

Rijeka
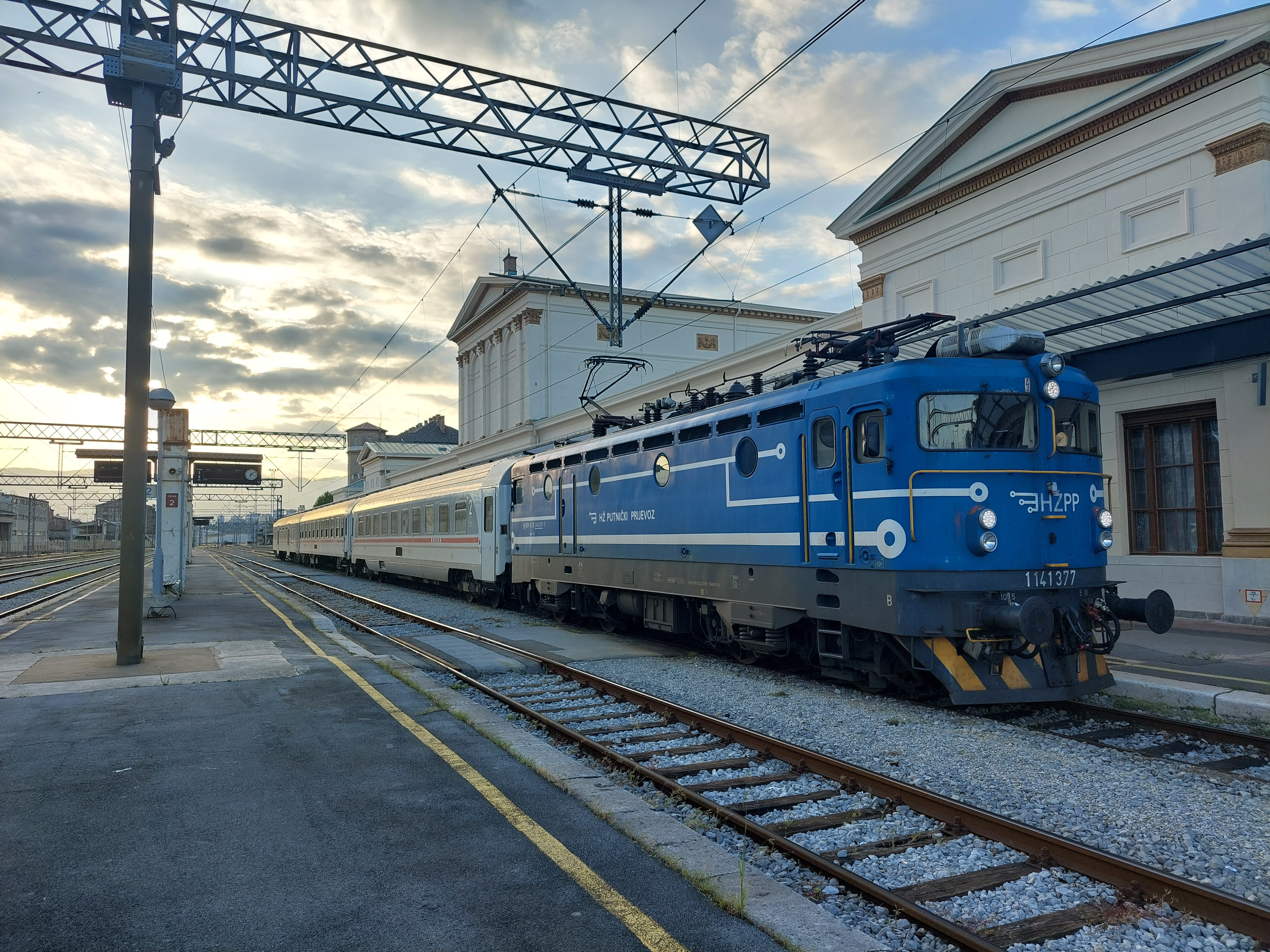
- Station building and Platform 2

General information
- Location: Trg kralja Tomislava 1 Rijeka; Croatia
- Coordinates: 45°19′49″N 14°25′50″E
- Operator: HŽ Infrastruktura
- Lines: M203 railway, M202 railway
- Tracks: 4

Construction
- Structure type: Through station
- Architect: Ferenc Pfaff
- Architectural style: Neoclassicism

History
- Opened: June 25, 1873
- Rebuilt: 1891
- Electrified: 1936
- Former names: Fiume

Key dates
- 2021–2023: Construction and modernisation

Connecting services
ÖBB Nightjet
Location

The Rijeka railway station (Croatian: Željeznički kolodvor Rijeka) is a main railway station in Rijeka, Croatia, opened in 1873 and is close to the port of Rijeka. It is operated by Croatian Railways (HŽ).

== History ==
Following the Croatian–Hungarian Settlement of 1868 the Free State of Fiume was given a special status in Croatia's personal union with Hungary, as well as forcing the expansion of the Port of Rijeka in the form of making it the main commercial port of the Kingdom of Hungary.

In 1873 the railway routes coming from Budapest via Zagreb and Karlovac as well as from Vienna via Ljubljana & Pivka to Rijeka were finished and the station was opened on the 25 June 1873. A year later a direct rail connection to Trieste was established.

In 1882 one of Europe's first oil refineries was founded in Rijeka, and during the 1880s the port and station were expanded with new warehouses. The station building as it stands today was built from 1889 to 1891 after plans of the Budapestian architect Ferenc Pfaff, who build 14 station buildings in total in the Hungarian countries. The neoclassical building comprises a 150 m long single-storey arcaded building, a two-storey, centrally placed entrance hall, as well as two head-end buildings placed on its side. Today the station building is under preservation order because of its architectural qualities. In 1899 Rijeka got an electrical tram system which connected the train station and Rijeka's districts.

After the first world war the city was annexed by the Kingdom of Italy and the station became a border station under ownership of the Ferrovie dello Stato Italiane who electrified the Rijeka-Pivka line with a 3000 V DC system. After the second world war the station was connected to the network of the Yugoslav Railways (JŽ) and since 1991 it's owned by the Croatian Railways (HŽ) with their founding.
