= Ferenc Pfaff =

Hungarian architect, teacher

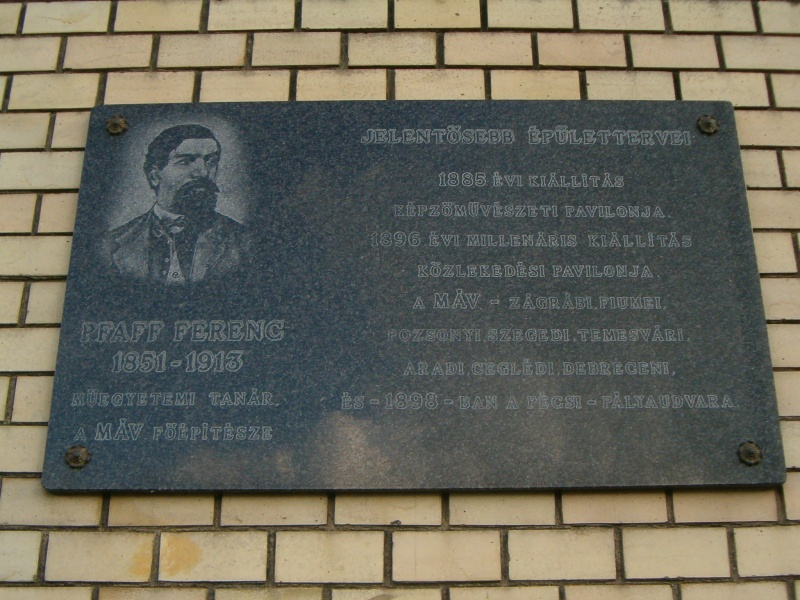
- Memorial plaque of Ferenc Pfaff at Pécs railway station
- Born: Franz Pfaff; 19 November 1851; Mohács, Kingdom of Hungary, Austrian Empire
- Died: 21 August 1913; Budapest, Austria-Hungary
- Education: Technical University of Budapest
- Occupation: Architect

Ferenc Pfaff (born Franz Pfaff; 19 November 1851 – 21 August 1913) was a Hungarian chief architect of the MÁV and professor at the Budapest University of Technology and Economics.

== Early life and education ==
Pfaff was born on 19 November 1851 in Mohács, Kingdom of Hungary. Following the early death of his father, he was raised by his mother. He completed secondary education before locally enrolling in 1871 at the József Nádor Technical University in Budapest (now Budapest University of Technology and Economics), one of the earliest institutions granted full university status for technical education worldwide. Under the guidance of architect Imre Steindl, Pfaff studied architecture in the university's Engineering Department.

Pfaff actively participated in the university’s summer architectural survey camps, gaining practical experience early in his career. After graduating in 1880, he remained at the university as an assistant professor and later as a private tutor, working closely with Steindl.

One of their last collaborations was the design of customs houses on Margaret Bridge in Budapest, for which Pfaff is believed to have prepared most of the plans independently. Despite his growing reputation, Pfaff came to realize he would remain in Steindl’s control, forming his path towards a distinguished but somewhat understated career.

== Career ==
Following his graduation from architecture school, Pfaff started working as a professional architect, creating smaller-scale structures such as the 1886 completion of the Roman Catholic church in Svábhegy. His work quickly caught the interest of the Hungarian State Railways (MÁV), and he was appointed head architect of the railway business in 1887, a role in which he served for over two decades.

The rapid expansion and modernization of railway infrastructure throughout the Austro-Hungarian Empire occurred during Pfaff's time at MÁV. He was in charge of the design, adaption, and renovation of over twenty major station buildings as well as many smaller regional and suburban stations across Hungary and the larger imperial regions in his capacity as chief architect and later director of building works.

His design philosophy was in line with the dominant eclectic tradition, particularly the use of regional Hungarian vernacular elements in conjunction with Renaissance revival motifs. Pfaff placed a strong emphasis on keeping balanced proportions and tasteful decoration while emphasizing logical spatial arrangement for passenger movement and operating efficiency. Throughout the MÁV network, this equilibrium made sure that stations were both operational and aesthetically consistent.

Pfaff oversaw repair and enlargement work in Győr, Košice (Kassa), Debrecen, and other regional centers, updating older station structures to accommodate telegraph installations, greater traffic, and changing train stock sizes. His work helped create a unifying MÁV architectural character that blended local contexts with imperial requirements.

Pfaff's MÁV career established him as an architect who shaped Hungary's railway heritage without excessive ornamentation, resulting in station buildings that are still in use or preserved as heritage landmarks. He also participated in urban planning consultations for railway-linked developments and contributed to industrial architecture exhibitions.

== Railway stations ==
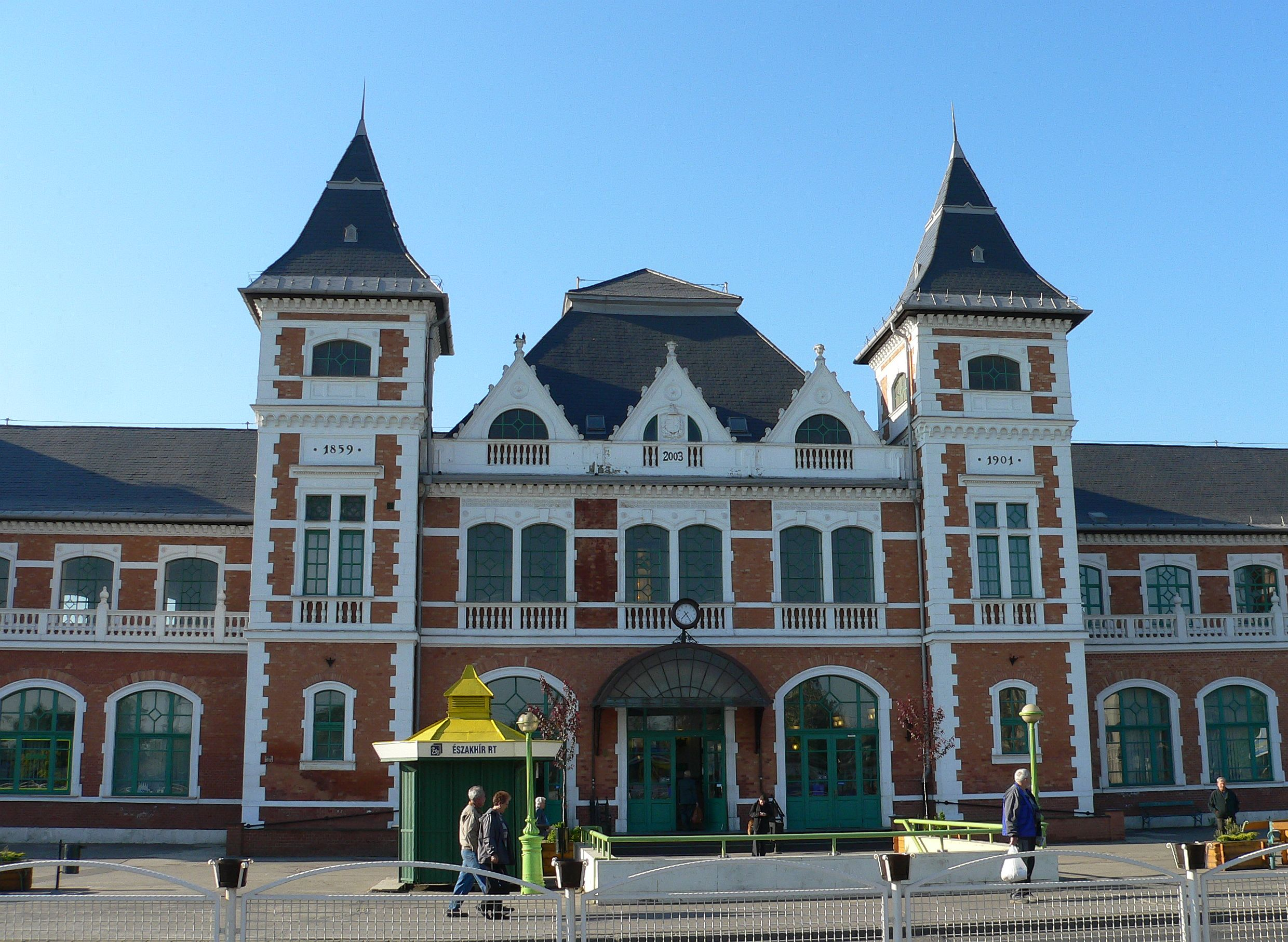
Tiszai railway station in Miskolc

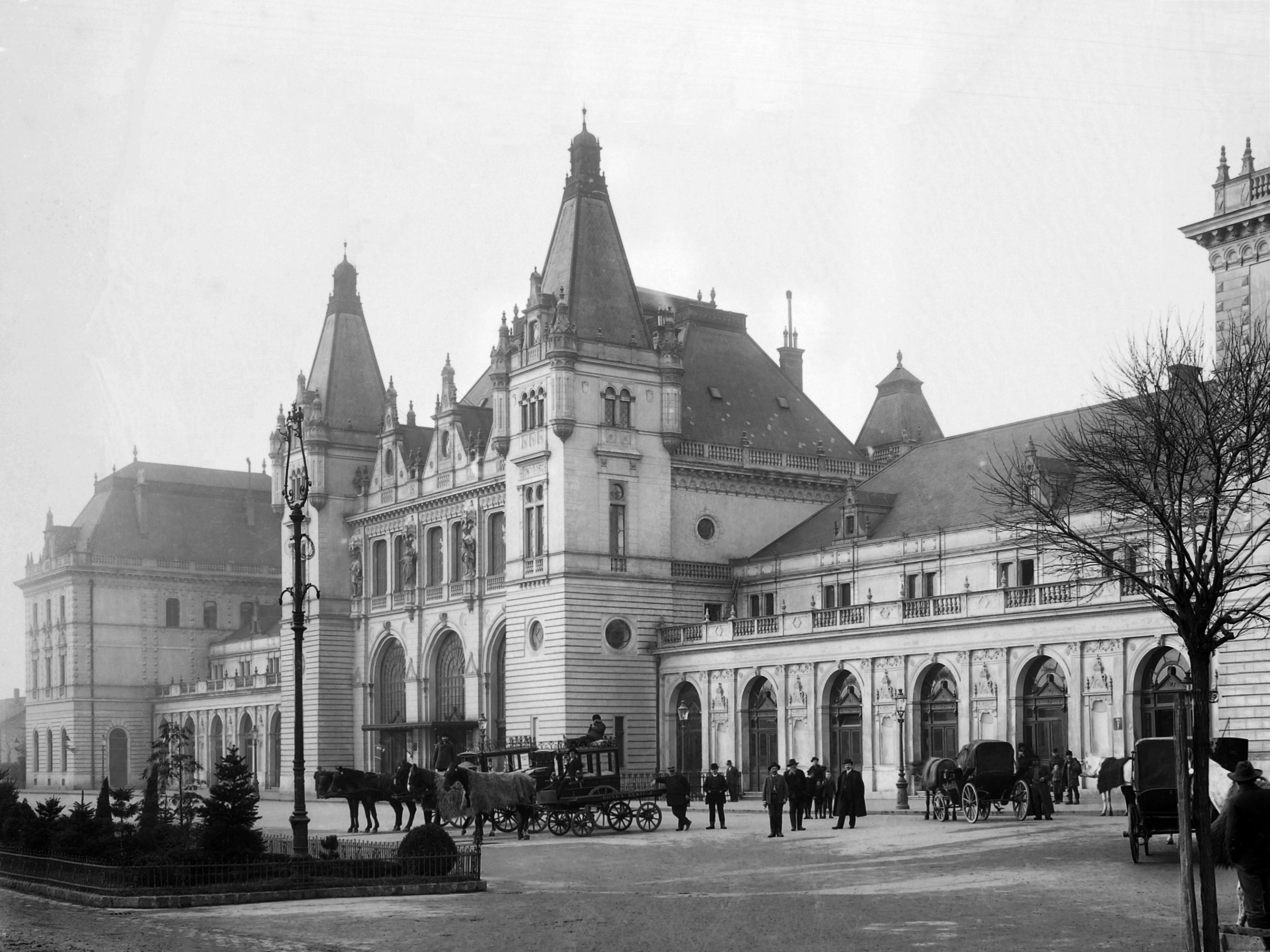
Iosefin railway station, Timișoara

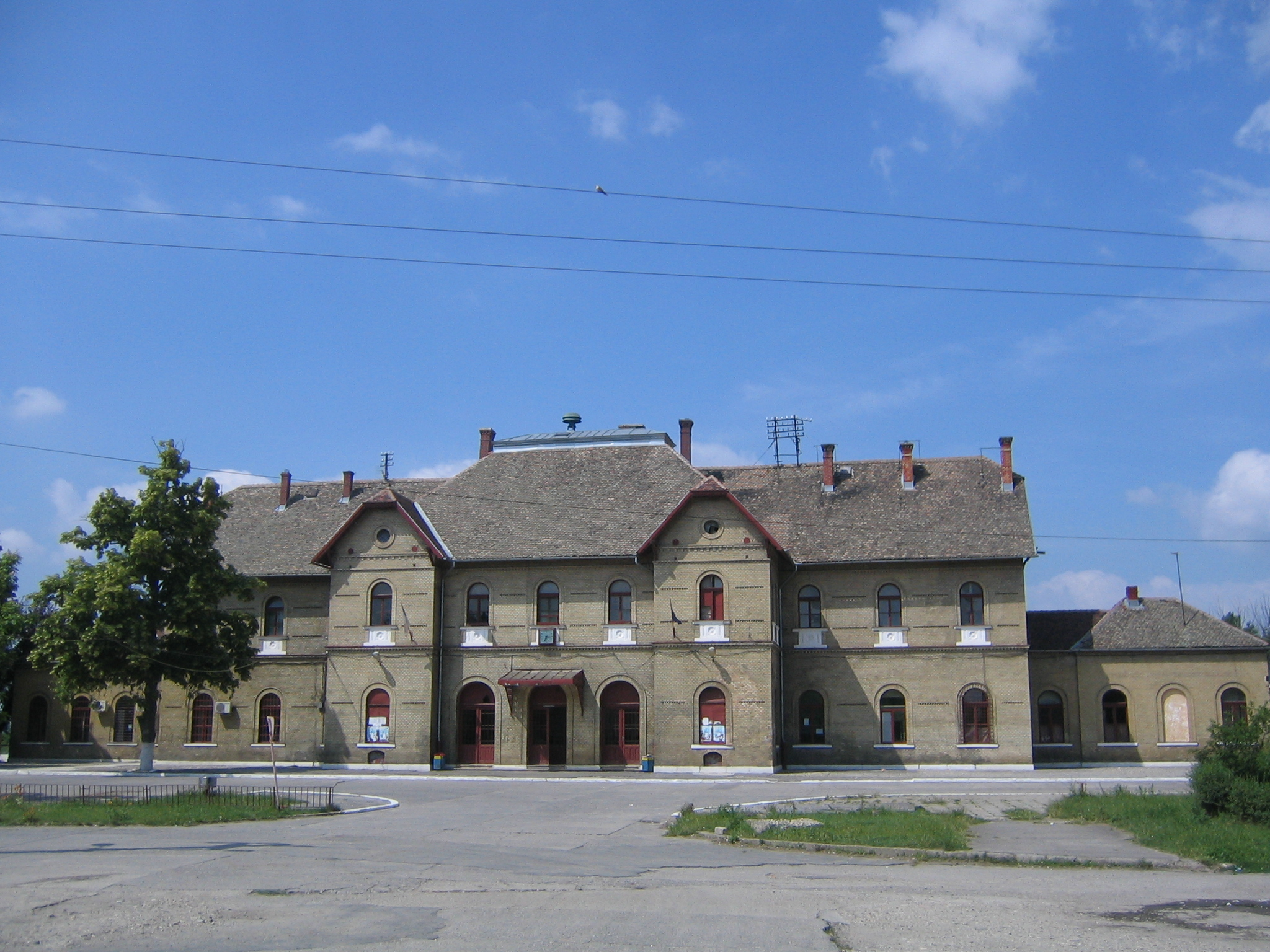
Jimbolia railway station

- Arad
- Bratislava main railway station, 1905
- Carei
- Celldömölk
- Cluj-Napoca
- Chop
- Debrecen
- Füzesabony, 1893
- Gyimesbükk (Ghimeș-Făget)
- Győr (remodelling)
- Jimbolia
- Kaposvár
- Karlovac
- Košice (remodelling)
- Leopoldov
- Miskolc Gömöri railway station, 1899
- Miskolc Tiszai railway station, 1901 (remodelled)
- Osijek
- Pécs, (1900)
- Rijeka, 1890
- Satu Mare, 1899
- Szeged, 1902 – restored in 2006 according to his original plans
- Timișoara Iosefin, 1897
- Vršac
- Zagreb Glavni railway station

== Other buildings ==
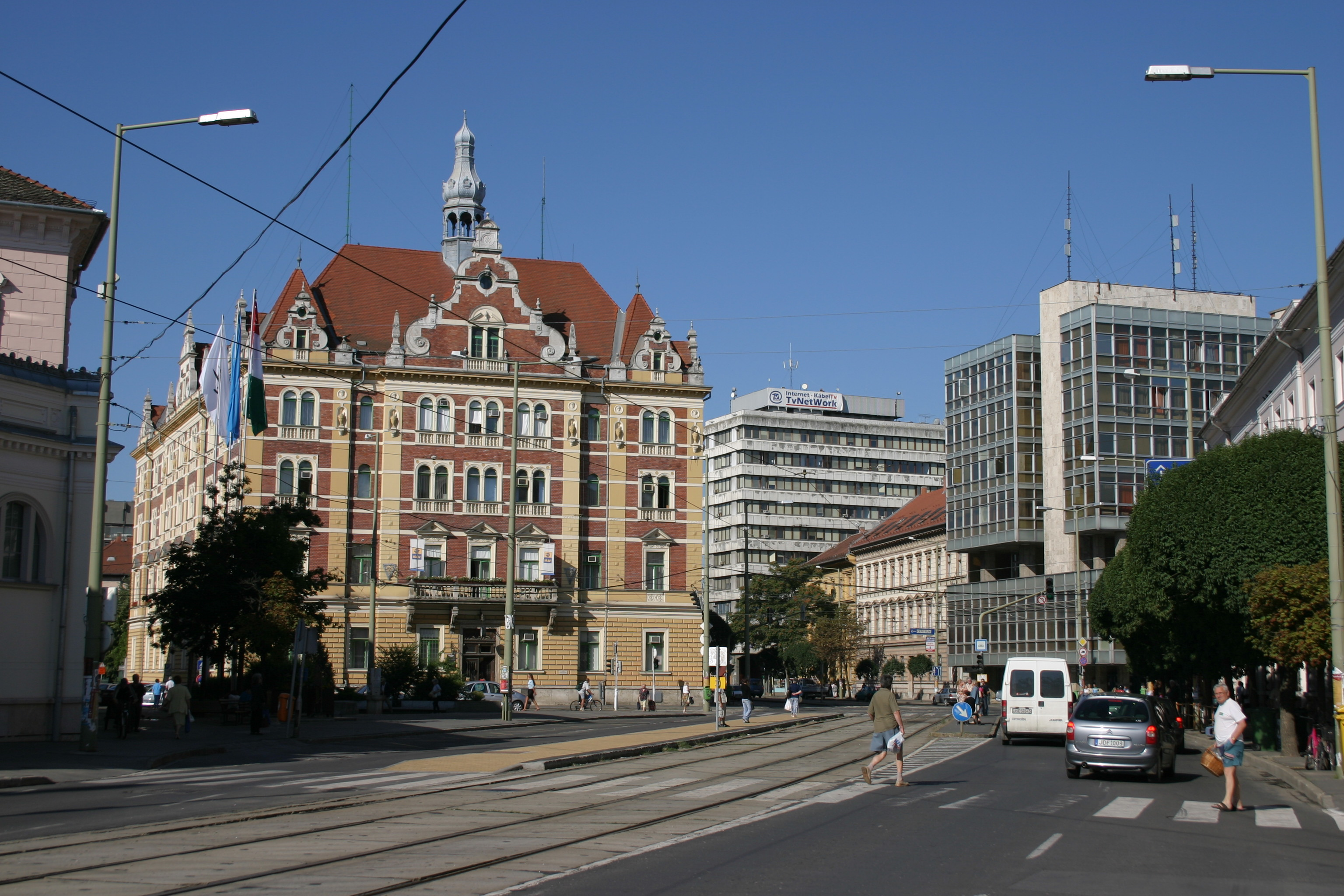
MÁV Directory Building in Szeged

- Szeged, MAV Directorship, 1894
- Budapest, Transport Museum, 1896
- Budapest, Svabhegyi Roman Catholic church, 1886
- Budapest, Stefania Palace, home to 1885 national art exhibition, then until 1945 City Museum
- Budapest, Exhibition hall
