= Satu Mare railway station =

Coordinates: 47°47′43.48″N 22°53′36.28″E

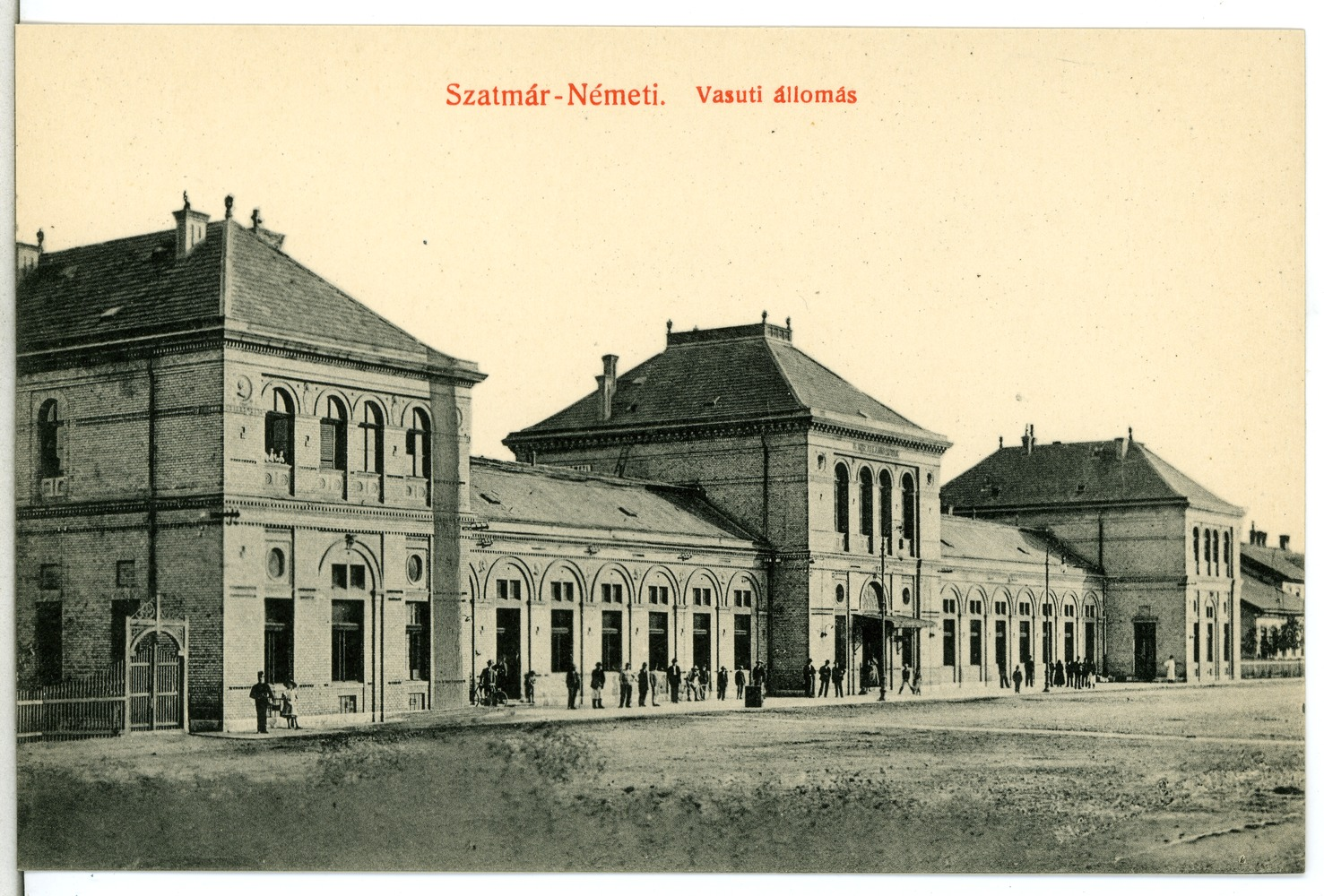
Postcard of the station in 1911.

Satu Mare railway station is the main station in Satu Mare, Romania. It is located near the city center. The station was first constructed in 1870; the current building dates from 1899 and was designed by the architect Ferenc Pfaff.

== Current situation ==
The station is situated on the Căile Ferate Române Line 400 (Brașov - Siculeni – Deda – Dej – Baia Mare – Satu Mare), on Line 402 (Oradea – Săcueni – Carei – Satu Mare – Halmeu) and on Line 417 (Satu Mare – Bixad). The Romanian Railways (CFR) provide direct rail connections to all the major Romanian cities and to Budapest. As of 2008, Satu Mare railway station serves about 54 passenger trains, including domestic trains operated by Căile Ferate Române.
