= M202 railway (Croatia) =

Railway line Zagreb–Rijeka in Croatia

Zagreb–Rijeka railway
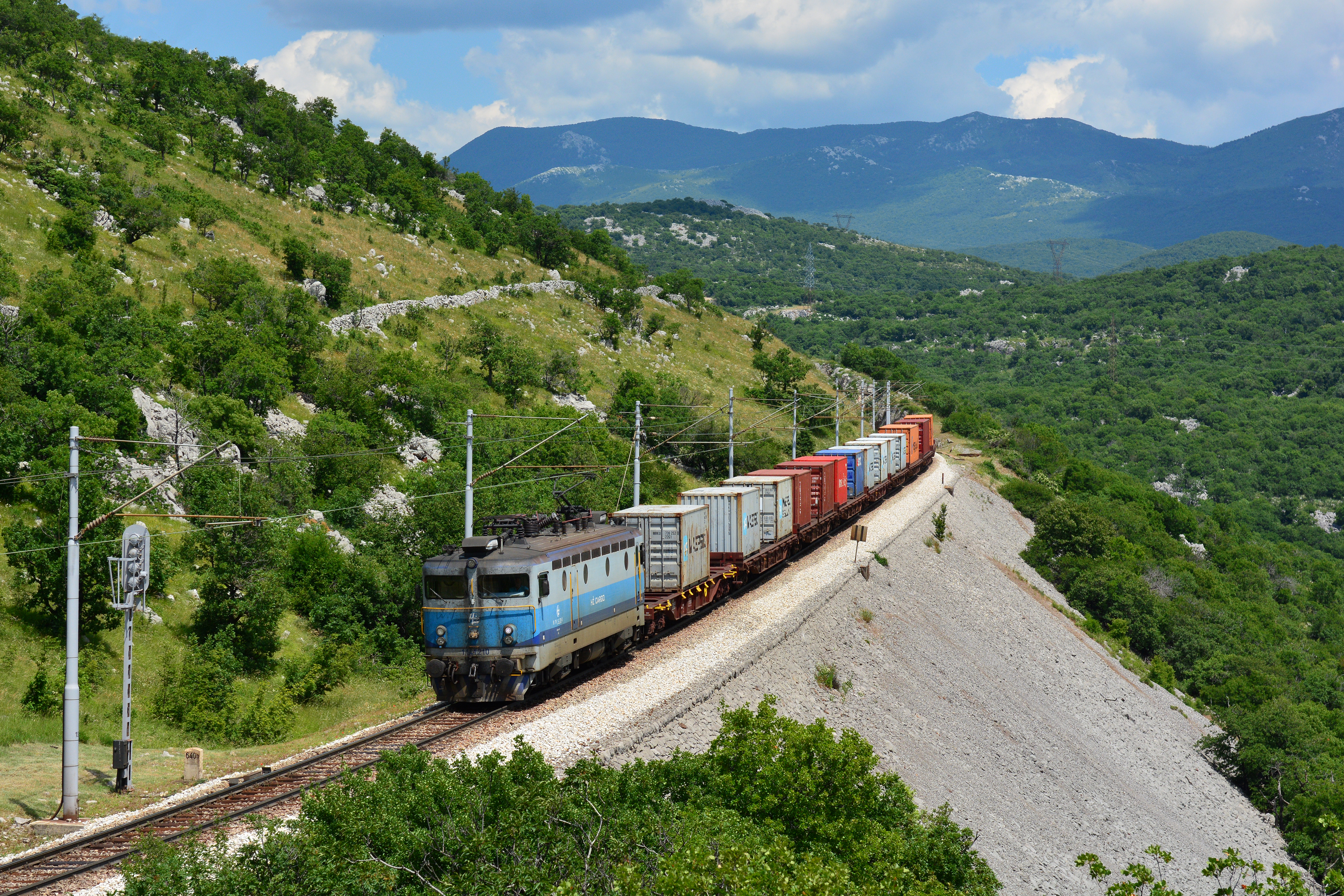

Technical
- Line length: 229 km (142.3 mi)
- Track gauge: 1,435 mm (4.7 ft)
- Electrification: 25 kV 50 Hz AC
- Operating speed: 140 km/h (87.0 mph) max.

The Zagreb–Rijeka railway, officially designated as the M202 railway, is a 229-kilometre (142 mi) long railway line in Croatia connecting Zagreb and Rijeka. It is part of the Pan-European corridor V branch B, which runs from Rijeka to Budapest. It is electrified and single-tracked.

Several short branch lines are connected to the M202 railway, including the 12,554-metre (41,188 ft) M602 railway Škrljevo–Bakar, 3,985-metre (13,074 ft) M603 railway Sušak-Pećine–Brajdica area of the Port of Rijeka, and the 1,853-metre (6,079 ft) L214 railway between Rijeka and Brajdica — all within the Rijeka city limits or its immediate surroundings.

== History ==
The line was first opened in 1865 between Zagreb and Karlovac, a branch of the Zidani most to Sisak line. The section to Rijeka was opened on 6 September 1873, and is notable for its steep descent towards the port city. Subsequently, in 1880, the line went from ownership of the Austrian Southern Railway Company to the Hungarian Government. After the First World War, the line entered ownership of the railways of the Kingdom of Serbs, Croats and Slovenes (from 1929, known as Yugoslavia). Rijeka stayed as a border station with the Ferrovie delle Stato up to 1945, when the whole line became part of the Yugoslav Railways. Since 1991, it is owned by the Croatian Railways.

=== Electrification ===
As early as 1936, the Italians electrified the Pivka-Rijeka line (not part of the current M202 railway) at the standard 3 kV DC voltage. After World War Two, the Yugoslav Railways considered the 3 kV DC electrification system to become the standard electrification system of the Yugoslav Railways, as it was already present in some parts of Croatia and Slovenia. As such, it became favoured in the 1950s and early 1960s, and electrification of the Zagreb-Rijeka line began:

- 1953: Rijeka-Fužine
- 1960: Fužine-Moravice
- 1963: Moravice-Karlovac
- 1970: Karlovac-Zagreb GK

However, in the later half of the 1960s, the Yugoslav Railways considered the 25 kV AC at 50 Hz system instead, which later became the national standard (the project was initially experimented in Bosnia and Herzegovina between 1967 and 1969). At the same time when the electrification of the Zagreb-Rijeka line was completed, the Zagreb to Belgrade line was electrified too, at 25 kV AC. Thus, Zagreb became a multisystem station, for trains heading towards Rijeka and Ljubljana.

In the first half of the 1980s, the Yugoslav Railways considered the full conversion of the remaining 3 kV DC network (by then present in all of Slovenia and parts of West Croatia) into the national standard. Work began in 1984 and the following segments were converted:

- 1985: Zagreb GK-Hrvatski Leskovac (alongside with line towards Dobova, Slovenia)
- 1987: Hrvatski Leskovac-Moravice
- 2012: Moravice-Rijeka

But by 1991, the Yugoslav Railways had run out of funds, and later on, with the dissolution of Yugoslavia, the line entered ownership of the newly-created Croatian Railways. For a long while, Moravice was a multisystem station, where former JŽ Class 362 locomotives would take over trains towards Rijeka, after being pulled by former JŽ Class 441 locomotives. Along the years, various proposals for the conversion of the network were done, including conversion of the Class 1061 locomotives to Class 1161 locomotives (these were 1061s with 25 kV AC systems, rebuilt at TŽV Janko Gredelj) but eventually, the plans didn't really materialize, as Slovenia insisted on keeping the 3 kV DC electrification, and lack of funds in early 1990s Yugoslavia and Croatia led to the 1161 project to be abandoned.

Finally, in December 2012, the rest of the line, from Moravice to Rijeka (and further onwards to the border with Slovenia) was fully converted to 25 kV AC. Now all electrified lines in Croatia use 25 kV AC electrification, although in some stations the Italian-style catenary is still visible. The last Class 1061 locomotives, along with Class 315 EMUs (a variant similar to the PKP EN57 multiple units) were withdrawn.

== Reconstruction ==
Part of the corridor between Hrvatski Leskovac and Karlovac is currently under major reconstruction. Completion of the project will permit trains to maintain a target speed of 160 km/h throughout most of the rail section.

== Gallery ==
Zagreb, Main railway station

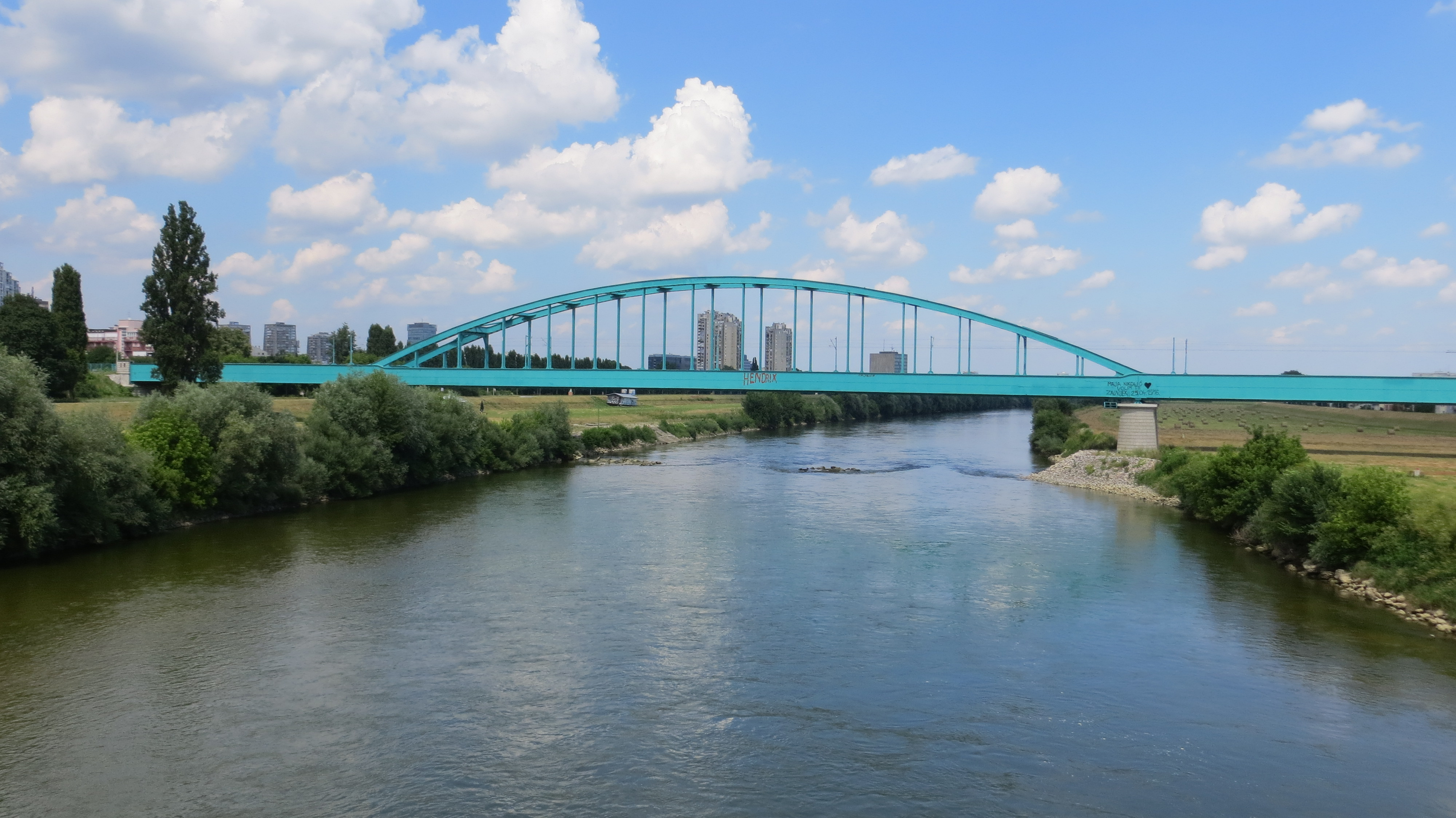
Hendrix-bridge in Zagreb, opened 1939, renovated in 1968. It got its name from Jimi Hendrix in 1970, due to a famous graffiti, noticeable on its green paint

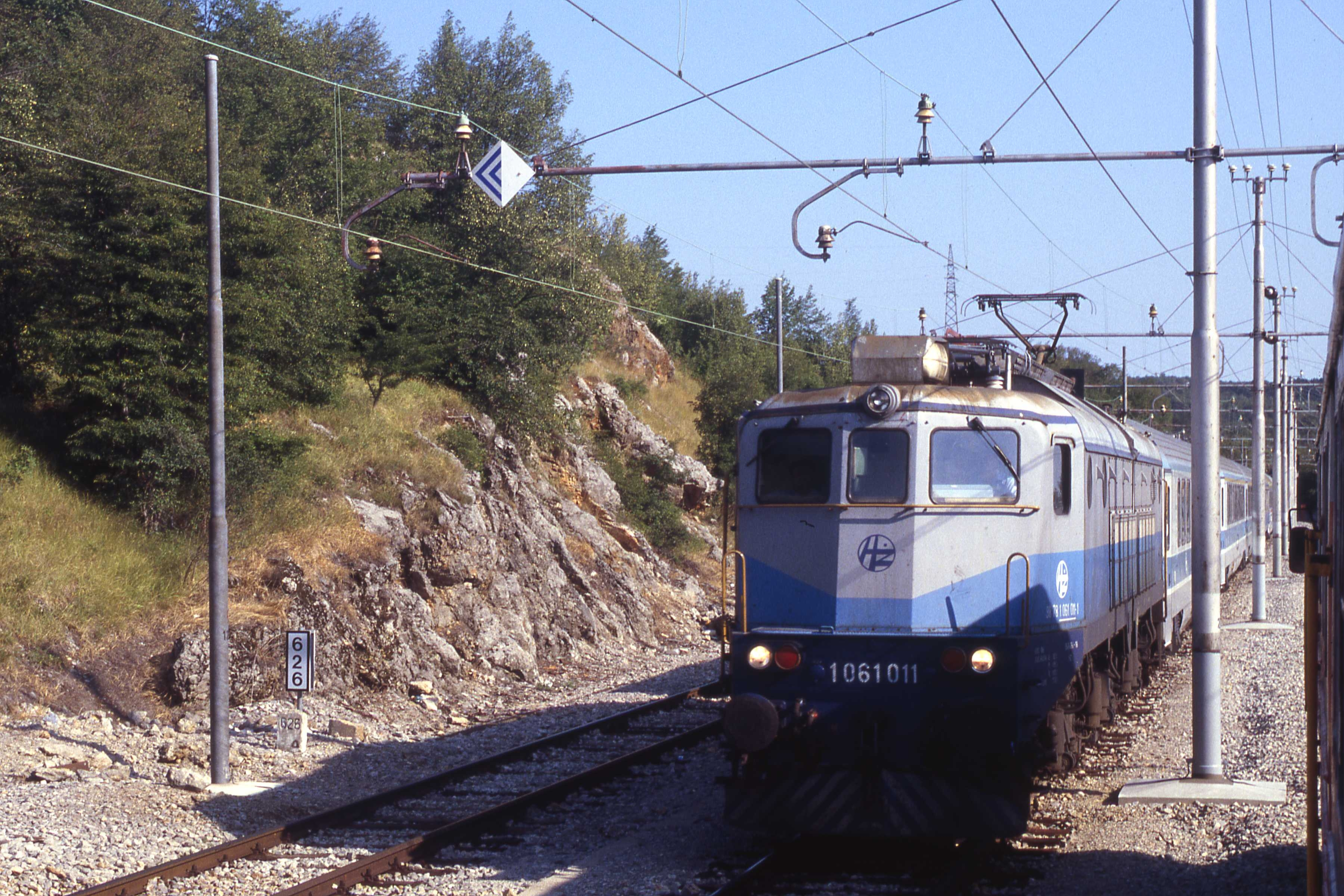
Retired class 1061 locomotive pulling an InterCity from Zagreb, 2004

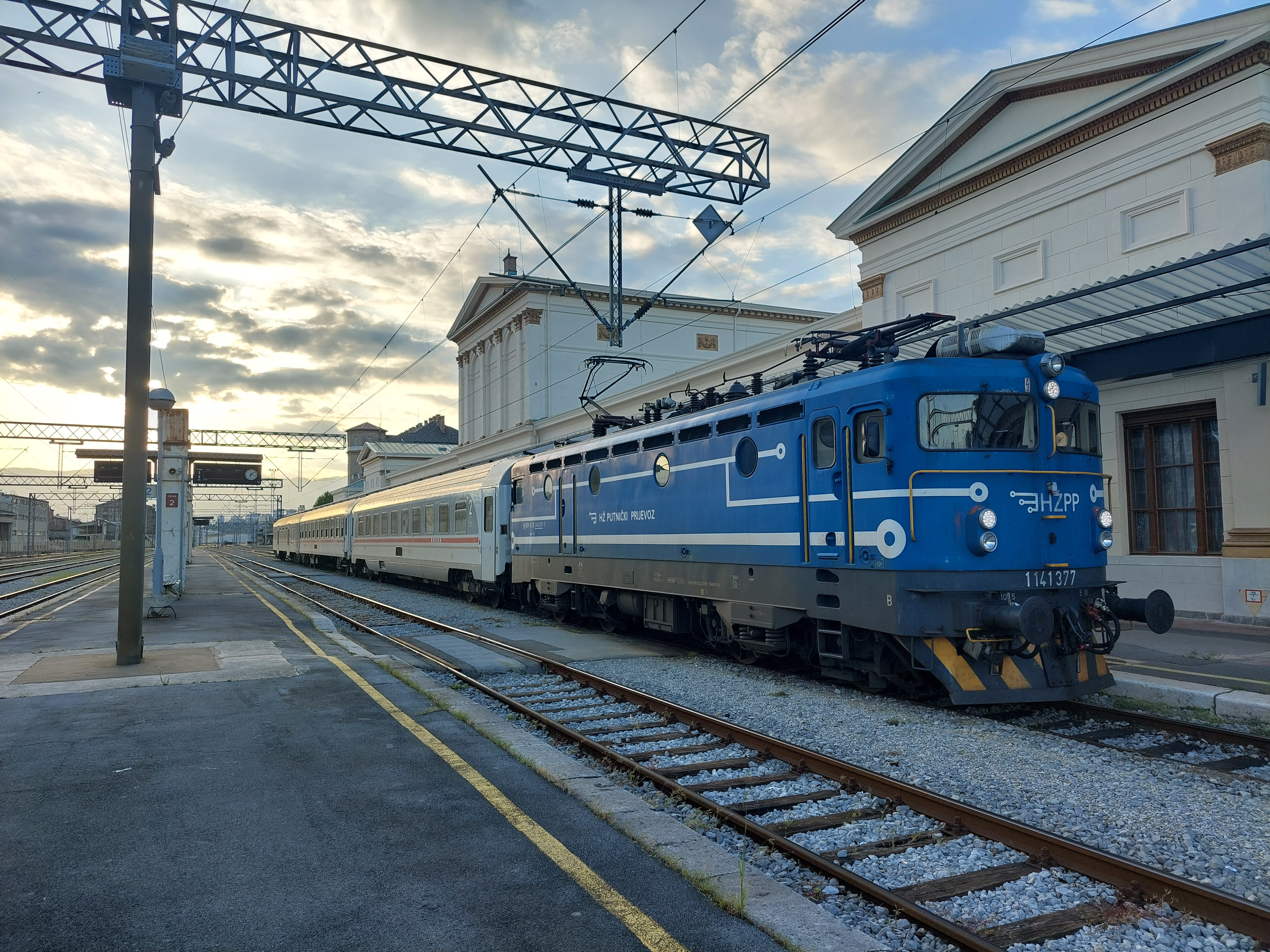
Rijeka railway station
