= Istvan Javorek =

United States sports conditioning coach (born 1943)

István Javorek
- Born: January 6, 1943 (age 83); Székelyhíd, Hungary, today Săcueni, Romania

István Javorek (born January 6, 1943, in eastern Europe) is a United States sports conditioning coach. Coach Javorek is the retired head strength and conditioning coach at Johnson County Community College, Kansas, United States. He supervised the strength and conditioning program for JCCC’s 18 sports and serves as a professor emeritus of fitness in the physical education department. He has been married to Julia Javorek since 1968, and they have one child, Dr. Henriette A. Javorek. He now lives in Overland Park, Kansas. He is the new strength and conditioning coach at Overland Park racquet club.

== Early coaching career ==
In 1964, Javorek graduated from college and by 1968 was a coach at the Clujana Athletic Club in Cluj, Romania. Two of his more famous athletes were Dragomir Cioroslan (bronze medalist in Weightlifting at the 1984 Olympics) and Istvan Tasnadi (silver medalist in weightlifting at the 1984 Olympics). It was also during this time that Javorek passed the first class coaching board examination (the highest coaching level in Romania). He presented to the coaching board his revolutionary creation, the Javorek Complex #1 and Javorek Complex #2 (performed with dumbbells or barbells). Javorek felt that the main purpose of these exercises was to figure out an easier way to do an exercise complex, which could then change the monotony of a workout, and he hoped at the same time have a greater influence on the neuro-muscular and osteo-muscular system.

== 1980s ==
In 1982, Javorek defected to the United States and in 1984 became an all-sports strength and conditioning assistant coach at Texas A&M University. He was the Weightlifting coach of Texas A&M Weightlifting Club, but his duties were soon extended to coaching the field events and conditioning for men's and women's Track, Tennis, Basketball, Swimming, volleyball, and assistant for football.

At A&M, Javorek designed the whole conditioning program for the 1986 world fastest 200m sprinter, Floyd Heard; former 10,000m world record holder, Arturo Barrios; javelin thrower Juan de la Garza; Canadian long jump record holder, Ian James; Mexican record triple jumper, Francisco Olivares and several other top athletes. In particular, Randy Barnes, the silver medalist in the shot put at the 1988 Olympics and gold medalist in the shot put at the 1996 Olympics. In 1987, Javorek became head strength and conditioning coach at Johnson County Community College.

== 1990s ==
In December 1992, Romania awarded him with its highest coaching honor, the Emeritus Coaching Award. Many of the athletes he worked with have moved on to play professional sports, including Kit Pellow (baseball) and Kareem Rush and Wayne Simien (basketball). Sumya Anani, world champion female boxer, has been coached by Javorek for years. In Javorek’s 20-year career at JCCC, he has been a part of five national championships, 78 Region VI titles, 119 East Jayhawk Conference championships and 63 teams have finished in the top five in national championship play.

== 2000 and beyond ==
On March 23, 2002, Javorek was inducted into the Missouri Valley Weightlifting Hall of Fame, and on June 2, 2003, he earned induction into the USA Strength and Conditioning Hall of Fame

He retired in 2011 and is now Professor Emeritus at Johnson County Community College.

== Education ==
Pedagogical Institute Of Physical Education And Sport, Cluj, Romania 1960 - 1964

Course of Study: Physical Education and Sport, Massage, and Basic Physical Therapy.

Degree: Diploma in Physical Education, certified as teacher and coach.

Fully qualified to teach the following: gymnastics, soccer, team handball, volleyball, basketball, track and field, weightlifting, Alpine and Nordic skiing and swimming.

Specialized in massage therapy, physical therapy, and in sport psychology, especially experience in the Schultz Autogenic Training Method (self-hypnosis) and in sport nutrition, emphasizing the use of natural herbs to aid the body in recovery and promotion of strength.

Part-Time continuing education and professional development. Specialized in weightlifting, strength & conditioning and track and field. Graduated in 1968 as a Third Class weightlifting and conditioning coach.

Graduated in 1971 as a Second Class weightlifting and conditioning coach.

Graduated in 1974 as a First Class weightlifting and conditioning coach, the highest coaching qualification in Romania

== Additional professional experiences ==
Invited by South Korean Olympic Committee to train the national weightlifting team and instruct coaches Seoul, Korea October, 1983 - December 1983

United States Olympic Committee, International Exchange Program, Lima, Peru. June, 1984. He instructed national team and 24 coaches in state-of-the-art techniques for Olympic-style weightlifting and conditioning

World Junior Weightlifting Championship, Assistant coach, Fort Lauderdale, FL May 1989

USA Olympic Festival, Raleigh-Durham, North Carolina, July, 1987 Head Coach for the West Team.

USA Olympic Festival, Houston, TX July, 1986, Weightlifting coach for the South Team

== Publications ==
“The Whoop Ass Workout” Javorek’s Bodybuilders Conditioning Muscle & Fitness December 2005 Pages 134 - 142

“Pre-season Conditioning for Volleyball: Uphill, Stairs and Sand Stairs or Shredded Rubber Boxes Training Programs” Performance Volleyball Conditioning Volume 11, Number 2 pages 3–4 Performance Volleyball Conditioning Volume 10, number 5 January 2004, page numbers 6-9

“Hill Work” Athletic Management June/July 2003, page number 58

“King of the Hill” T&C, Training & Conditioning, May/June 2003, page numbers 85 - 90

“Power Thrash II” Muscle & Fitness, May 2002, page numbers 166-221

“Power Thrash” Muscle & Fitness, August 2000, page numbers 174-187

“Big Fun” Muscle & Fitness, March 1999, page numbers 90-98 Adding Variety- A Menu of Pre-season Conditioning-” Performance Volleyball Conditioning Newsletter, Volume 6, Number 2, 1998, page numbers 6-7,10

“The Benefits of Combination Lifts” Strength And Conditioning Journal, Volume 20, Number 3, June 1998, page numbers 53-56

“Dumbbell Power” Muscle & Fitness, November 1998, pages 104-110 – contributor to Timothy C. Fritz article

“Triple Threat” by Jeff O’Connell Muscle & Fitness January 1998 pages 90– 97; an article interviewing conditioning coaches about Javorek’s Complex Exercises

“A Dumbbell Program for Post-game recovery and Strength Maintenance” Performance Conditioning For Soccer Volume 1 Number 1 page number 3, 1996

“Favorite Volleyball Specific Exercises from the Experts: Medicine Ball Squat Jump Setting” Performance Volleyball Conditioning Newsletter, Volume 1, Number 9, page number 8

“Favorite Volleyball Specific Exercises from the Experts: Medicine Ball Three Steps and Spike Imitation” Performance Volleyball Conditioning Newsletter, Volume 2, Number 1, page number 8

“Preparatory Circuit for Cycling” part 2 Performance Conditioning For Cycling Volume 3 Number 6 page numbers 1-2 8-9

“Hill Running and Jump Training” Cross Training Ideas Performance Conditioning For Cycling Volume 3 Number 4 page number 7

“Preseason Preparation for basketball” Coaching Women’s Basketball, Special Issue 1996/29 Volume.... page number....

“Combination of horizontal and vertical transfer reaction”(College Coaches’ Corner) Strength And Conditioning Journal (NSCA) Volume 19, number 4, August 1996, page number 57

“Yearly Plan of Preparation for Basketball and Volleyball Conditioning” Strength And Conditioning Journal (NSCA) Volume 17 Number 3 June 1995 page numbers 68-72

“Specificity in sports conditioning” National Strength And Conditioning (NSCA) Journal, Volume 15, Number 6, November–December 1993, page numbers 31-33 Coaching Volleyball Journal, February–March, 1993, page numbers 26-27.

“Equipment Design: Sand boxes (sand stairs) and their use in developing explosive response” National Strength And Conditioning Association (NSCA) Journal, Volume 13, Number 5, 1991, page numbers 84-87

“Year-Round Conditioning: The summer Conditioning Program.” National Strength And Conditioning Association (NSCA) Journal, Volume 14, Number 1, 1992, page numbers 26-29

“Year-Round Conditioning: The Fall Preparation Phase.” National Strength And Conditioning Association (NSCA) Journal, Volume 14, Number 2, 1992, page numbers 22-24, continued in Volume 14, Number 3, 1992, page numbers 32-38.

"Roundtable: Restoration Part II." National Strength And Conditioning Association (NSCA) Journal, December 1990 January 1991, page numbers 10-20.

"Roundtable: Restoration Part I." National Strength And Conditioning Association (NSCA) Journal, October - November 1990, page numbers 20 - 29.

"Weight-room in the hallway" National Strength And Conditioning Association (NSCA) Journal, October - November 1990, page numbers 45 - 46.

"Six Week Training Program" National Strength And Conditioning Association (NSCA) Journal, August- September 1990, page numbers 62 - 68.

"Dumbbell Power Clean" National Strength And Conditioning Association (NSCA) Journal, February - March 1990, page numbers 17 - 19.

"Steroid-free physical preparation in athletic development" National Strength And Conditioning Association (NSCA) Journal, December 1989-January 1990, page numbers 34 - 37.

"Plyometrics" National Strength And Conditioning Association Journal, April - May 1989, page numbers 52 - 57

"Weight-room Grid" National Strength And Conditioning Association (NSCA) Journal, December 1988, January 1989, page numbers 41 - 42.

"General Conditioning with Complex I and II" National Strength And Conditioning Association (NSCA) Journal, February- March 1988, page numbers 34 - 42.

"Shrugs" National Strength And Conditioning Association Journal, December 1987 - January 1988, page numbers 28 - 33. Counterpoint”- Reply-National Strength And Conditioning Association Journal, April 1987 Volume 9 Number 2 page numbers 69-70,75

"Methods to Enhance Recovery and Avoid Over-training" National Strength And Conditioning Association Journal, June–July 1987, page numbers 43 - 47.

"Modeling Circle" National Strength And Conditioning Association Journal, August - September 1986, page numbers 32 - 35.

"Teaching of technique in the snatch and clean and jerk" National Strength And Conditioning Association (NSCA) Journal, June -July 1986, page numbers 45 - 51.

"Round Table: Power Clean" National Strength And Conditioning Association ( NSCA ) Journal, December 1984 - January 1985, page numbers 10 - 25.

"Guidelines for prepubescent and adolescent athletes in strength conditioning training", presented at the National Strength And Conditioning Association ( NSCA) Convention, Dallas, TX. 1985. Published in United States Weightlifting Federation (U.S.W.F) Weightlifting Manual 1985.

"Technique Teaching Methods" United States Weightlifting Federation (U.S.W.F) Coaching Manual 1985.

"Weightlifting Manual" United States Weightlifting Federation, 1986, 1987, 1988 contributor.
