= Săcueni =

Săcueni Székelyhíd
- Town
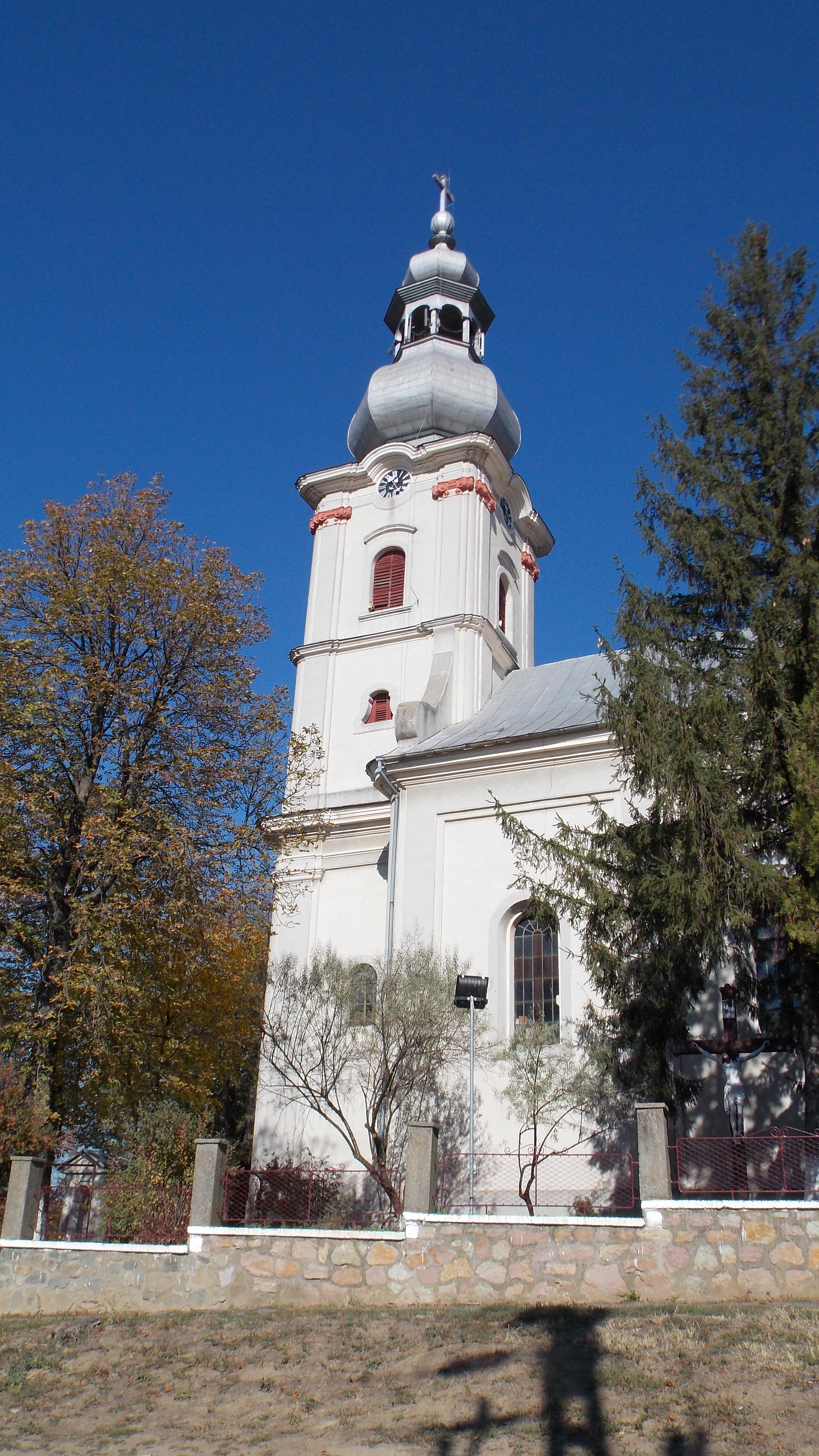
- Roman Catholic church in Săcueni

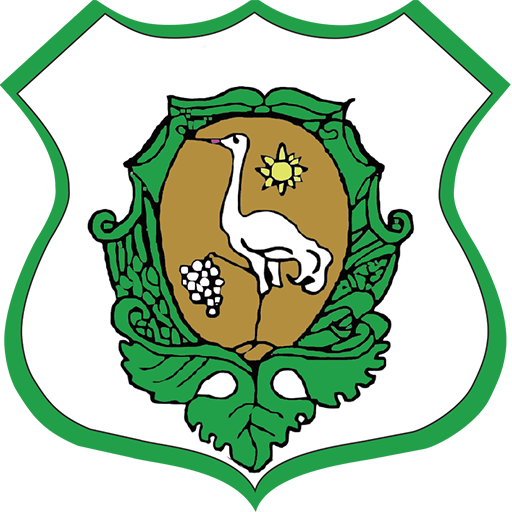
- Coat of arms

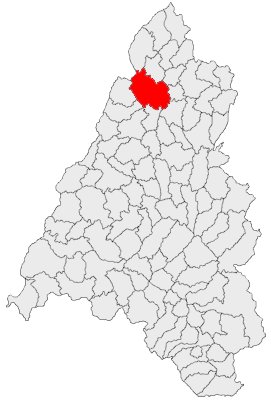
- Location within Bihor County

- Location in Romania
- Coordinates: 47.3525°N 22.0914°E
- Country: Romania
- County: Bihor

Government
  - Mayor (2024–2028): Csaba Béres (UDMR)
- Area: 151.40 km^{2} (58.46 sq mi)
- Elevation: 130 m (430 ft)
- Population (2021-12-01): 10,720
  - Density: 70.81/km^{2} (183.4/sq mi)
- Time zone: UTC+02:00 (EET)
  - Summer (DST): UTC+03:00 (EEST)
- Postal code: 417435
- Area code: (+40) 02 59
- Vehicle reg.: BH
- Website: www.sacueni.ro

Săcueni (Romanian pronunciation: [səkuˈjenʲ]; Hungarian: Székelyhíd; German: Zickelhid; Yiddish: סעקלהיד Seklhid; Turkish: Sengevi), often spelled Săcuieni, is a town in Bihor County, Crișana, Romania. It administers five villages: Cadea (Kágya), Ciocaia (Csokaly), Cubulcut (Érköbölkút), Olosig (Érolaszi), and Sânnicolau de Munte (Hegyközszentmiklós).

== Geography ==
Săcueni lies in the Western Plain, which comprises the Romanian reaches of the Great Hungarian Plain. It is located around 42 km (26 mi) north-east of the county seat, Oradea, in the proximity of the Hungarian border.

The town is crossed by national road DN19 (part of European route E671), which runs from Oradea to Satu Mare and Sighetu Marmației. The 10 km (6.2 mi) long road DN19D branches off in the center of the town and leads to the nearby border crossing, from which another road continues to Létavértes in Hungary.

The Săcueni railway station serves the CFR Line 402, which connects Oradea to Carei, Satu Mare, and Halmeu.

== History ==
The first written record of the town's name dates back to 1217. Then its name arose in 1278 as Zekulhyd and in 1325 as Zekulhyda whose meaning is bridge of Székely in Hungarian, and according to a legend, Székelys were settled down here to guard the bridge of Ér as early as the 10th century.

In 1417, Hungarian king Sigismund gave Székelyhíd the right of organizing a fair. Soon afterwards, it also got the right that the fair to be weekly scheduled. In 1514, it was occupied by György Dózsa's army and then in 1661, it was also occupied by the Ottoman army. As a condition of the peace treaty of Vasvár, the town's castle was destroyed in 1665. From 1691 it was part of the Habsburg monarchy up until the Austro-Hungarian Compromise of 1867. Thereafter it became part of the Kingdom of Hungary within Austria-Hungary.

After the collapse of Austria-Hungary at the end of World War I, and the declaration of the Union of Transylvania with Romania, the Romanian Army took control of the town in the spring of 1919, during the Hungarian–Romanian War. Săcueni officially became part of the territory ceded to the Kingdom of Romania in June 1920 under the terms of the Treaty of Trianon. After the administrative unification law in 1925, the town became the seat of plasa Săcueni (comprising 11 villages) in Bihor County. In August 1940, under the auspices of Nazi Germany, which imposed the Second Vienna Award, Hungary retook the territory of Northern Transylvania (which included Săcueni) from Romania. A border incident occurred at the nearby village of Diosig on 4 September 1940. Towards the end of World War II, however, the town was taken back from Hungarian and German troops by Romanian and Soviet forces in October 1944, during the initial stages of the Battle of Debrecen; it became again part of Romania in March 1945. Following the administrative reform of 1950, the locality became part of Săcueni Raion within Bihor Region (renamed Oradea Region in 1952 and Crișana Region in 1960). In 1968, the old territorial division into județe was reinstituted, and Săcueni became part of Bihor County.

== Population ==
Historical population
Year	Pop.	±%
1880	8,706	—
1890	9,716	+11.6%
1900	10,630	+9.4%
1910	11,626	+9.4%
1920	11,467	−1.4%
1930	11,628	+1.4%
1941	11,704	+0.7%
1956	13,100	+11.9%
1966	13,490	+3.0%
1977	13,540	+0.4%
1992	11,951	−11.7%
2002	11,665	−2.4%
2011	11,526	−1.2%
2021	10,720	−7.0%
Source: Census data

According to the 2021 census, Săcueni has a population of 10,720. At the census from 2011, there were 11,113 people living within the town; of those, 77.49% were ethnic Hungarians, 15.7% were ethnic Romani, 6.62% Romanians, and 0.17% others.

== Natives ==
- Istvan Javorek (born 1943), United States sports conditioning coach
- Gábor Mihály (born 1942), Hungarian sculptor
- Mihály Z. Tompa (born 1949), Romanian and Hungarian writer

== Historical monuments ==
- Stubenberg Castle, built in the late 18th century and completed by the beginning of the 19th century.
