= M203 railway (Croatia) =

Rijeka–Šapjane railway
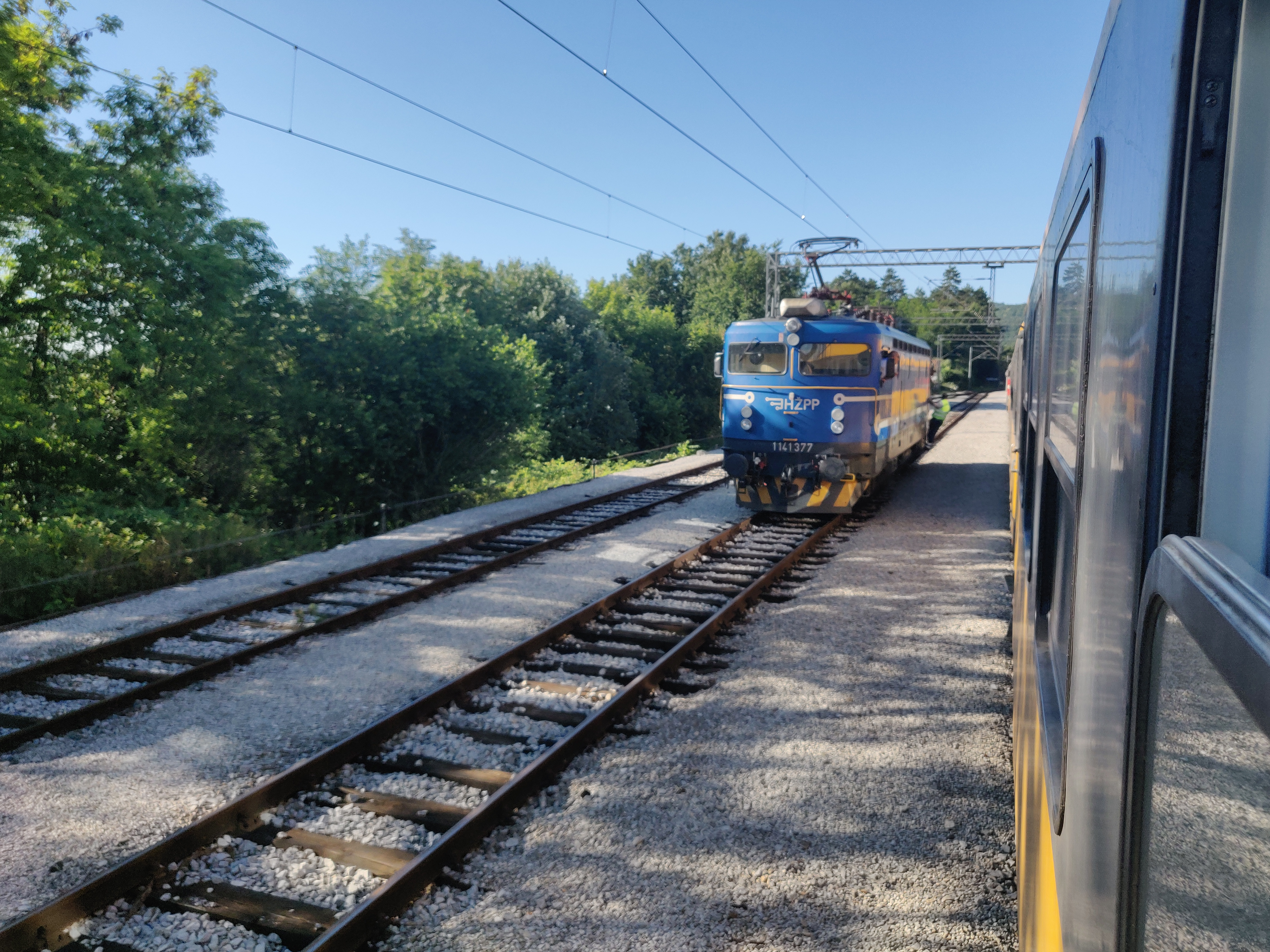
- M203 railway

Overview
- Line number: M203 (HŽ)

Technical
- Line length: 30.9 km (19.2 mi)
- Track gauge: 1435 mm
- Electrification: 25 kV 50 Hz AC
- Operating speed: 50 km/h (31 mph) max.

The Rijeka–Šapjane−State border railway, officially designated the M203 railway is a 30.9-kilometre (19.2 mi) long, single-tracked railway line in Croatia, which is operated by HŽ Infrastruktura. M203 connects Rijeka to the Slovene railway network north of Šapjane and to the Zagreb via M202 east of Rijeka. It is electrified with 25 kV AC from Rijeka to Šapjane and 3 kV DC from Šapjane to the national border. Until 2014, it was classified as M502.

== History ==
The route was opened in 1873.

== Gallery ==
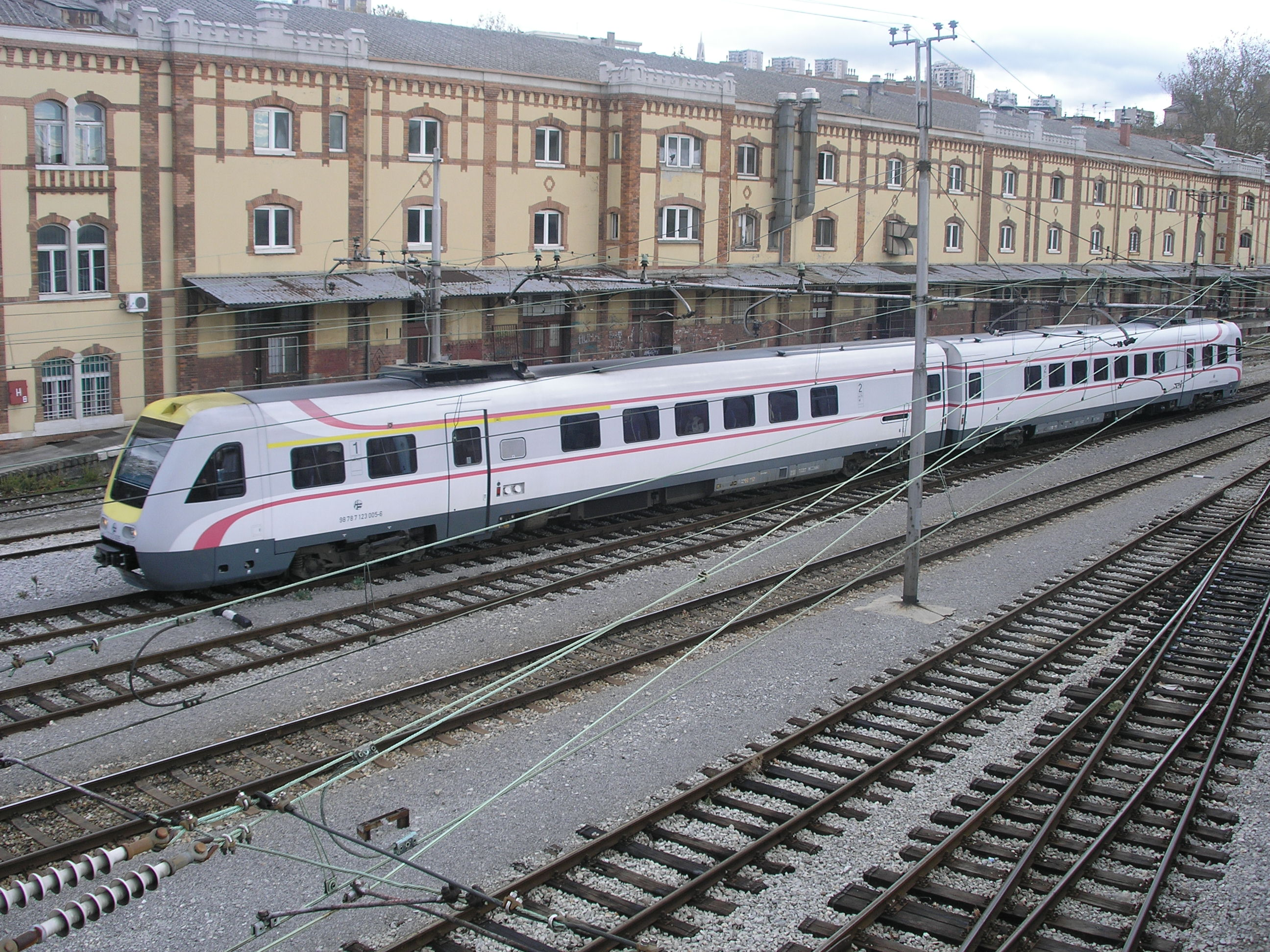
Rijeka station

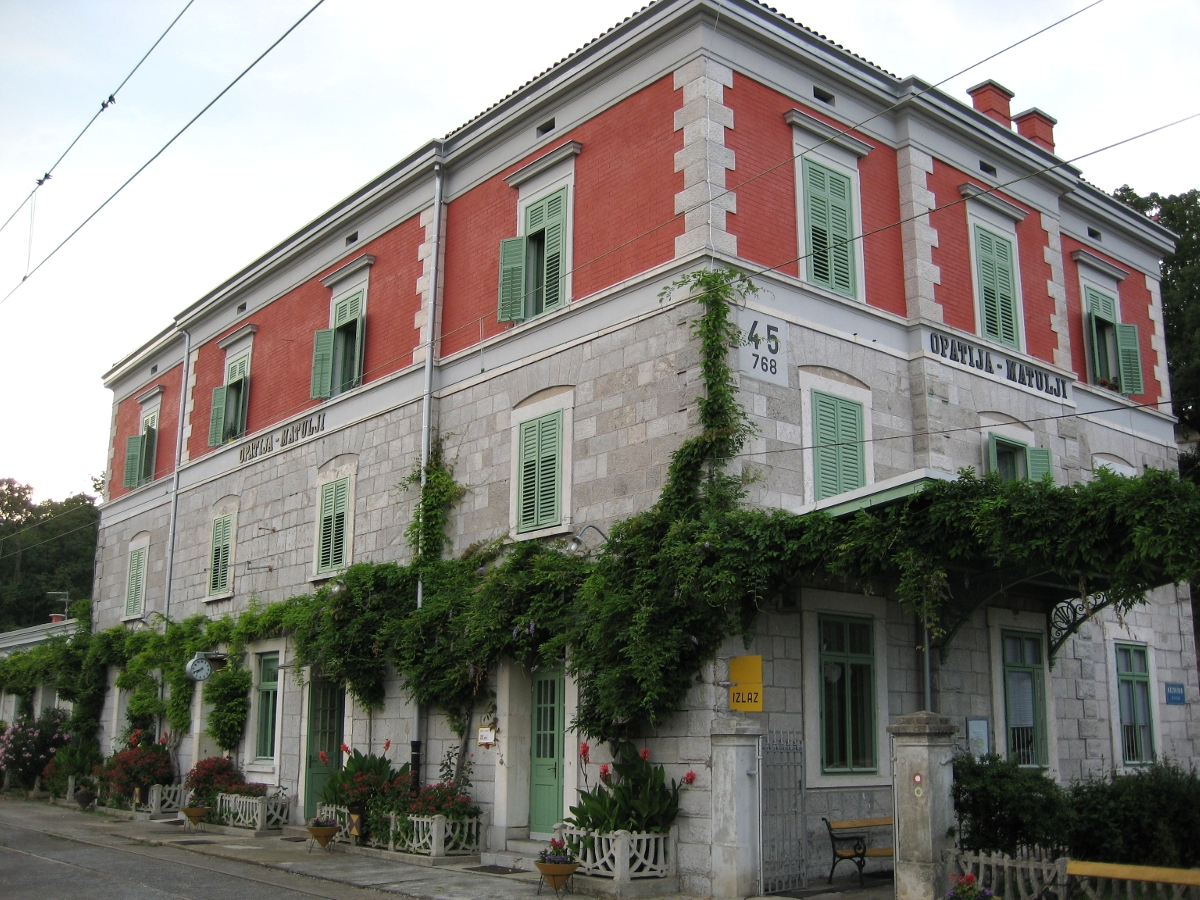
Opatija−Matulji station

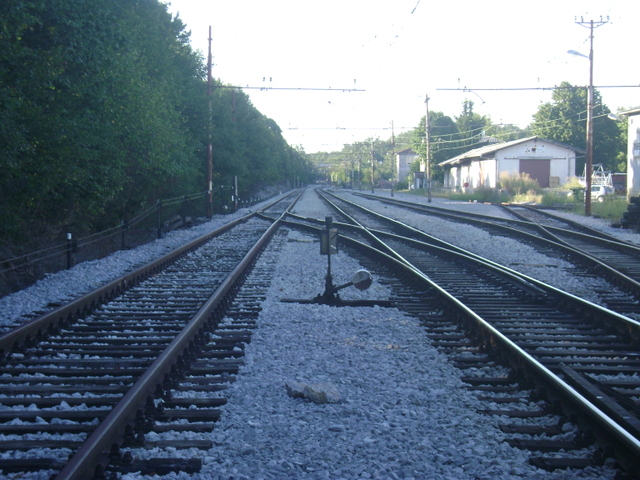
Jurdani station
