= Skirmish at Diosig =

Skirmish of Diosig
- Part of World War II
- Skirmish at Diosig (Romania)
Date	4 September 1940
Location	Diosig, Bihor County, Kingdom of Romania
Result	Dispute

Belligerents
Kingdom of Romania	(Kingdom of Hungary (1920–1946)) Kingdom of Hungary

Commanders and leaders
(Kingdom of Romania) Lt. Dumitru Lazea †	(Kingdom of Hungary (1920–1946)) Corporal Juhász

Casualties and losses
6 killed	9 killed

The Skirmish at Diosig was a border incident between troops of the Kingdom of Romania and the Kingdom of Hungary in September 1940.

== Background ==
The Second Vienna Award was signed on 30 August 1940, allowing Hungary to occupy and annex Northern Transylvania. The Royal Hungarian Army was scheduled to take over the region between 5 and 13 September.

On 4 September 1940, in violation of the Second Vienna Award, some Hungarian troops entered the border village of Diosig a day before the movement of Hungarian troops into Transylvania had been scheduled to begin. Approximately ten men from the Hungarian Army participated in the funeral of Lajos Szűcs, who had been killed a few days earlier, in a crowd of local Hungarian people celebrating the result of the award, despite the right of assembly being prohibited.

After the funeral, they did not return to Hungary but entered the village at the invitation of local Hungarians. Romanian troops, led by Lieutenant Dumitru Lazea, became aware that the Hungarians had entered the village before the date permitted by the award and challenged István Asók, the commander of the local militia. Meanwhile, someone informed the retreating Hungarian troops to return.

The Romanian troops took a defensive position at the gates and trenches approximately 600 m from the Hungarians, who still pushed forward. When the Romanians fired a warning shot, the Hungarian troops opened fire.

The Romanians returned fire and stormed the Hungarian troops. The Romanian lieutenant was wounded, and some of his soldiers died. The rest of his troops broke away. The Hungarian troops secured the area and went to Lazea's aid. Dezső Lengyel, the local doctor of the village, was trusted to take care of the wounded. Because Lazea could not be treated properly in Diosig, it was decided to take him to Nagyléta, Hungary, near the border.

It was considered impossible for Hungarian troops who had entered Romanian territory illegally to take Lazea to Oradea, the nearest town in Romania. Lazea was put in a cart, and the local butcher of Jewish origin, Izidor Rosenfeld, took him to Nagyléta. Villagers' rumours were that he had volunteered out of revenge because he had been robbed earlier by Lazea's men, whom the laws allowed to take belongings of local people.

Rosenfeld deliberately drove over potholes. Lazea was profoundly shaken, his head continuously. He arrived in a worse condition and was immediately redirected to the military hospital of Debrecen, where he died on 5 September.

The exact cause of death and the medical report are not known. He was buried on the same day after a military funeral.

Nine Hungarians and six Romanians (including Lazea) were killed in the incident.

== Aftermath ==
Local Romanians informed a colonel of the nearby retreating Romanian troops at Săcueni. He was the uncle of Lazea and was so enraged by the events that he ordered the village to provide the remains immediately, or the people of Diosig would perish. He also captured ten local people and threatened to kill them if his demands were not fulfilled. Many local people fled to Nagyléta. As had been initially scheduled, the Hungarian takeover of the region commenced on 5 September and ended on the 13th. On 6 September, Sándor Bodnár secured the village and sent deputies to the superior of Lazea, where they discussed the events.

The colonel's information was that a full company had attacked the Romanian troops and massacred Romanian inhabitants of the village. After he was told what had really happened, he released the captured Hungarians. The case was discussed between Hungarian and Romanian diplomatic committees as well.

On September 15, the remains of Lazea were delivered and turned in to the Romanian Army. His reburial was held on October 5 in the village where he was born. The Hungarian authorities promised a rigorous investigation into the case, but it is still unknown if Juhász was punished.

== Legacy ==
To honour Lieutenant Dumitru Lazea, a street bears his name in the city of Câmpulung, Argeș County.
