= Stubenberg Castle =

Stubenberg Castle Castelul Stubenberg
- Săcueni; Romania
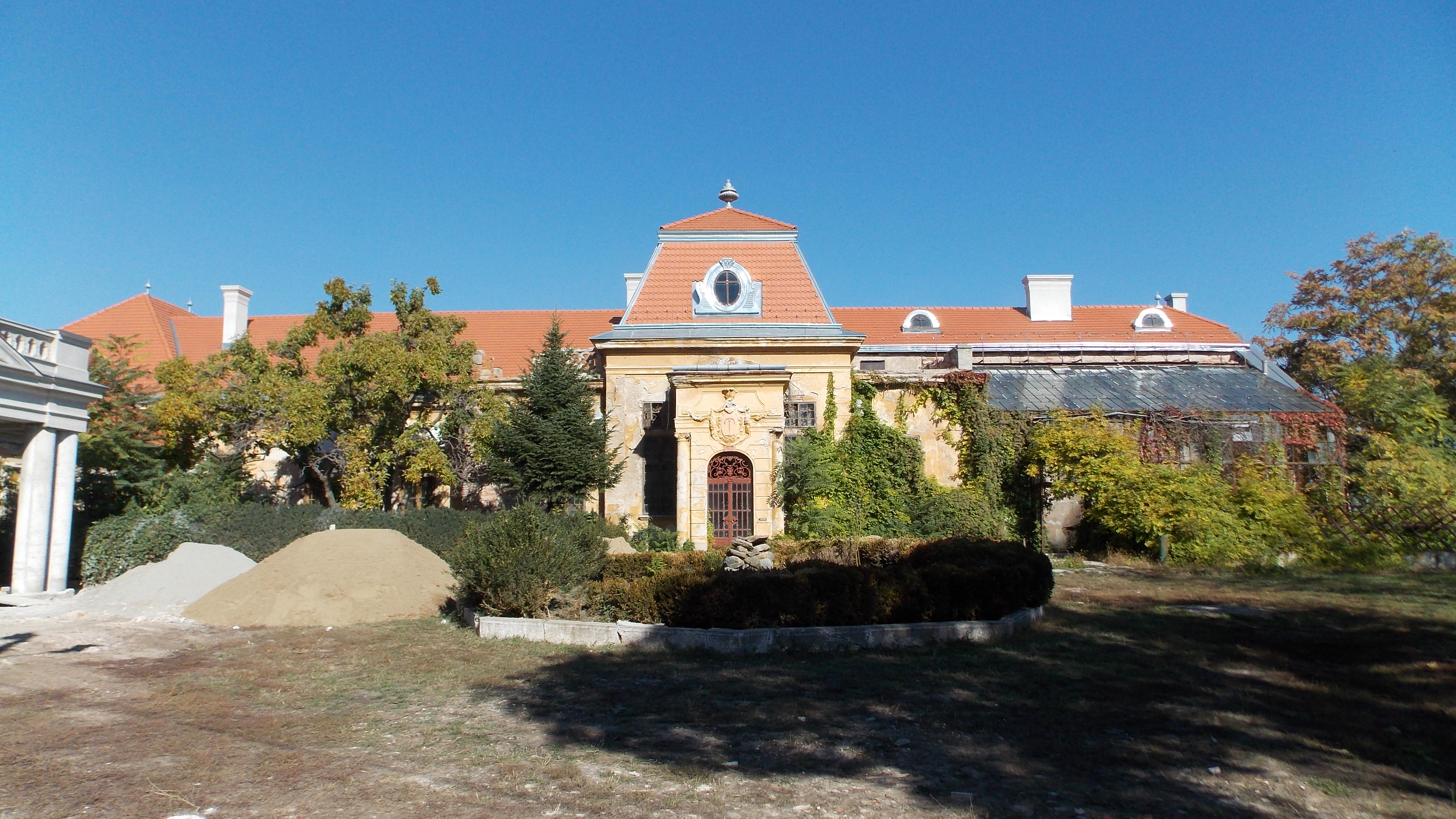
- Front view of the castle and its garden

Site information
- Type: Castle
- Owner: Romanian State
- Condition: Currently being renovated

The Stubenberg Castle is a historical monument in Săcueni, Bihor, Romania. Construction of the castle began in the late 18th century and was finalized by the beginning of the 19th century.

== History ==
The castle originally belonged to the House of Habsburg, who offered it to Count Johann Franz Gottfried von Dietrichstein-Weichselstädt, counselor to Maria Theresa. In 1830 it was sold to the Stubenberg family.

Presently it belongs to the Romanian State. It used to function as the "Petõfi Sándor" Highschool until 2008.

== See also ==
- List of castles in Romania
- Tourism in Romania
- Săcueni
