= Diosig =

Diosig Bihardiószeg
- Commune
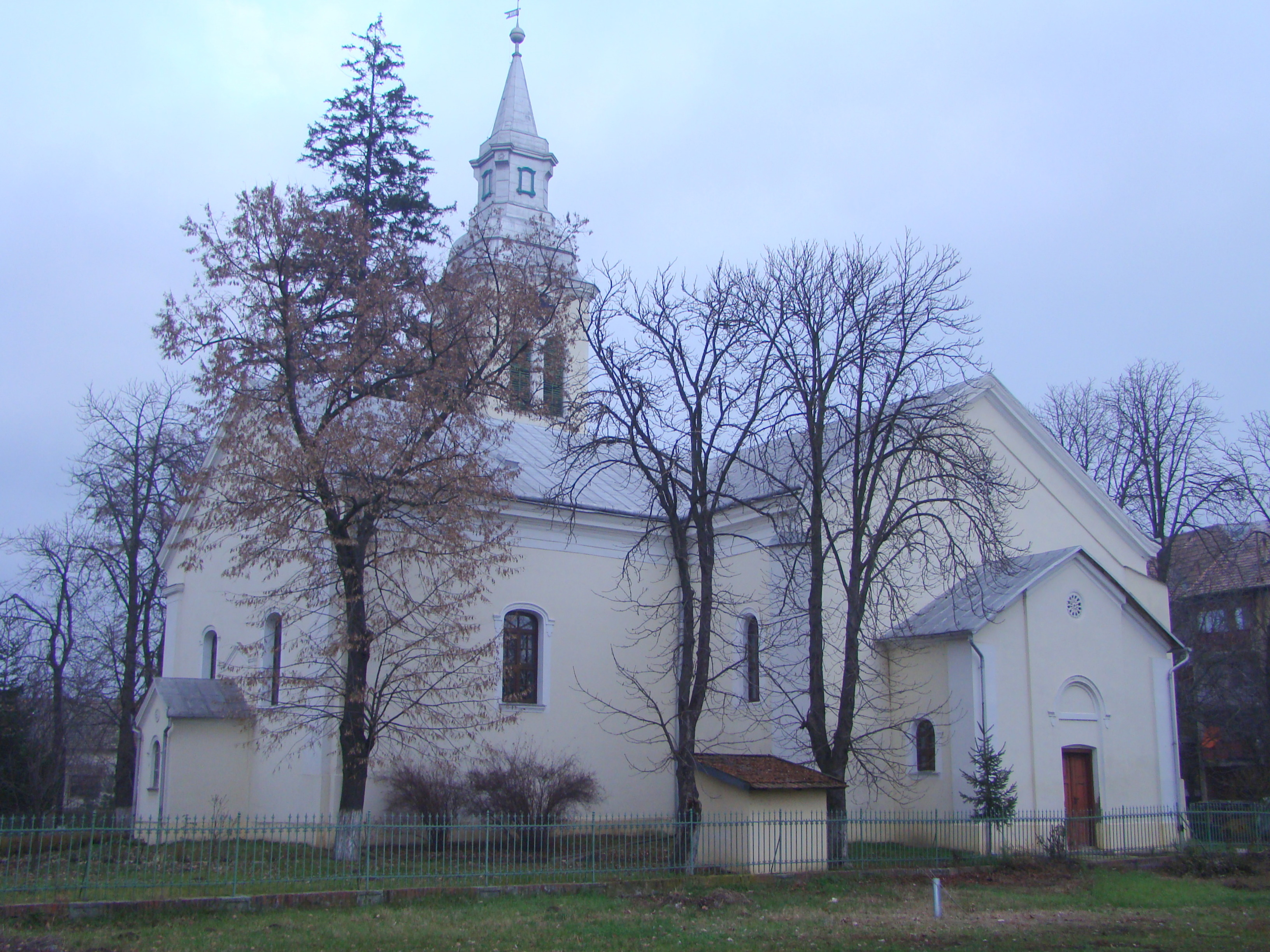
- Reformed church in Diosig

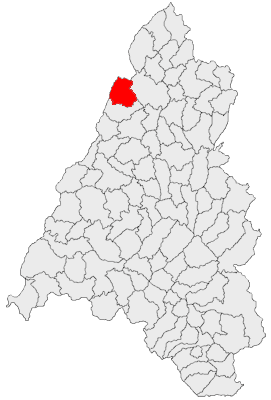
- Location in Bihor County

- Location in Romania
- Coordinates: 47°18′N 22°0′E
- Country: Romania
- County: Bihor

Government
  - Mayor (2020–2024): Attila-Ferencz Mados (UDMR)
- Area: 93.14 km^{2} (35.96 sq mi)
- Population (2021-12-01): 6,546
  - Density: 70.28/km^{2} (182.0/sq mi)
- Time zone: UTC+02:00 (EET)
  - Summer (DST): UTC+03:00 (EEST)
- Postal code: 417235
- Area code: (+40) 02 59
- Vehicle reg.: BH

Diosig (Hungarian: Bihardiószeg) is a commune in Bihor County, Crișana, Romania with a population of 6,816 people. It is composed of two villages, Diosig and Ianca (Jankafalva).

The commune is located in the northwestern part of the county, on the banks of the river Ier. Diosig lies on the border with Hungary, 35 km (22 mi) north of the county seat, Oradea. It is crossed by national road DN19, which runs from Oradea to the cities of Carei, Satu Mare, and Sighetu Marmației to the northeast.

At the 2002 census, 56.5% of inhabitants were Hungarians, 32.6% Romanians and 10.7% Roma. 53.4% were Reformed, 27.7% Romanian Orthodox, 8.2% Roman Catholic, 4.9% Pentecostal, 2.2% Seventh-Day Adventist and 1.5% Baptist.

== See also ==
- Skirmish at Diosig
