= HŽ series 1161 =

Class of 2 Croatian electric locomotives

1161 (former 362)
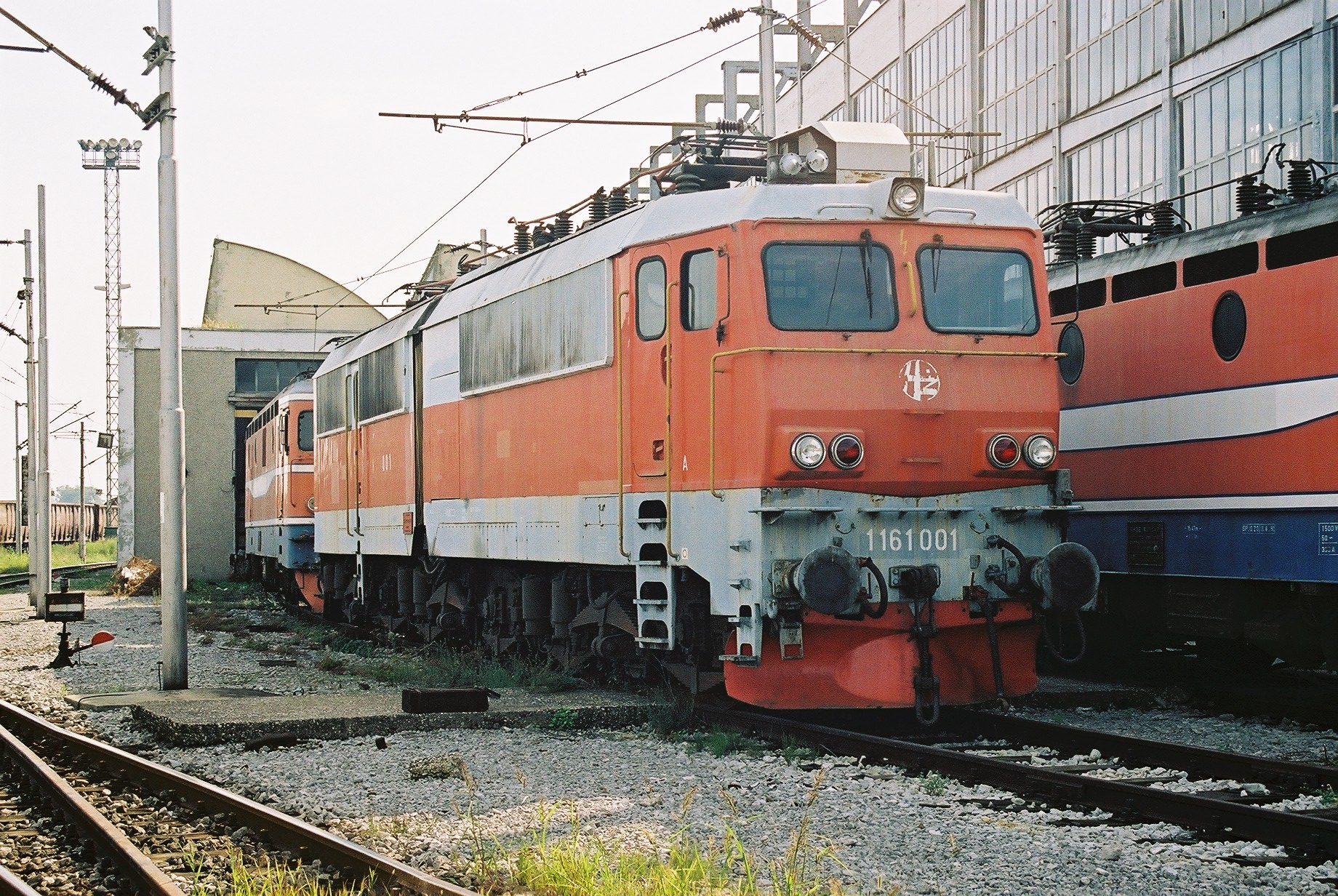
- HŽ 1161 001 at Zagreb railway station
Type and origin
- Power type: Electric
- Builder: Zagreb Railway Works
- Build date: 1988 (1161 001); 1991 (1161 002)
- Total produced: 2
Specifications
- Configuration
  - AAR: B-B-B
  - UIC: Bo′Bo′Bo′
- Gauge: 4 ft 8 1/2 in (1,435 mm) standard gauge
- Length: 15,500 mm (50 ft 10 in)
- Loco weight: 129 short tons (117 t; 115 long tons)
- Electric system/s: 250 A, 25000/2 V AC, 50 Hz
Performance figures
- Maximum speed: 120 km/h (75 mph)
Career
- Nicknames: "Samanta"
- Locale: Croatia

The HŽ Series 1161 is an experimental electric locomotive series belonging to Croatian Railways (Croatian: hrvatske željeznice, HŽ).

== Prototype ==
The two units of JŽ 462 (HŽ 1161) series were converted from the JŽ 362 (HŽ 1061) series. The reelectrification of the Zagreb – Rijeka line was planned, involving change from 3 kV DC to 25 kV 50 Hz AC. To keep costs down, it was planned to reuse as many parts as possible. Also, newly used parts had to be compatible with the JŽ 441 (HŽ 1141). The modified locomotive had also to comply with the technical regulations.

The bogies were reused, the main frame was reinforced. The traction motors and pantographs had to be modified for the higher voltage.

Newly used parts included: the main transformer, new direction switch, new electrical amplifier, new air compressor and some parts of the pneumatic devices.

It is the first six-axle locomotive at Croatian Railways. The 1061 number was changed to 1161, in order to indicate a new subseries.

== History ==
- First unit: arrival at Zagreb Workshop on 1980/06/25.
- Second unit: had been waiting at the workshop since 1979/07/28.

== Testing program ==
On 23 March first test drive was performed. The unit was permitted into the traffic. The locomotive was further tested.

== Reason for abandoning the serial production ==
Serial production never happened. Although Zagreb Workshop showed, that it could do the job, the real full re-electrification of Zagreb-Rijeka line has not happened yet. Croatian Railways do today rent multi-system locomotives in order to drive the whole line non-stop. A power conversion on the total line is slated to be finished soon.

== Liveries ==
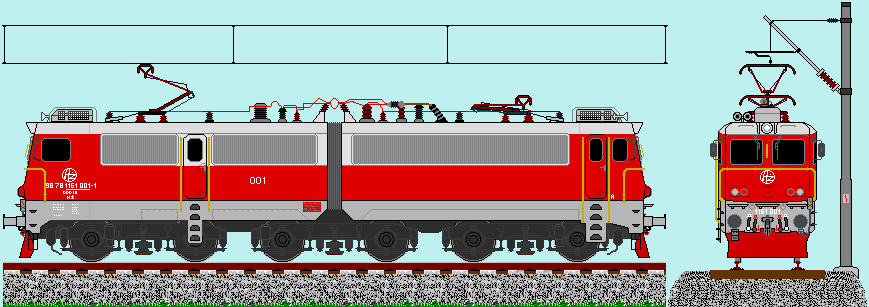
HŽ 1161 (Drawing by Vice Huljev)

These two locomotives had different liveries. One had the red livery, reassembling the original "ASEA" colouring, and the other one had grey livery with blue stripes. The grey with blue livery was later chosen as Croatian Railways standard company livery.

== Possibilities in the future ==
The 1061 and subsequently 1161 have reached almost the end of their useful life. Probably, newer and more modern locomotives will be purchased to serve Zagreb-Rijeka line. Either the experience from this two prototypes will be used to modernise series 1061 to 1161, once Zagreb-Rijeka line gets consistent voltage, or this units just were a successful experiment, but performed in wrong time.
