= Osijek railway station =

Railway station in Osijek, Croatia

Osijek
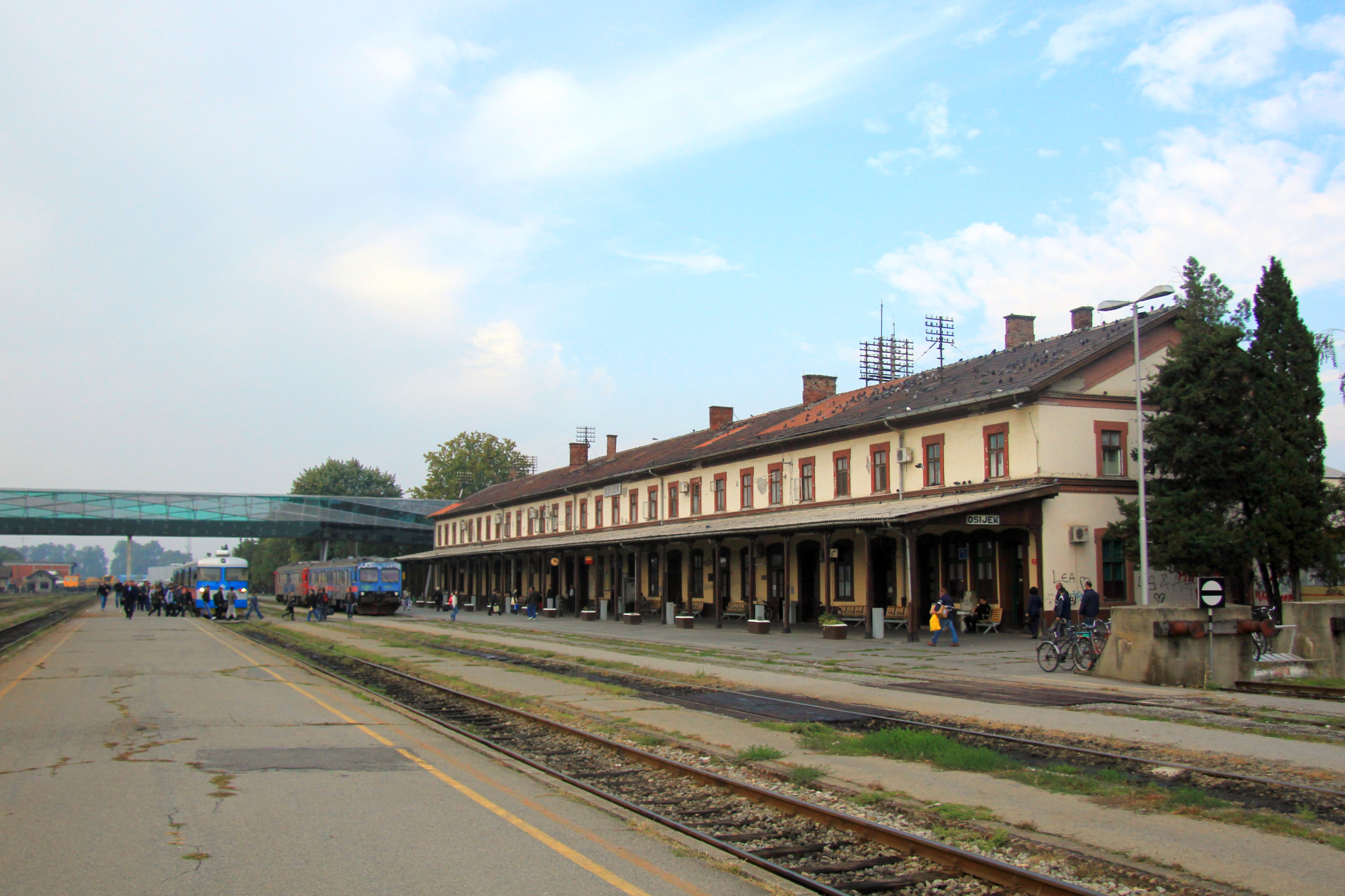
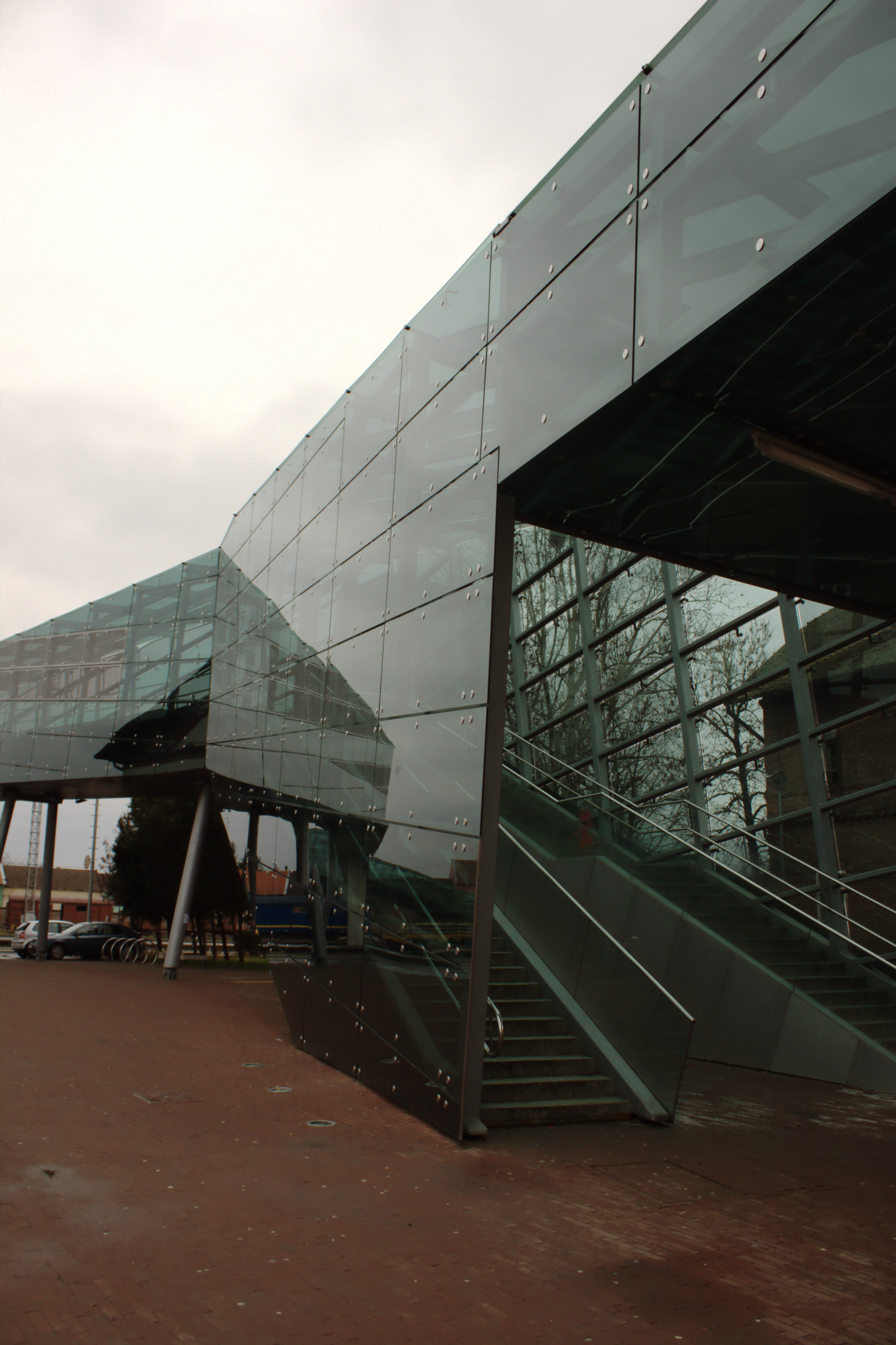
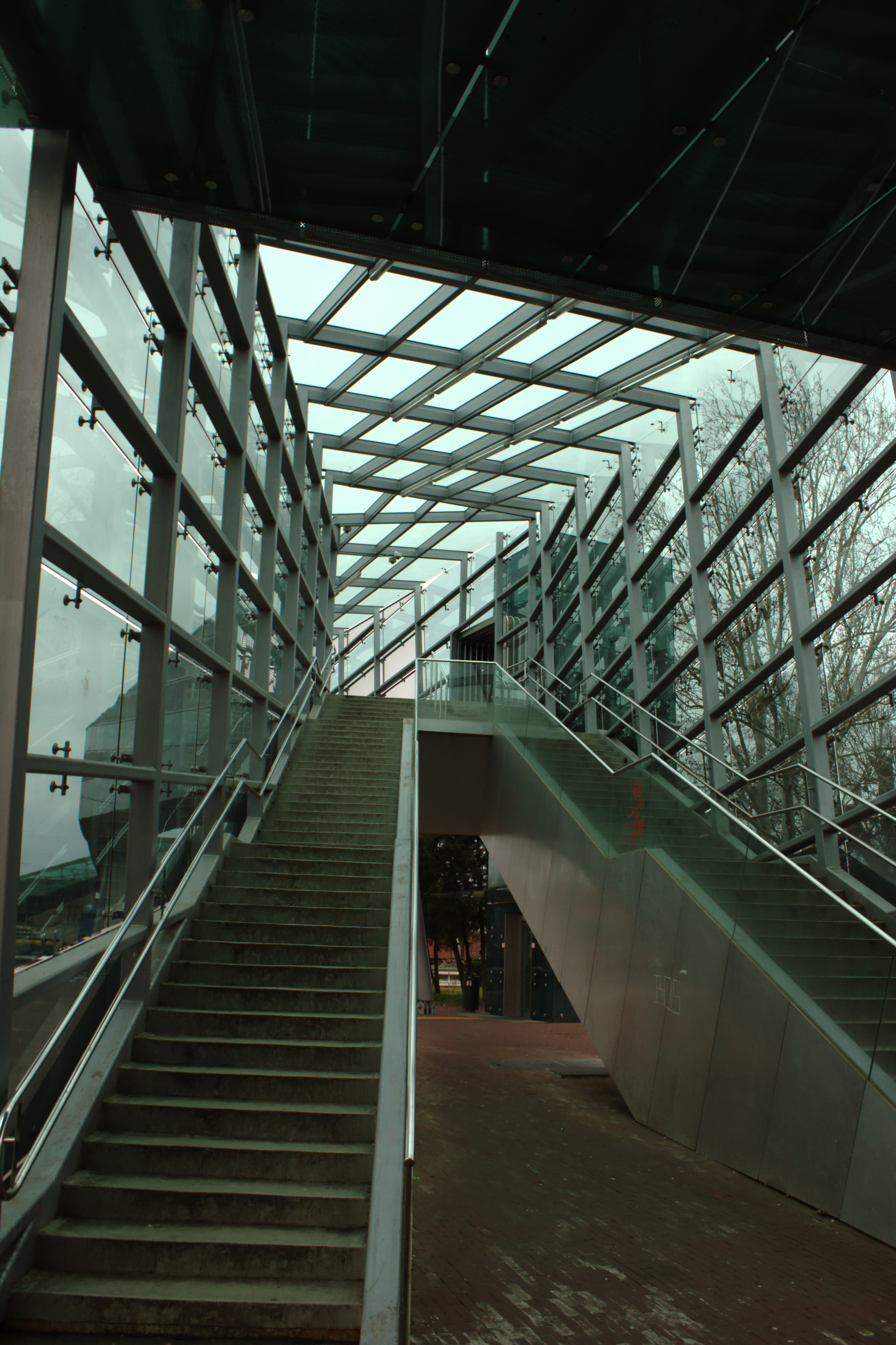
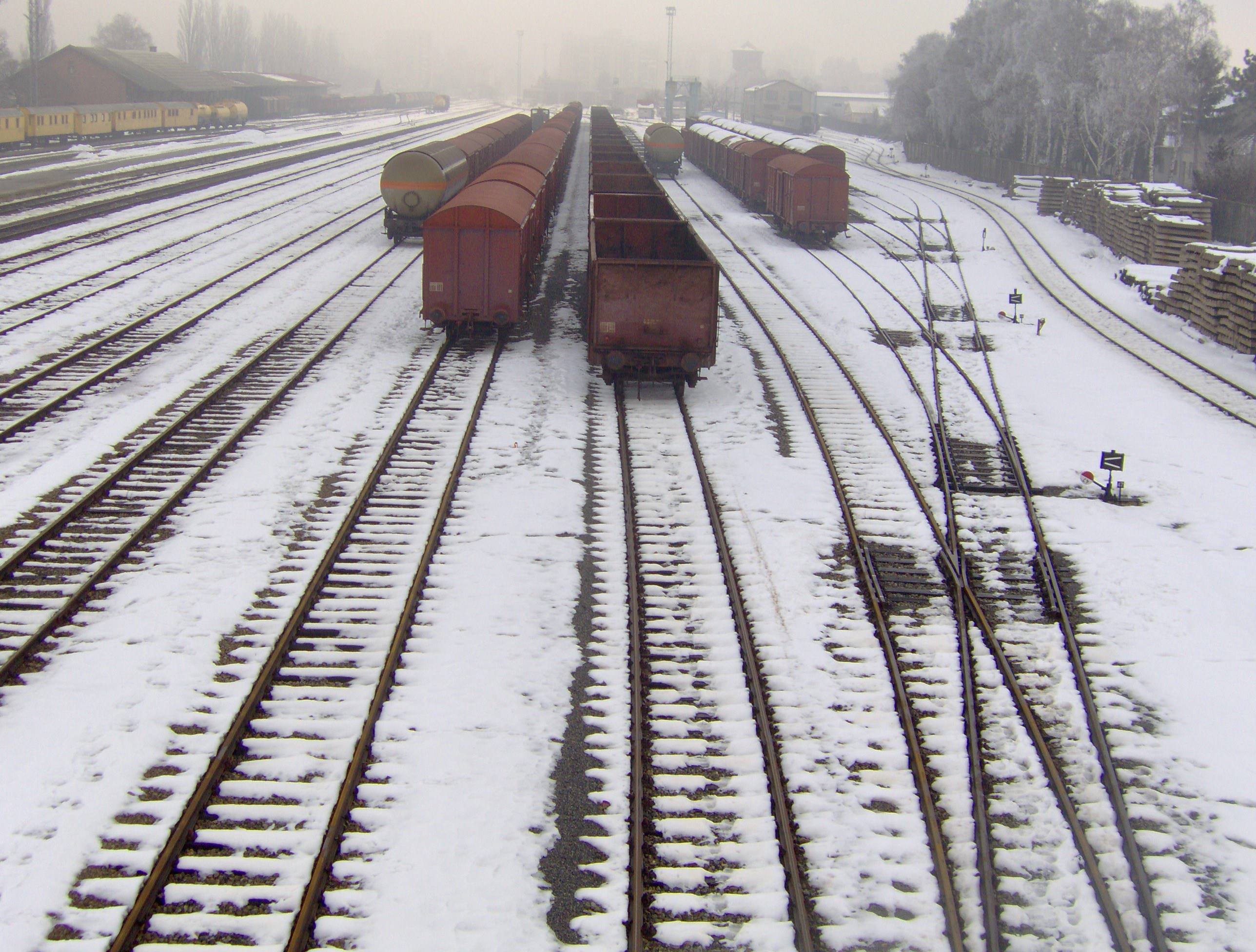

General information
- Location: Trg Lavoslava Ružičke 2, 31000 Osijek; Croatia
- Coordinates: 45.5529°N 18.6835°E
- Operated by: Croatian Railways
- Lines: M301, M302, R202, L208
- Platforms: 5
- Tracks: 18 (6 passenger, 12 freight)
Location

Osijek railway station (Croatian: Željeznički kolodvor Osijek) is the principal railway station in Osijek and one of the larger stations in Croatia. It is located on Lavoslav Ružička Square in the centre of Osijek.
