= Begluci =

Begluci may refer to:

- Begluci, Bosnia and Herzegovina, a village near Derventa
- Begluci, Croatia, a village near Gračac
