= Puhovo =

Puhovo may refer to:

- Puhovo, Serbia, a village near Lučani
- Puhovo, Croatia, a village near Dugo Selo
