= Dugo Polje =

Dugo Polje, which translates as Long Field from Serbo-Croatian, may refer to:

- Dugo Polje (Sokobanja), village in Sokobanja municipality, Serbia
- Dugo Polje (Modriča), village in Modriča municipality, Bosnia and Herzegovina
- Dugo Polje (Kiseljak), village in Kiseljak municipality, Bosnia and Herzegovina
- Dugopolje, village, municipality and karst polje in Split-Dalmatia County, Croatia
- Dugopolje, Zadar County, village in Zadar County, Croatia
- Dugo Polje, Dugi Otok, karst polje on Dugi Otok, Croatia
- Dugo Polje, Mljet, karst polje on Mljet, Croatia
- Dugo Polje, Ravni Kotari, karst polje in the Ravni Kotari region of Croatia
- Dugo Polje, Rovinj, karst polje near Rovinj, Croatia
