= Dugopolje =

- Municipality
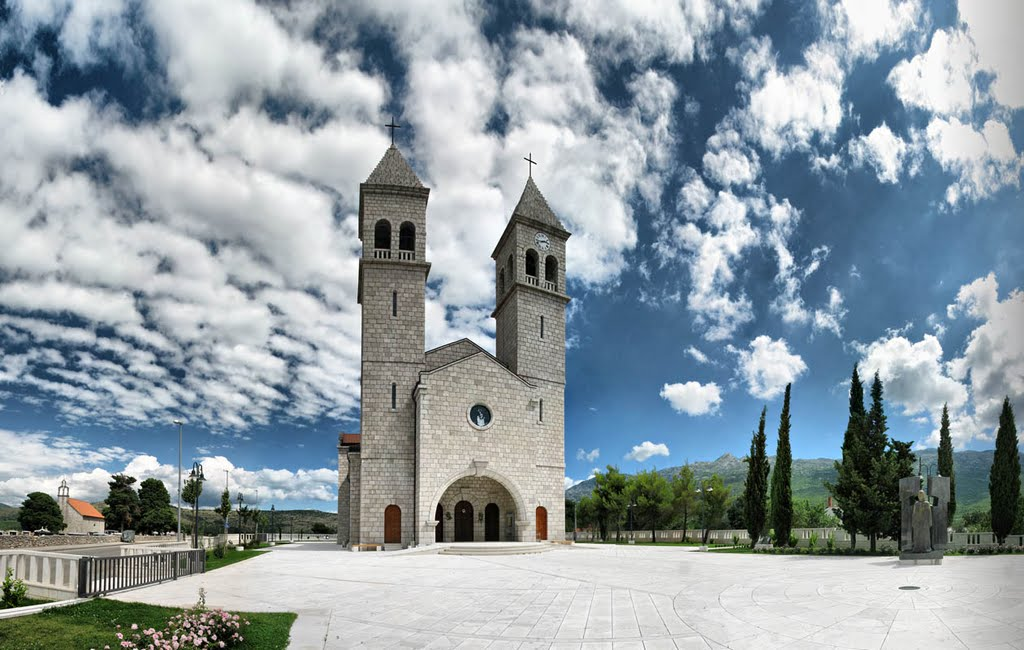

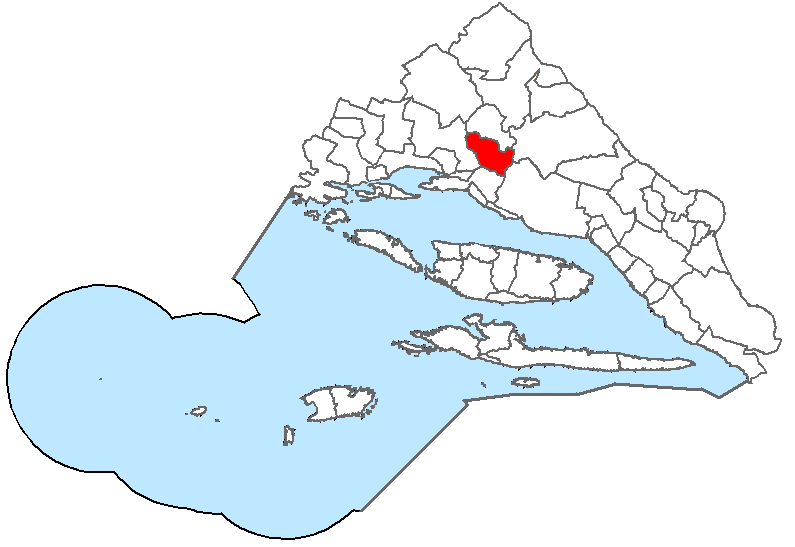
- Interactive map of Dugopolje
- Location within Croatia
- Coordinates: 43°35′N 16°36′E
- Country: Croatia
- Region: Dalmatian Hinterland
- County: Split-Dalmatia County

Area
  - Municipality: 63.6 km^{2} (24.6 sq mi)
  - Urban: 37.7 km^{2} (14.6 sq mi)

Population (2021)
  - Municipality: 3,742
  - Density: 58.8/km^{2} (152/sq mi)
  - Urban: 3,248
  - Urban density: 86.2/km^{2} (223/sq mi)
- Time zone: UTC+1 (CET)
  - Summer (DST): UTC+2 (CEST)
- Website: dugopolje.hr

Dugopolje is a village and a municipality in Croatia in the Split-Dalmatia County.

== Name ==
The name Dugopolje literally translates as 'long field'. There are other villages by that name, as well as poljes like one in the eponymous municipality, one on Dugi Otok, one on Mljet, one in Ravni Kotari, one near Rovinj, and a number of fields: in Andrilovec, one by Farkaševac, one in Lađevac, one in Osijek, one in Sveti Lovreč.

== Demographics ==
In the 2021 census, the total population of the municipality was 3,742, in the following settlements:

- Dugopolje, population 2,993
- Koprivno, population 272
- Kotlenice, population 148
- Liska, population 56

In the same census, 99.5% were Croats.

Dugopolje: Population trends 1857–2021
v

population	1837	1977	2168	2297	2583	2952	2957	3275	3120	3125	3386	3381	3175	3075	3120	3469	3742
	1857	1869	1880	1890	1900	1910	1921	1931	1948	1953	1961	1971	1981	1991	2001	2011	2021

Sources: Croatian Bureau of Statistics publications

== Location ==
Noted in Dugopolje is Vranjača cave. Dugopolje is located 15 kilometres (9.3 mi) from the city of Split.

Dugopolje is located at the junction of the A1 Zagreb–Split–Dubrovnik motorway linking the north and the south of Croatia and the D1 Split-Sinj state road linking the coast and the hinterland of Central Dalmatia. Split Airport is 28 km from Dugopolje, making the area an attractive place to stay for those wanting to avoid crowded areas closer to Split. Other transportation options are also close by with the Split ferry terminal and Split railway station less than 20 km away.

== Main sites ==
=== Vranjača Cave ===
Located a short drive from Dugopolje in the village of Kotlenice (in the Dalmatian hinterland), the Vranjača Cave is increasingly becoming a popular tourist destination for those interested in exploring nature.

The 65 meter deep cave was first discovered in 1903 by Stipe Punda and first became open to the public in 1929. The cave is estimated to be 65 to 70 million years old.

== History ==
Dugopolje's first mentioning dates back to 1283, when it was under the administration of neighbouring Klis

The area near the Kapela hamlet is a site of a former Roman road bifurcation of the Salona - Aequum pathway and Tilurium - Argentaria pathway. Many graveyards from approximately the 4th century were found nearby, implying that the Ilyrians descended from the hills and built a settlement there road-side.

While Dugopolje was not harmed in World War I, World War II brought many devastations. The village was damaged by all the sides, whether it was Italians, Germans, Chetniks or Partisans. It was first sieged by Italians in January 1942 on their way to Split through the Rera railway, killing 7 peasants and burning down several houses in the process. In April 1942 partisans killed Don Šimun Karaman, a local priest.

Perhaps the most noted massacre of Croats in Dugopolje and its neighbouring villages, occurred in October 1942. It was committed by Chetniks, supported by Italian forces. The October 1942 massacre took place at the same time as the Gata massacre, that was also nearby; Chetnik and Italian forces killed at least thirty-two Croat civilians while Croatian historian Zdravko Dizdar mentions 120 civilians killed in Dugopolje and neighbouring villages.

By the end of 1943, over 300 houses were burnt down by numerous sides, and many civilians were murdered. Dugopolje fell into the Partisan arms in late 1944.

After World War II, Dugopolje was a part of Yugoslavia, and fell under the administration of Solin municipality, and eventually had electricity and waterlines installed. Many inhabitants of the village took part in the Croatian War of Independence, although the village itself wasn't harmed during the period. After the war, Dugopolje gained its own municipality and the leading local party was HDZ. At first, it was a transit spot for passengers on the D1 road between Split and Sinj, but in the early 21st century, the A1 motorway was built, and Dugopolje became the important intersection towards Split, thus providing the opportunity to Zlatko Ževrnja who was the Dugopolje mayor at the time, to design and build the biggest industrial zone in Dalmatia, which at one point had more people working in it than the population of the whole village.

== People from Dugopolje ==
- Andrija Balić (born 1997), football player
- Petar Bosančić (born 1996), football player
- Mijo Caktaš (born 1992), football player
- Josip Radošević (born 1994), football player
- Lorenco Šimić (born 1996), football player
- Ivano Balić, handball player

== See also ==
- Jadro River
- NK Dugopolje
- Split
