= Liska =

Liska may refer to:

- Liška, a surname of Czech origin, includes a list of people with the name
- Liska March (1906–2003), American dancer and actress
- Liska, Hungary, an alternative name for Olaszliszka, a town near Sárospatak
- Liske (Hasidic dynasty), named for this town
- Liska, Croatia, a village near Trilj
