= Donje Dvorišće =

- Settlement
- Location within Croatia
- Country: Croatia
- County: Zagreb
- Town: Dugo Selo

Area
  - Total: 1.6 km^{2} (0.62 sq mi)

Population (2021)
  - Total: 172
  - Density: 110/km^{2} (280/sq mi)
- Time zone: UTC+1 (CET)
  - Summer (DST): UTC+2 (CEST)

Donje Dvorišće is a settlement in the Dugo Selo town of Zagreb County, Croatia. As of 2011 it had a population of 188 people.
