= Duboki Dol =

Duboki Dol Дубоки Дол (Serbian)
- Village
- Location within Croatia
- Coordinates: 44°13′48″N 15°56′53″E
- Country: Croatia
- County: Zadar County
- Municipality: Gračac

Area
  - Total: 25.2 km^{2} (9.7 sq mi)
- Elevation: 558 m (1,831 ft)

Population (2021)
  - Total: 0
  - Density: 0.0/km^{2} (0.0/sq mi)
- Time zone: UTC+1 (CET)
  - Summer (DST): UTC+2 (CEST)
- Postal code: 23440 Gračac
- Area code: +385 (23)

Duboki Dol (Serbian Cyrillic: Дубоки Дол) is a village in Croatia.

== Population ==
According to the 2011 census, Duboki Dol was uninhabited.

Population
1857	1869	1880	1890	1900	1910	1921	1931	1948	1953	1961	1971	1981	1991	2001	2011
0	0	138	181	237	261	270	279	143	151	124	97	64	32	0	0

Napomena: It is formed as independent settlement in 1880.

=== 1991 census ===
According to the 1991 census, settlement of Duboki Dol had 32 inhabitants, which were ethnically declared as this:

Duboki Dol
1991
total: 32
1. Serbs 32 (100.0%)

=== Austro-hungarian 1910 census ===
According to the 1910 census, settlement of Duboki Dol had 261 inhabitants in 4 hamlets, which were linguistically and religiously declared as this:

Population by language	Croatian or Serbian
Duboki Dol	167
Jelovac Gračački	22
Vučjak Gračački	24
Turovac	48
Total	261 (100%)

Population by religion	Eastern Orthodox	Roman Catholics
Duboki Dol	94	73
Jelovac Gračački	1	21
Vučjak Gračački	24	-
Turovac	41	7
Total	160 (61.30%)	101 (38.69%)

== Literature ==
- Savezni zavod za statistiku i evidenciju FNRJ i SFRJ, popis stanovništva 1948, 1953, 1961, 1971, 1981. i 1991. godine.
- Knjiga: "Narodnosni i vjerski sastav stanovništva Hrvatske, 1880–1991: po naseljima, author: Jakov Gelo, izdavač: Državni zavod za statistiku Republike Hrvatske, 1998., ISBN 953-6667-07-X, ISBN 978-953-6667-07-9;
