= Velika Ostrna =

Coordinates: 45°47′N 16°18′E

- Settlement
- Location within Croatia
- Country: Croatia
- County: Zagreb
- Town: Dugo Selo

Area
  - Total: 6.8 km^{2} (2.6 sq mi)

Population (2021)
  - Total: 1,136
  - Density: 170/km^{2} (430/sq mi)
- Time zone: UTC+1 (CET)
  - Summer (DST): UTC+2 (CEST)

Velika Ostrna is a settlement in the Dugo Selo town of Zagreb County, Croatia. As of 2011 it had a population of 1,271 people.
