= Rudopolje Bruvanjsko =

Rudopolje Bruvanjsko Рудопоље Брувањско (Serbian)
- Village
- Location within Croatia
- Coordinates: 44°23′48″N 15°49′35″E
- Country: Croatia
- County: Zadar County
- Municipality: Gračac

Area
  - Total: 56.2 km^{2} (21.7 sq mi)
- Elevation: 678 m (2,224 ft)

Population (2021)
  - Total: 30
  - Density: 0.53/km^{2} (1.4/sq mi)
- Time zone: UTC+1 (CET)
  - Summer (DST): UTC+2 (CEST)
- Postal code: 23440 Gračac
- Area code: +385 (23)

Rudopolje Bruvanjsko (Serbian Cyrillic: Рудопоље Брувањско) is a village in Croatia.

== History ==
On 26 March 2022 at 10:30 the ŽVOC Zadar received a call about a wildfire in the area. 10 hectares (25 acres) burned by the time it was put out at 13:40 by IVP Zadar and VP Gračac.

== Population ==
According to the 2011 census, Rudopolje Bruvanjsko had 31 inhabitants.

Population
| 1857 | 1869 | 1880 | 1890 | 1900 | 1910 | 1921 | 1931 | 1948 | 1953 | 1961 | 1971 | 1981 | 1991 | 2001 | 2011 |
| 315 | 1,274 | 1,095 | 1,338 | 1,456 | 1,340 | 1,268 | 1,288 | 634 | 607 | 575 | 396 | 280 | 212 | 31 | 31 |

Napomena: Till 1910 name of the settlement was Rudopolje. In 1857 part of data is in the settlement of Bruvno. It include data for the former settlement of Klapavica Bruvanjska.

=== 1991 census ===
According to the 1991 census, settlement of Rudopolje Bruvanjsko had 212 inhabitants, which were ethnically declared as this:

Rudopolje Bruvanjsko
1991
total: 212
1. Serbs 203 (95.8%)
2. Croats 6 (2.83%)
3. unknown 3 (1.41%)

=== Austro-hungarian 1910 census ===
According to the 1910 census, settlement of Rudopolje Bruvanjsko had 1,340 inhabitants in 5 hamlets, which were linguistically and religiously declared as this:

| Population by language | Croatian or Serbian |
|---|---|
| Jasenar Bruvanjski | 188 |
| Klapavica Bruvanjska | 153 |
| Obradovići | 119 |
| Paklarić | 87 |
| Rudopolje | 793 |
| Total | 1,340 (100%) |

| Population by religion | Eastern Orthodox | Roman Catholics |
|---|---|---|
| Jasenar Bruvanjski | 24 | 164 |
| Klapavica Bruvanjska | 129 | 24 |
| Obradovići | 119 | - |
| Paklarić | 55 | 32 |
| Rudopolje | 545 | 248 |
| Total | 872 (65.07%) | 468 (34.92%) |

== Literature ==
- Savezni zavod za statistiku i evidenciju FNRJ i SFRJ, popis stanovništva 1948, 1953, 1961, 1971, 1981. i 1991. godine.
- Knjiga: "Narodnosni i vjerski sastav stanovništva Hrvatske, 1880–1991: po naseljima, author: Jakov Gelo, izdavač: Državni zavod za statistiku Republike Hrvatske, 1998., ISBN 953-6667-07-X, ISBN 978-953-6667-07-9;
