= Kijani killings =

1995 mass killing by the Croatian Army in Kijani, Croatia

Kijani Massacre
- Location: Kijani, Croatia
- Date: August–September 1995
- Target: Elderly Croatian Serb villagers
- Attack type: Mass killing
- Deaths: 14
- Perpetrator: Croatian Army (HV)

The Kijani killings refers to the mass murder of elderly Serb civilians from the village of Kijani near the town of Gračac by members of the Croatian Army (HV) during and following Operation Storm.

== Background ==
By March 1991, tensions between Croats and Serbs escalated into the Croatian War of Independence. Following a referendum on independence that was largely boycotted by Croatian Serbs, the Croatian parliament officially adopted independence on 25 June. The Republic of Serb Krajina (RSK) declared its intention to secede from Croatia and join the Republic of Serbia while the Government of the Republic of Croatia declared it a rebellion. Between August 1991 and February 1992, the RSK initiated an ethnic cleansing campaign to drive out the Croat and non-Serb population from RSK-held territory, eventually expelling as many as 250,000 people according to Human Rights Watch. Croatian forces also engaged in ethnic cleansing against Serbs in Eastern and Western Slavonia and parts of the Krajina on a more limited scale. On 4 August 1995, the Croatian Army (HV) launched Operation Storm to retake the Krajina region which was completed successfully by 7 August. The Operation resulted in the exodus of approximately 200,000 Serbs from Krajina while those Serbs who were unable or unwilling to leave their homes, primarily the elderly, were subjected to various crimes. The ICTY puts the number of Serb civilians killed at 324.

== Killings ==
According to reports, at least 14 Serb civilians were killed in the village of Kijani near the town of Gračac, in the aftermath of Operation Storm. The victims included nine women. The youngest was 50 years old and the oldest was 90. According to testimonies for the International Court of Justice by villagers who managed to hide in a forest, women were raped and at least one victim was beheaded.

== Trial ==
In 2014, Rajko Kričković, an ex-soldier was indicted by Croatia for the murder of three of the civilians. He was accused of shooting 73-year-old Mara Sovilj and her 43-year-old son Radomir, and killing his 45-year-old sister Mira by burning her alive in their house. In 2019, Kričković was found guilty and sentenced to 10 years in prison by the Rijeka County Court in Croatia.
