= Glogovo, Croatia =

Glogovo Глогово (Serbian)
- Village
- Location within Croatia
- Coordinates: 44°18′50″N 15°56′55″E
- Country: Croatia
- County: Zadar County
- Municipality: Gračac

Area
  - Total: 23.5 km^{2} (9.1 sq mi)
- Elevation: 818 m (2,684 ft)

Population (2021)
  - Total: 3
  - Density: 0.13/km^{2} (0.33/sq mi)
- Time zone: UTC+1 (CET)
  - Summer (DST): UTC+2 (CEST)
- Postal code: 23440 Gračac
- Area code: +385 (23)

Glogovo (Serbian Cyrillic: Глогово) is a village in Croatia.

== Population ==
According to the 2011 census, Glogovo had 11 inhabitants.

Population
1857	1869	1880	1890	1900	1910	1921	1931	1948	1953	1961	1971	1981	1991	2001	2011
0	0	311	419	496	460	451	465	242	251	217	134	85	66	20	11

Napomena: In 1857 and 1869 data is include in the settlements of Gračac and Kijani, and in 1880 part of data is include in the settlement of Kijani.

=== 1991 census ===
According to the 1991 census, settlement of Glogovo had 66 inhabitants, which were ethnically declared as this:

Glogovo
1991
total: 66
1. Serbs 65 (98.5%)
2. Croats 1 (1.51%)

=== Austro-hungarian 1910 census ===
According to the 1910 census, settlement of Glogovo had 460 inhabitants in 2 hamlets, which were linguistically and religiously declared as this:

Population by language	Croatian or Serbian
Glogovo	392
Grcala	68
Total	460 (100%)

Population by religion	Eastern Orthodox	Roman Catholics
Glogovo	391	1
Grcala	68	-
Total	459 (99.78%)	1 (0.21%)

== Literature ==
- Savezni zavod za statistiku i evidenciju FNRJ i SFRJ, popis stanovništva 1948, 1953, 1961, 1971, 1981. i 1991. godine.
- Knjiga: "Narodnosni i vjerski sastav stanovništva Hrvatske, 1880–1991: po naseljima, author: Jakov Gelo, izdavač: Državni zavod za statistiku Republike Hrvatske, 1998., ISBN 953-6667-07-X, ISBN 978-953-6667-07-9;
