= Gubavčevo Polje =

Gubavčevo Polje Губавчево Поље (Serbian)
- Village
- Location within Croatia
- Coordinates: 44°20′28″N 15°56′10″E
- Country: Croatia
- County: Zadar County
- Municipality: Gračac

Area
  - Total: 12.6 km^{2} (4.9 sq mi)
- Elevation: 763 m (2,503 ft)

Population (2021)
  - Total: 2
  - Density: 0.16/km^{2} (0.41/sq mi)
- Time zone: UTC+1 (CET)
  - Summer (DST): UTC+2 (CEST)
- Postal code: 23440 Gračac
- Area code: +385 (23)

Gubavčevo Polje (Serbian Cyrillic: Губавчево Поље) is a village in Croatia.

== Population ==
According to the 2011 census, Gubavčevo Polje had 3 inhabitants.

Population
1857	1869	1880	1890	1900	1910	1921	1931	1948	1953	1961	1971	1981	1991	2001	2011
0	0	0	95	281	426	392	425	363	334	314	235	119	59	15	3

Napomena: Till 1948 it was part of the settlement (hamlet). In census period 1857–1880 data is include in the settlement of Kijani.

=== 1991 census ===
According to the 1991 census, settlement of Gubavčevo Polje had 59 inhabitants, which were ethnically declared as this:

Gubavčevo Polje
1991
total: 59
1. Serbs 59 (100.0%)

=== Austro-hungarian 1910 census ===
According to the 1910 census, settlement of Gubavčevo Polje had 426 inhabitants in 3 hamlets, which were linguistically and religiously declared as this:

Population by language	Croatian or Serbian	Hungarian
Gubavčevo Polje	235	1
Podbakovača	137	-
Vrela	53	-
Total	425 (99.76%)	1 (0.23%)

Population by religion	Eastern Orthodox
Gubavčevo Polje	236
Podbakovača	137
Vrela	53
Total	426 (100%)

== Literature ==
- Savezni zavod za statistiku i evidenciju FNRJ i SFRJ, popis stanovništva 1948, 1953, 1961, 1971, 1981. i 1991. godine.
- Knjiga: "Narodnosni i vjerski sastav stanovništva Hrvatske, 1880–1991: po naseljima, author: Jakov Gelo, izdavač: Državni zavod za statistiku Republike Hrvatske, 1998., ISBN 953-6667-07-X, ISBN 978-953-6667-07-9;
