= Kunovac Kupirovački =

Kunovac Kupirovački Куновац Купировачки (Serbian)
- Village
- Location within Croatia
- Coordinates: 44°19′51″N 16°07′30″E
- Country: Croatia
- County: Zadar County
- Municipality: Gračac

Area
  - Total: 13.9 km^{2} (5.4 sq mi)
- Elevation: 476 m (1,562 ft)

Population (2021)
  - Total: 29
  - Density: 2.1/km^{2} (5.4/sq mi)
- Time zone: UTC+1 (CET)
  - Summer (DST): UTC+2 (CEST)
- Postal code: 23445 Srb
- Area code: +385 (23)

Kunovac Kupirovački (Serbian Cyrillic: Куновац Купировачки) is a village in Croatia.

== Population ==
According to the 2011 census, Kunovac Kupirovački had 37 inhabitants.

Population
1857	1869	1880	1890	1900	1910	1921	1931	1948	1953	1961	1971	1981	1991	2001	2011
0	0	0	351	405	406	413	349	259	254	232	194	133	103	35	37

Note: Till the year 1900 name of the settlement was Kunovac, and from 1910-1931 Kunovac Kupirovski. Data for years 1857-1880 is included in the settlement of Kupirovo.

=== 1991 census ===
According to the 1991 census, Kunovac Kupirovački had 103 inhabitants, which were ethnically declared as this:

Kunovac Kupirovački
1991
total: 103
1. Serbs 101 (98.0%)
2. Croats 1 (0.97%)
3. unknown 1 (0.97%)

=== Austro-hungarian 1910 census ===
According to the 1910 census, Kunovac Kupirovački had 406 inhabitants, which were linguistically and religiously declared as this:

Population by language	Croatian or Serbian
Kunovac Kupirovski	406
Total	406 (100%)

Population by religion	Eastern Orthodox
Kunovac Kupirovski	406
Total	406 (100%)

== Literature ==
- Savezni zavod za statistiku i evidenciju FNRJ i SFRJ, popis stanovništva 1948, 1953, 1961, 1971, 1981. i 1991. godine.
- Knjiga: "Narodnosni i vjerski sastav stanovništva Hrvatske, 1880-1991: po naseljima, author: Jakov Gelo, izdavač: Državni zavod za statistiku Republike Hrvatske, 1998., ISBN 953-6667-07-X, ISBN 978-953-6667-07-9;
