= Leprovica =

Coordinates: 45°46′N 16°17′E

- Settlement
- Location within Croatia
- Country: Croatia
- County: Zagreb
- Town: Dugo Selo

Area
  - Total: 4.3 km^{2} (1.7 sq mi)

Population (2021)
  - Total: 280
  - Density: 65/km^{2} (170/sq mi)
- Time zone: UTC+1 (CET)
  - Summer (DST): UTC+2 (CEST)

Leprovica is a settlement in the Dugo Selo town of Zagreb County, Croatia. As of 2011 it had a population of 254 people.
