= Drenovac Osredački =

Village in Zadar County, Croatia

Drenovac Osredački Дреновац Осредачки (Serbian)
- Village
- Location within Croatia
- Coordinates: 44°13′42″N 16°13′01″E
- Country: Croatia
- County: Zadar County
- Municipality: Gračac

Area
  - Total: 15.6 km^{2} (6.0 sq mi)
- Elevation: 454 m (1,490 ft)

Population (2021)
  - Total: 8
  - Density: 0.51/km^{2} (1.3/sq mi)
- Time zone: UTC+1 (CET)
  - Summer (DST): UTC+2 (CEST)
- Postal code: 23446 Kaldrma
- Area code: +385 (23)

Drenovac Osredački (Serbian Cyrillic: Дреновац Осредачки) is a village in Croatia.

== Population ==
According to the 2011 census, Drenovac Osredački had 12 inhabitants.

Population
1857	1869	1880	1890	1900	1910	1921	1931	1948	1953	1961	1971	1981	1991	2001	2011
124	143	110	136	188	191	175	165	75	132	136	85	74	72	12	12

Note: Till 1900 its name was Drenovac.

=== 1991 census ===
According to the 1991 census, settlement of Drenovac Osredački had 72 inhabitants, which were ethnically declared as this:

Drenovac Osredački
1991
total: 72
1. Serbs 72 (100.0%)

=== Austro-hungarian 1910 census ===
According to the 1910 census, settlement of Drenovac Osredački had 191 inhabitants in 2 hamlets, which were linguistically and religiously declared as this:

Population by language	Croatian or Serbian
Osredački Drenovac	126
Ševina Poljana	65
Total	191 (100%)

Population by religion	Eastern Orthodox
Osredački Drenovac	126
Ševina Poljana	65
Total	191 (100%)

== Literature ==
- Savezni zavod za statistiku i evidenciju FNRJ i SFRJ, popis stanovništva 1948, 1953, 1961, 1971, 1981. i 1991. godine.
- Knjiga: "Narodnosni i vjerski sastav stanovništva Hrvatske, 1880-1991: po naseljima, author: Jakov Gelo, izdavač: Državni zavod za statistiku Republike Hrvatske, 1998., ISBN 953-6667-07-X, ISBN 978-953-6667-07-9;
