= Deringaj =

Deringaj Дерингај (Serbian)
- Village
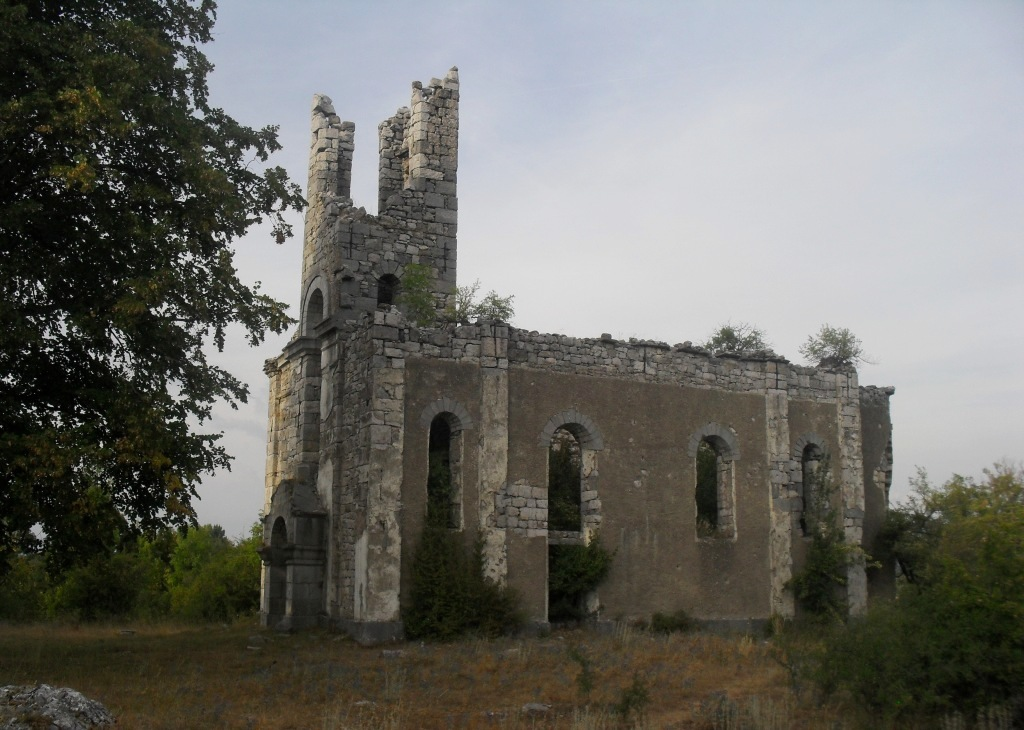
- Deringaj, serb orthodox church "Dormition of the Mother of God", ruined in World War II

- Location within Croatia
- Coordinates: 44°20′47″N 15°52′14″E
- Country: Croatia
- County: Zadar County
- Municipality: Gračac

Area
  - Total: 15.5 km^{2} (6.0 sq mi)
- Elevation: 618 m (2,028 ft)

Population (2021)
  - Total: 68
  - Density: 4.4/km^{2} (11/sq mi)
- Time zone: UTC+1 (CET)
  - Summer (DST): UTC+2 (CEST)
- Postal code: 23440 Gračac
- Area code: +385 (23)

Deringaj (Serbian Cyrillic: Дерингај) is a village in Croatia.

== Population ==
According to the 2011 census, Deringaj had 77 inhabitants.

Population
1857	1869	1880	1890	1900	1910	1921	1931	1948	1953	1961	1971	1981	1991	2001	2011
561	650	501	387	475	432	454	427	281	404	380	322	258	183	52	77

=== 1991 census ===
According to the 1991 census, settlement of Deringaj had 183 inhabitants, which were ethnically declared as this:

Deringaj
1991
total: 183
1. Serbs 181 (98.9%)
2. unknown 2 (1.09%)

=== Austro-hungarian 1910 census ===
According to the 1910 census, settlement of Deringaj had 432 inhabitants in 2 hamlets, which were linguistically and religiously declared as this:

Population by language	Croatian or Serbian
Blanuše	76
Deringaj	356
Total	432 (100%)

Population by religion	Eastern Orthodox
Blanuše	76
Deringaj	356
Total	432 (100%)

== Literature ==
- Savezni zavod za statistiku i evidenciju FNRJ i SFRJ, popis stanovništva 1948, 1953, 1961, 1971, 1981. i 1991. godine.
- Knjiga: "Narodnosni i vjerski sastav stanovništva Hrvatske, 1880–1991: po naseljima, author: Jakov Gelo, izdavač: Državni zavod za statistiku Republike Hrvatske, 1998., ISBN 953-6667-07-X, ISBN 978-953-6667-07-9;
