= Omsica =

Omsica Омсица (Serbian)
- Village
- Location within Croatia
- Coordinates: 44°21′40″N 15°56′06″E
- Country: Croatia
- County: Zadar County
- Municipality: Gračac

Area
  - Total: 18.7 km^{2} (7.2 sq mi)
- Elevation: 758 m (2,487 ft)

Population (2021)
  - Total: 4
  - Density: 0.21/km^{2} (0.55/sq mi)
- Time zone: UTC+1 (CET)
  - Summer (DST): UTC+2 (CEST)
- Postal code: 23440 Gračac
- Area code: +385 (23)

Omsica (Serbian Cyrillic: Омсица) is a village in Croatia.

== Population ==
According to the 2011 census, Omsica had 12 inhabitants.

Population
1857	1869	1880	1890	1900	1910	1921	1931	1948	1953	1961	1971	1981	1991	2001	2011
447	575	443	461	485	455	509	450	367	390	405	298	210	135	10	12

Napomena: Till 1900 name of the settlement was Omšica.

=== 1991 census ===
According to the 1991 census, settlement of Omsica had 135 inhabitants, which were ethnically declared as this:

Omsica
1991
total: 135
1. Serbs 131 (97.0%)
2. unknown 4 (2.96%)

=== Austro-hungarian 1910 census ===
According to the 1910 census, settlement of Omsica had 455 inhabitants in 3 hamlets, which were linguistically and religiously declared as this:

Population by language	Croatian or Serbian
Manojlovići	16
Omsica	387
Poznići	52
Total	455 (100%)

Population by religion	Eastern Orthodox
Manojlovići	16
Omsica	387
Poznići	52
Total	455 (100%)

== Literature ==
- Savezni zavod za statistiku i evidenciju FNRJ i SFRJ, popis stanovništva 1948, 1953, 1961, 1971, 1981. i 1991. godine.
- Knjiga: "Narodnosni i vjerski sastav stanovništva Hrvatske, 1880–1991: po naseljima, author: Jakov Gelo, izdavač: Državni zavod za statistiku Republike Hrvatske, 1998., ISBN 953-6667-07-X, ISBN 978-953-6667-07-9;
