= Tomingaj =

- Village
- Interactive map of Tomingaj
- Location within Croatia
- Coordinates: 44°20′50″N 15°50′32″E
- Country: Croatia
- County: Zadar County
- Municipality: Gračac

Area
  - Total: 13.9 km^{2} (5.4 sq mi)
- Elevation: 610 m (2,000 ft)

Population (2021)
  - Total: 21
  - Density: 1.5/km^{2} (3.9/sq mi)
- Time zone: UTC+1 (CET)
  - Summer (DST): UTC+2 (CEST)
- Postal code: 23440 Gračac
- Area code: +385 (23)

Tomingaj is a village in Croatia. Nikola Tesla lived in Tomingaj in 1874.

== Population ==
In the 2011 census, Tomingaj had 26 inhabitants. In the 2021 census, it had 21 inhabitants.

Tomingaj: Population trends 1857–2021
v

population	1093	1470	1039	1291	1366	1256	1197	1226	761	616	539	432	269	292	21	26	21
	1857	1869	1880	1890	1900	1910	1921	1931	1948	1953	1961	1971	1981	1991	2001	2011	2021

Sources: Croatian Bureau of Statistics publications

=== 1991 census ===
According to the 1991 census, settlement of Tomingaj had 292 inhabitants, which were ethnically declared as this:

Tomingaj
1991
total: 292
1. Serbs 279 (95.5%)
2. unknown 13 (4.45%)

=== Austro-hungarian 1910 census ===
According to the 1910 census, settlement of Tomingaj had 1,256 inhabitants in 8 hamlets, which were linguistically and religiously declared as this:

Population by language	Croatian or Serbian
Čanković-draga	206
Deringaj Gračački	268
Dragosavci	88
Ljubović Tomingajski	19
Tomingaj	355
Tomingaj Bruvanjski	217
Tupala Tomingajska	44
Ušiva Draga	59
Total	1,256 (100%)

Population by religion	Eastern Orthodox
Čanković-draga	206
Deringaj Gračački	268
Dragosavci	88
Ljubović Tomingajski	19
Tomingaj	355
Tomingaj Bruvanjski	217
Tupala Tomingajska	44
Ušiva Draga	59
Total	1,256 (100%)

== Literature ==
- Savezni zavod za statistiku i evidenciju FNRJ i SFRJ, popis stanovništva 1948, 1953, 1961, 1971, 1981. i 1991. godine.
- Knjiga: "Narodnosni i vjerski sastav stanovništva Hrvatske, 1880–1991: po naseljima, author: Jakov Gelo, izdavač: Državni zavod za statistiku Republike Hrvatske, 1998., ISBN 953-6667-07-X, ISBN 978-953-6667-07-9;
