= Kom, Croatia =

Kom Ком (Serbian)
- Village
- Location within Croatia
- Coordinates: 44°08′23″N 16°02′58″E
- Country: Croatia
- County: Zadar County
- Municipality: Gračac

Area
  - Total: 38.5 km^{2} (14.9 sq mi)
- Elevation: 979 m (3,212 ft)

Population (2021)
  - Total: 22
  - Density: 0.57/km^{2} (1.5/sq mi)
- Time zone: UTC+1 (CET)
  - Summer (DST): UTC+2 (CEST)
- Postal code: 23443 Zrmanja
- Area code: +385 (23)

Kom (Serbian Cyrillic: Ком) is a village in Croatia.

== Population ==
According to the 2011 census, Kom had 34 inhabitants.

Population
1857	1869	1880	1890	1900	1910	1921	1931	1948	1953	1961	1971	1981	1991	2001	2011
631	693	650	726	721	753	773	752	496	487	465	338	237	208	12	34

Napomena: It include data for the former settlement of Rujišta.

=== 1991 census ===
According to the 1991 census, settlement of Kom had 208 inhabitants, which were ethnically declared as this:

Kom
1991
total: 208
1. Serbs 202 (97.1%)
2. Croats 3 (1.44%)
3. Yugoslavs 2 (0.96%)
4. unknown 1 (0.48%)

=== Austro-hungarian 1910 census ===
According to the 1910 census, settlement of Kom had 753 inhabitants in 10 hamlets, which were linguistically and religiously declared as this:

Population by language	Croatian or Serbian
Brestovača	31
Ćukov Dol	23
Donje Rujište	140
Donji Javornik	36
Drvenjak	8
Gornje Rujište	86
Grabovača	51
Kom	323
Macurovac	32
Popovo Polje	23
Total	753 (100%)

Population by religion	Eastern Orthodox	Roman Catholics
Brestovača	31	-
Ćukov Dol	23	-
Donje Rujište	140	-
Donji Javornik	36	-
Drvenjak	-	8
Gornje Rujište	86	-
Grabovača	51	-
Kom	254	69
Macurovac	32	-
Popovo Polje	23	-
Total	676 (89.77%)	77 (10.22%)

== Literature ==
- Savezni zavod za statistiku i evidenciju FNRJ i SFRJ, popis stanovništva 1948, 1953, 1961, 1971, 1981. i 1991. godine.
- Knjiga: "Narodnosni i vjerski sastav stanovništva Hrvatske, 1880–1991: po naseljima, author: Jakov Gelo, izdavač: Državni zavod za statistiku Republike Hrvatske, 1998., ISBN 953-6667-07-X, ISBN 978-953-6667-07-9;
