= Zaklopac =

Zaklopac Заклопац (Serbian)
- Village
- Location within Croatia
- Coordinates: 44°25′38″N 16°04′46″E
- Country: Croatia
- County: Zadar County
- Municipality: Gračac

Area
  - Total: 12.2 km^{2} (4.7 sq mi)
- Elevation: 679 m (2,228 ft)

Population (2021)
  - Total: 12
  - Density: 0.98/km^{2} (2.5/sq mi)
- Time zone: UTC+1 (CET)
  - Summer (DST): UTC+2 (CEST)
- Postal code: 23445 Srb
- Area code: +385 (23)

Zaklopac (Serbian Cyrillic: Заклопац) is a village in Croatia.

== Population ==
According to the 2011 census, Zaklopac had 23 inhabitants.

Population
1857	1869	1880	1890	1900	1910	1921	1931	1948	1953	1961	1971	1981	1991	2001	2011
316	356	292	392	530	544	515	533	262	237	176	156	145	76	15	23

Note: From 1890-1948 it include data for the former settlements of Donji Zaklopac and Gornji Zaklopac.

=== 1991 census ===
According to the 1991 census, settlement of Zaklopac had 76 inhabitants, which were ethnically declared as all Serbs.

=== Austro-hungarian 1910 census ===
According to the 1910 census, settlement of Zaklopac had 544 inhabitants in 3 hamlets, which were linguistically and religiously declared as this:

Population by language	Croatian or Serbian
Brezovac Suvajski	70
Donji Zaklopac	133
Gornji Zaklopac	341
Total	544 (100%)

Population by religion	Eastern Orthodox
Brezovac Suvajski	70
Donji Zaklopac	133
Gornji Zaklopac	341
Total	544 (100%)

== Literature ==
- Savezni zavod za statistiku i evidenciju FNRJ i SFRJ, popis stanovništva 1948, 1953, 1961, 1971, 1981. i 1991. godine.
- Book: "Narodnosni i vjerski sastav stanovništva Hrvatske, 1880-1991: po naseljima, author: Jakov Gelo, izdavač: Državni zavod za statistiku Republike Hrvatske, 1998., ISBN 953-6667-07-X, ISBN 978-953-6667-07-9;
