= Tiškovac Lički =

Tiškovac Lički Тишковац Лички (Serbian)
- Village
- Location within Croatia
- Coordinates: 44°16′40″N 16°11′18″E
- Country: Croatia
- County: Zadar County
- Municipality: Gračac

Area
  - Total: 40.7 km^{2} (15.7 sq mi)
- Elevation: 569 m (1,867 ft)

Population (2021)
  - Total: 1
  - Density: 0.025/km^{2} (0.064/sq mi)
- Time zone: UTC+1 (CET)
  - Summer (DST): UTC+2 (CEST)
- Postal code: 23446 Kaldrma
- Area code: +385 (23)

Tiškovac Lički (Serbian Cyrillic: Тишковац Лички) is a village in Croatia.

== Population ==
According to the 2011 census, Tiškovac Lički had 15 inhabitants.

Population
1857	1869	1880	1890	1900	1910	1921	1931	1948	1953	1961	1971	1981	1991	2001	2011
242	320	266	347	365	399	422	449	561	328	266	212	149	114	17	15

Note: From 1857-1880 and from 1910-1948 name of the settlement was Tiškovac. In census years 1890 and 1900 it include data for the former settlement of Gornji Tiškovac. It also include data for the former settlement of Vagan Osredački.

=== 1991 census ===
According to the 1991 census, settlement of Tiškovac Lički had 114 inhabitants, which were ethnically declared as this:

Tiškovac Lički
1991
total: 114
1. Serbs 113 (99.1%)
2. unknown 1 (0.87%)

=== Austro-hungarian 1910 census ===
According to the 1910 census, settlement of Tiškovac Lički had 399 inhabitants in 3 hamlets, which were linguistically and religiously declared as this:

Population by language	Croatian or Serbian
Osredački Vagan	185
Osredačko Međugorje	25
Tiškovac	189
Total	399 (100%)

Population by religion	Eastern Orthodox	Roman Catholics
Osredački Vagan	185	-
Osredačko Međugorje	25	-
Tiškovac	183	6
Total	393 (98.49%)	6 (1.50%)

== Literature ==
- Savezni zavod za statistiku i evidenciju FNRJ i SFRJ, popis stanovništva 1948, 1953, 1961, 1971, 1981. i 1991. godine.
- Book: "Narodnosni i vjerski sastav stanovništva Hrvatske, 1880-1991: po naseljima, author: Jakov Gelo, izdavač: Državni zavod za statistiku Republike Hrvatske, 1998., ISBN 953-6667-07-X, ISBN 978-953-6667-07-9;
