= Dabašnica =

Dabašnica Дабашница (Serbian)
- Village
- Location within Croatia
- Coordinates: 44°21′56″N 16°02′18″E
- Country: Croatia
- County: Zadar County
- Municipality: Gračac

Area
  - Total: 32.9 km^{2} (12.7 sq mi)
- Elevation: 598 m (1,962 ft)

Population (2021)
  - Total: 1
  - Density: 0.030/km^{2} (0.079/sq mi)
- Time zone: UTC+1 (CET)
  - Summer (DST): UTC+2 (CEST)
- Postal code: 23445 Srb
- Area code: +385 (23)

Dabašnica (Serbian Cyrillic: Дабашница) is a village in Croatia.

== Population ==
According to the 2011 census, Dabašnica had 3 inhabitants.

Population
| 1857 | 1869 | 1880 | 1890 | 1900 | 1910 | 1921 | 1931 | 1948 | 1953 | 1961 | 1971 | 1981 | 1991 | 2001 | 2011 |
| 312 | 409 | 359 | 432 | 447 | 499 | 483 | 450 | 230 | 237 | 205 | 160 | 92 | 69 | 0 | 3 |

=== 1991 census ===
According to the 1991 census, settlement of Dabašnica had 69 inhabitants, which were ethnically declared as this:

Dabašnica
1991
total: 69
1. Serbs 68 (98.5%)
2. unknown 1 (1.44%)

=== Austro-hungarian 1910 census ===
According to the 1910 census, settlement of Dabašnica had 499 inhabitants in 3 hamlets, which were linguistically and religiously declared as this:

| Population by language | Croatian or Serbian |
|---|---|
| Dabašnica | 431 |
| Koraćuša | 32 |
| Orlova Greda | 36 |
| Total | 499 (100%) |

| Population by religion | Eastern Orthodox |
|---|---|
| Dabašnica | 431 |
| Koraćuša | 32 |
| Orlova Greda | 36 |
| Total | 499 (100%) |

== Literature ==
- Savezni zavod za statistiku i evidenciju FNRJ i SFRJ, popis stanovništva 1948, 1953, 1961, 1971, 1981. i 1991. godine.
- Knjiga: "Narodnosni i vjerski sastav stanovništva Hrvatske, 1880-1991: po naseljima, author: Jakov Gelo, izdavač: Državni zavod za statistiku Republike Hrvatske, 1998., ISBN 953-6667-07-X, ISBN 978-953-6667-07-9;
