= Donja Suvaja, Croatia =

Donja Suvaja Доња Суваја (Serbian)
- Village
- Location within Croatia
- Coordinates: 44°24′39″N 16°06′32″E
- Country: Croatia
- County: Zadar County
- Municipality: Gračac

Area
  - Total: 4.5 km^{2} (1.7 sq mi)
- Elevation: 391 m (1,283 ft)

Population (2021)
  - Total: 47
  - Density: 10/km^{2} (27/sq mi)
- Time zone: UTC+1 (CET)
  - Summer (DST): UTC+2 (CEST)
- Postal code: 23445 Srb
- Area code: +385 (23)

Donja Suvaja (Serbian Cyrillic: Доња Суваја) is a village in Croatia.

== Population ==
According to the 2011 census, Donja Suvaja had 53 inhabitants.

Population
1857	1869	1880	1890	1900	1910	1921	1931	1948	1953	1961	1971	1981	1991	2001	2011
995	1.187	842	558	529	685	511	455	362	340	184	163	161	153	48	53

Note: Settlements of Donja Suvaja and Gornja Suvaja are independent settlements from 1890. Before they were part of former settlement of Suvaja. It include data for that former settlement 1857-1880.

=== 1991 census ===
According to the 1991 census, settlement of Donja Suvaja had 153 inhabitants, which were ethnically declared as this:

Donja Suvaja
1991
total: 153
1. Serbs 152 (99.3%)
2. unknown 1 (0.65%)

=== Austro-hungarian 1910 census ===
According to the 1910 census, settlement of Donja Suvaja had 685 inhabitants in 3 hamlets, which were linguistically and religiously declared as this:

Population by language	Croatian or Serbian
Donja Suvaja	318
Mečet	105
Suvajsko Zalužje	262
Total	685 (100%)

Population by religion	Eastern Orthodox
Donja Suvaja	318
Mečet	105
Suvajsko Zalužje	262
Total	685 (100%)

== Literature ==
- Savezni zavod za statistiku i evidenciju FNRJ i SFRJ, popis stanovništva 1948, 1953, 1961, 1971, 1981. i 1991. godine.
- Knjiga: "Narodnosni i vjerski sastav stanovništva Hrvatske, 1880-1991: po naseljima, author: Jakov Gelo, izdavač: Državni zavod za statistiku Republike Hrvatske, 1998., ISBN 953-6667-07-X, ISBN 978-953-6667-07-9;
