= Bruvno =

Bruvno Брувно (Serbian)
- Village
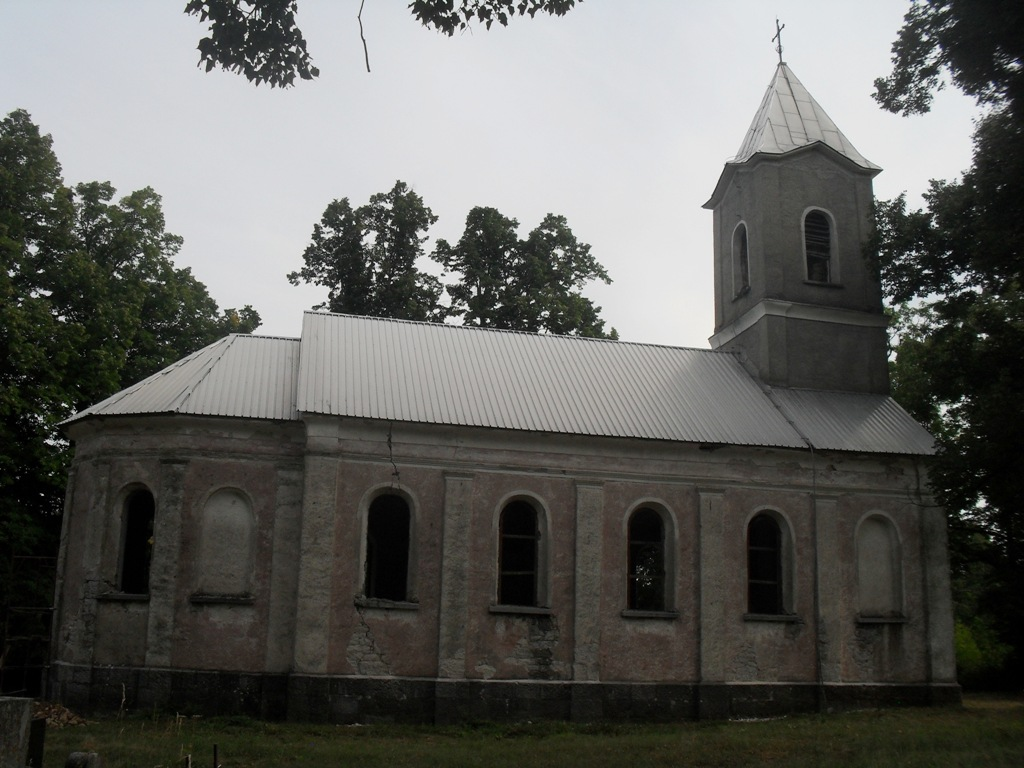
- Bruvno, serb orthodox church "St. John the Baptist"

- Location within Croatia
- Coordinates: 44°24′07″N 15°53′45″E
- Country: Croatia
- County: Zadar County
- Municipality: Gračac

Area
  - Total: 86.1 km^{2} (33.2 sq mi)
- Elevation: 750 m (2,460 ft)

Population (2021)
  - Total: 46
  - Density: 0.53/km^{2} (1.4/sq mi)
- Time zone: UTC+1 (CET)
  - Summer (DST): UTC+2 (CEST)
- Postal code: 23440 Gračac
- Area code: +385 (23)

Bruvno (Serbian Cyrillic: Брувно) is a village in Croatia.

== History ==
On 24 March 2022 at 14:35 the ŽVOC Zadar received a call about a wildfire in the area. 300 hectares (740 acres) burned by the time it was put out at 15:55 on the 26th by the IVP Zadar and VP Gračac.

== Population ==
According to the 2011 census, Bruvno had 92 inhabitants.

Population
1857	1869	1880	1890	1900	1910	1921	1931	1948	1953	1961	1971	1981	1991	2001	2011
2.350	1.343	1.137	1.266	1.414	1.379	1.421	1.347	834	836	818	610	432	292	55	92

Napomena: In 1857 include part of data for the settlement of Rudopolje Bruvanjsko.

=== 1991 census ===
According to the 1991 census, settlement of Bruvno had 292 inhabitants, which were ethnically declared as this:

Bruvno
1991
total: 292
1. Serbs 288 (98.6%)
2. nondeclared 1 (0.34%)
3. unknown 3 (1.02%)

=== Austro-hungarian 1910 census ===
According to the 1910 census, settlement of Bruvno had 1,379 inhabitants in 8 hamlets, which were linguistically and religiously declared as this:

Population by language	Croatian or Serbian
Bruvno	604
Grahovo	18
Krivošije	92
Krstače	71
Plećaši	137
Podurljaj	179
Potkremen	162
Potprevija	116
Total	1,379 (100%)

Population by religion	Eastern Orthodox	Roman Catholics
Bruvno	597	7
Grahovo	18	-
Krivošije	92	-
Krstače	71	-
Plećaši	137	-
Podurljaj	178	1
Potkremen	162	-
Potprevija	116	-
Total	1,371 (99.41%)	8 (0.58%)

=== 1712–14 census ===
The 1712–14 census of Lika and Krbava registered 658 inhabitants, all of whom were Serbian Orthodox.

== Literature ==
- Savezni zavod za statistiku i evidenciju FNRJ i SFRJ, popis stanovništva 1948, 1953, 1961, 1971, 1981. i 1991. godine.
- Knjiga: "Narodnosni i vjerski sastav stanovništva Hrvatske, 1880–1991: po naseljima, author: Jakov Gelo, izdavač: Državni zavod za statistiku Republike Hrvatske, 1998., ISBN 953-6667-07-X, ISBN 978-953-6667-07-9;
