= Gornja Suvaja, Croatia =

Gornja Suvaja Горња Суваја (Serbian)
- Village
- Location within Croatia
- Coordinates: 44°24′04″N 16°04′29″E
- Country: Croatia
- County: Zadar County
- Municipality: Gračac

Area
  - Total: 22.1 km^{2} (8.5 sq mi)
- Elevation: 603 m (1,978 ft)

Population (2021)
  - Total: 40
  - Density: 1.8/km^{2} (4.7/sq mi)
- Time zone: UTC+1 (CET)
  - Summer (DST): UTC+2 (CEST)
- Postal code: 23445 Srb
- Area code: +385 (23)

Gornja Suvaja (Serbian Cyrillic: Горња Суваја) is a village in Croatia.

== Population ==
According to the 2011 census, Gornja Suvaja had 36 inhabitants.

Population
1857	1869	1880	1890	1900	1910	1921	1931	1948	1953	1961	1971	1981	1991	2001	2011
0	0	0	428	466	574	472	456	357	329	333	261	257	250	20	36

Note: Settlements of Donja Suvaja and Gornja Suvaja are independent settlements from 1890. Before they were part of former settlement of Suvaja. Data for that former settlement 1857-1880 is included in settlement of Donja Suvaja .

=== 1991 census ===
According to the 1991 census, settlement of Gornja Suvaja had 250 inhabitants, which were ethnically declared as this:

Gornja Suvaja
1991
total: 250
1. Serbs 246 (98.4%)
2. Croats 1 (0.40%)
3. Yugoslavs 1 (0.40%)
4. unknown 2 (0.80%)

=== Austro-hungarian 1910 census ===
According to the 1910 census, settlement of Gornja Suvaja had 574 inhabitants in 4 hamlets, which were linguistically and religiously declared as this:

Population by language	Croatian or Serbian
Gornja Suvaja	222
Sanaderovac	226
Skadar	84
Šarampovište	42
Total	574 (100%)

Population by religion	Eastern Orthodox
Gornja Suvaja	222
Sanaderovac	226
Skadar	84
Šarampovište	42
Total	574 (100%)

== Literature ==
- Savezni zavod za statistiku i evidenciju FNRJ i SFRJ, popis stanovništva 1948, 1953, 1961, 1971, 1981. i 1991. godine.
- Knjiga: "Narodnosni i vjerski sastav stanovništva Hrvatske, 1880-1991: po naseljima, author: Jakov Gelo, izdavač: Državni zavod za statistiku Republike Hrvatske, 1998., ISBN 953-6667-07-X, ISBN 978-953-6667-07-9;
