= Kijani =

Kijani Кијани (Serbian)
- Village
- Interactive map of Kijani
- Location within Croatia
- Coordinates: 44°20′24″N 15°53′54″E
- Country: Croatia
- County: Zadar County
- Municipality: Gračac

Area
  - Total: 27.1 km^{2} (10.5 sq mi)
- Elevation: 628 m (2,060 ft)

Population (2021)
  - Total: 25
  - Density: 0.92/km^{2} (2.4/sq mi)
- Time zone: UTC+1 (CET)
  - Summer (DST): UTC+2 (CEST)
- Postal code: 23440 Gračac
- Area code: +385 (23)

Kijani (Serbian Cyrillic: Кијани) is a village in the Gračac municipality in Croatia.

== History ==
At least 14 Serb civilians were killed by the Croatian Army in the village during and in the aftermath of Operation Storm in August 1995.

== Population ==
According to the 2011 census, Kijani had 56 inhabitants.

Population
1857	1869	1880	1890	1900	1910	1921	1931	1948	1953	1961	1971	1981	1991	2001	2011
481	735	534	543	601	580	543	588	519	490	444	351	259	222	16	56

Napomena: In census period 1857–1880 it include data for the settlement of Gubavčevo Polje and part of data for the settlement of Glogovo.

=== 1991 census ===
According to the 1991 census, settlement of Kijani had 222 inhabitants, which were ethnically declared as this:

Kijani
1991
total: 222
1. Serbs 217 (97.7%)
2. Yugoslavs 1 (0.45%)
3. unknown 4 (1.80%)

=== Austro-hungarian 1910 census ===
According to the 1910 census, settlement of Kijani had 580 inhabitants, which were linguistically and religiously declared as this:

Population by language	Croatian or Serbian
Kijani	580
Total	580 (100%)

Population by religion	Eastern Orthodox	Roman Catholics
Kijani	570	10
Total	570 (98.27%)	10 (1.72%)

== Literature ==
- Savezni zavod za statistiku i evidenciju FNRJ i SFRJ, popis stanovništva 1948, 1953, 1961, 1971, 1981. i 1991. godine.
- Knjiga: "Narodnosni i vjerski sastav stanovništva Hrvatske, 1880–1991: po naseljima, author: Jakov Gelo, izdavač: Državni zavod za statistiku Republike Hrvatske, 1998., ISBN 953-6667-07-X, ISBN 978-953-6667-07-9;
