= Grab, Zadar County =

Grab Граб (Serbian)
- Village

- Location within Croatia
- Coordinates: 44°17′19″N 15°53′41″E
- Country: Croatia
- County: Zadar County
- Municipality: Gračac

Area
  - Total: 17.2 km^{2} (6.6 sq mi)
- Elevation: 555 m (1,821 ft)

Population (2021)
  - Total: 35
  - Density: 2.0/km^{2} (5.3/sq mi)
- Time zone: UTC+1 (CET)
  - Summer (DST): UTC+2 (CEST)
- Postal code: 23440 Gračac
- Area code: +385 (23)

Grab (Serbian Cyrillic: Граб) is a village in Croatia.

== Population ==
According to the 2011 census, Grab had 78 inhabitants.

Population
1857	1869	1880	1890	1900	1910	1921	1931	1948	1953	1961	1971	1981	1991	2001	2011
680	774	698	721	730	721	717	778	486	493	412	341	239	219	61	78

Napomena: In census period 1857–1880 it include data for the settlement of Vučipolje.

=== 1991 census ===
According to the 1991 census, settlement of Grab had 219 inhabitants, which were ethnically declared as this:

Grab
1991
total: 219
1. Serbs 217 (99.1%)
2. Croats 1 (0.45%)
3. Yugoslavs 1 (0.45%)

=== Austro-hungarian 1910 census ===
According to the 1910 census, settlement of Grab had 721 inhabitants in 2 hamlets, which were linguistically and religiously declared as this:

Population by language	Croatian or Serbian
Grab	651
Malo Glogovo	70
Total	721 (100%)

Population by religion	Eastern Orthodox	Roman Catholics
Grab	559	92
Malo Glogovo	70	-
Total	629 (87.23%)	92 (12.76%)

== Literature ==
- Savezni zavod za statistiku i evidenciju FNRJ i SFRJ, popis stanovništva 1948, 1953, 1961, 1971, 1981. i 1991. godine.
- Knjiga: "Narodnosni i vjerski sastav stanovništva Hrvatske, 1880–1991: po naseljima, author: Jakov Gelo, izdavač: Državni zavod za statistiku Republike Hrvatske, 1998., ISBN 953-6667-07-X, ISBN 978-953-6667-07-9;
