= Kopčevec =

- Settlement
- Location within Croatia
- Country: Croatia
- County: Zagreb
- Town: Dugo Selo

Area
  - Total: 4.6 km^{2} (1.8 sq mi)

Population (2021)
  - Total: 1,060
  - Density: 230/km^{2} (600/sq mi)
- Time zone: UTC+1 (CET)
  - Summer (DST): UTC+2 (CEST)

Kopčevec is a settlement in the Dugo Selo town of Zagreb County, Croatia. As of 2011 it had a population of 1,093 people.
