= Osredci, Croatia =

Osredci Осредци (Serbian)
- Village
- Location within Croatia
- Coordinates: 44°21′06″N 16°09′54″E
- Country: Croatia
- County: Zadar County
- Municipality: Gračac

Area
  - Total: 16.5 km^{2} (6.4 sq mi)
- Elevation: 653 m (2,142 ft)

Population (2021)
  - Total: 32
  - Density: 1.9/km^{2} (5.0/sq mi)
- Time zone: UTC+1 (CET)
  - Summer (DST): UTC+2 (CEST)
- Postal code: 23446 Kaldrma
- Area code: +385 (23)

Osredci (Serbian Cyrillic: Осредци) is a village in Croatia.

== Population ==
According to the 2011 census, Osredci had 42 inhabitants.

Population
1857	1869	1880	1890	1900	1910	1921	1931	1948	1953	1961	1971	1981	1991	2001	2011
482	568	539	669	725	779	801	715	365	388	319	269	231	190	38	42

Note: Till 1900 name of the settlement was Osredke.

=== 1991 census ===
According to the 1991 census, Osredci had 190 inhabitants, which were ethnically declared as this:

Osredci
1991
total: 190
1. Serbs 190 (100.0%)

=== Austro-Hungarian 1910 census ===
According to the 1910 census, Osredci had 779 inhabitants, which were linguistically and religiously declared as this:

Population by language	Croatian or Serbian
Osredci	779
Total	779 (100%)

Population by religion	Eastern Orthodox
Osredci	779
Total	779 (100%)

== Literature ==
- Savezni zavod za statistiku i evidenciju FNRJ i SFRJ, popis stanovništva 1948, 1953, 1961, 1971, 1981. i 1991. godine.
- Book: "Narodnosni i vjerski sastav stanovništva Hrvatske, 1880-1991: po naseljima, author: Jakov Gelo, izdavač: Državni zavod za statistiku Republike Hrvatske, 1998., ISBN 953-6667-07-X, ISBN 978-953-6667-07-9;
