= Vučipolje, Zadar County =

Vučipolje Вучипоље (Serbian)
- Village
- Location within Croatia
- Coordinates: 44°16′23″N 15°55′42″E
- Country: Croatia
- County: Zadar County
- Municipality: Gračac

Area
  - Total: 28.9 km^{2} (11.2 sq mi)
- Elevation: 614 m (2,014 ft)

Population (2021)
  - Total: 1
  - Density: 0.035/km^{2} (0.090/sq mi)
- Time zone: UTC+1 (CET)
  - Summer (DST): UTC+2 (CEST)
- Postal code: 23440 Gračac
- Area code: +385 (23)

Vučipolje (Serbian Cyrillic: Вучипоље) is a village in Croatia. It is connected by the D1 road.

== Population ==
According to the 2011 census, Vučipolje had 1 inhabitant.

Population
1857	1869	1880	1890	1900	1910	1921	1931	1948	1953	1961	1971	1981	1991	2001	2011
0	0	0	274	315	387	440	584	347	315	272	173	135	66	0	1

Note: In census period 1857–1880 data is include in the settlement of Grab.

=== 1991 census ===
According to the 1991 census, settlement of Vučipolje had 66 inhabitants, which were ethnically declared as this:

Vučipolje
1991
total: 66
1. Serbs 64 (97.0%)
2. unknown 2 (3.03%)

=== Austro-Hungarian 1910 census ===
According to the 1910 census, settlement of Vučipolje had 387 inhabitants in 5 hamlets, which were linguistically and religiously declared as this:

Population by language	Croatian or Serbian
Cerovci	118
Gaćešin Dol	19
Gusarica	21
Radusinova Draga	55
Vučipolje	174
Total	387 (100%)

Population by religion	Eastern Orthodox	Roman Catholics
Cerovci	51	67
Gaćešin Dol	19	-
Gusarica	7	14
Radusinova Draga	55	-
Vučipolje	132	42
Total	264 (68.21%)	123 (31.78%)

== Literature ==
- Savezni zavod za statistiku i evidenciju FNRJ i SFRJ, popis stanovništva 1948, 1953, 1961, 1971, 1981. i 1991. godine.
- Knjiga: "Narodnosni i vjerski sastav stanovništva Hrvatske, 1880–1991: po naseljima, author: Jakov Gelo, izdavač: Državni zavod za statistiku Republike Hrvatske, 1998., ISBN 953-6667-07-X, ISBN 978-953-6667-07-9;
