= Kupirovo =

Kupirovo Купирово (Serbian)
- Village
- Location within Croatia
- Coordinates: 44°19′13″N 16°06′29″E
- Country: Croatia
- County: Zadar County
- Municipality: Gračac

Area
  - Total: 26.3 km^{2} (10.2 sq mi)
- Elevation: 510 m (1,670 ft)

Population (2021)
  - Total: 28
  - Density: 1.1/km^{2} (2.8/sq mi)
- Time zone: UTC+1 (CET)
  - Summer (DST): UTC+2 (CEST)
- Postal code: 23445 Srb
- Area code: +385 (23)

Kupirovo (Serbian Cyrillic: Купирово) is a village in Croatia. It is connected by the D218 highway.

== Population ==
According to the 2011 census, Kupirovo had 46 inhabitants.

Population
1857	1869	1880	1890	1900	1910	1921	1931	1948	1953	1961	1971	1981	1991	2001	2011
865	1.066	845	399	495	469	436	399	258	245	220	184	160	130	16	46

Note: In census years 1857-1880 it include data for the settlement of Kunovac Kupirovački.

=== 1991 census ===
According to the 1991 census, settlement of Kupirovo had 130 inhabitants, which were ethnically declared as this:

Kupirovo
1991
total: 130
1. Serbs 130 (100.0%)

=== Austro-hungarian 1910 census ===
According to the 1910 census, settlement of Kupirovo had 469 inhabitants in 2 hamlets, which were linguistically and religiously declared as this:

Population by language	Croatian or Serbian
Kupirovo	273
Šijanov Kraj	196
Total	469 (100%)

Population by religion	Eastern Orthodox	Roman Catholics
Kupirovo	272	1
Šijanov Kraj	196	-
Total	468 (99.78%)	1 (0.21%)

== Literature ==
- Savezni zavod za statistiku i evidenciju FNRJ i SFRJ, popis stanovništva 1948, 1953, 1961, 1971, 1981. i 1991. godine.
- Book: "Narodnosni i vjerski sastav stanovništva Hrvatske, 1880-1991: po naseljima, author: Jakov Gelo, izdavač: Državni zavod za statistiku Republike Hrvatske, 1998., ISBN 953-6667-07-X, ISBN 978-953-6667-07-9;
