= Mala Ostrna =

Coordinates: 45°47′N 16°18′E

- Settlement
- Location within Croatia
- Country: Croatia
- County: Zagreb
- Town: Dugo Selo

Area
  - Total: 3.1 km^{2} (1.2 sq mi)

Population (2021)
  - Total: 238
  - Density: 77/km^{2} (200/sq mi)
- Time zone: UTC+1 (CET)
  - Summer (DST): UTC+2 (CEST)

Mala Ostrna is a settlement in the Dugo Selo town of Zagreb County, Croatia. As of 2011 it had a population of 325 people.
