= Prozorje =

- Settlement
- Location within Croatia
- Country: Croatia
- County: Zagreb
- Town: Dugo Selo

Area
  - Total: 5.6 km^{2} (2.2 sq mi)

Population (2021)
  - Total: 433
  - Density: 77/km^{2} (200/sq mi)
- Time zone: UTC+1 (CET)
  - Summer (DST): UTC+2 (CEST)

Prozorje is a settlement in the Dugo Selo town of Zagreb County, Croatia. As of 2011 it had a population of 521 people.
