= Neteka =

Neteka Нетека (Serbian)
- Village
- Location within Croatia
- Coordinates: 44°22′52″N 16°07′07″E
- Country: Croatia
- County: Zadar County
- Municipality: Gračac

Area
  - Total: 15.8 km^{2} (6.1 sq mi)
- Elevation: 404 m (1,325 ft)

Population (2021)
  - Total: 75
  - Density: 4.7/km^{2} (12/sq mi)
- Time zone: UTC+1 (CET)
  - Summer (DST): UTC+2 (CEST)
- Postal code: 23445 Srb
- Area code: +385 (23)

Neteka (Serbian Cyrillic: Нетека) is a village in Croatia. It is connected by the D218 highway.

== Population ==
According to the 2011 census, Neteka had 87 inhabitants.

Population
1857	1869	1880	1890	1900	1910	1921	1931	1948	1953	1961	1971	1981	1991	2001	2011
294	413	381	309	381	388	391	352	240	250	247	231	206	237	57	87

=== 1991 census ===
According to the 1991 census, settlement of Neteka had 237 inhabitants, which were ethnically declared as this:

Neteka
1991
total: 237
1. Serbs 235 (99.2%)
2. Croats 1 (0.42%)
3. Yugoslavs 1 (0.42%)

=== Austro-hungarian 1910 census ===
According to the 1910 census, settlement of Neteka had 388 inhabitants, which were linguistically and religiously declared as this:

Population by language	Croatian or Serbian
Neteka	388
Total	388 (100%)

Population by religion	Eastern Orthodox
Neteka	388
Total	388 (100%)

== Literature ==
- Savezni zavod za statistiku i evidenciju FNRJ i SFRJ, popis stanovništva 1948, 1953, 1961, 1971, 1981. i 1991. godine.
- Book: "Narodnosni i vjerski sastav stanovništva Hrvatske, 1880-1991: po naseljima, author: Jakov Gelo, izdavač: Državni zavod za statistiku Republike Hrvatske, 1998., ISBN 953-6667-07-X, ISBN 978-953-6667-07-9;
