= Gračac =

Gračac Грачац (Serbian)
- Municipality
- Municipality of Gračac; Općina Gračac; Општина Грачац
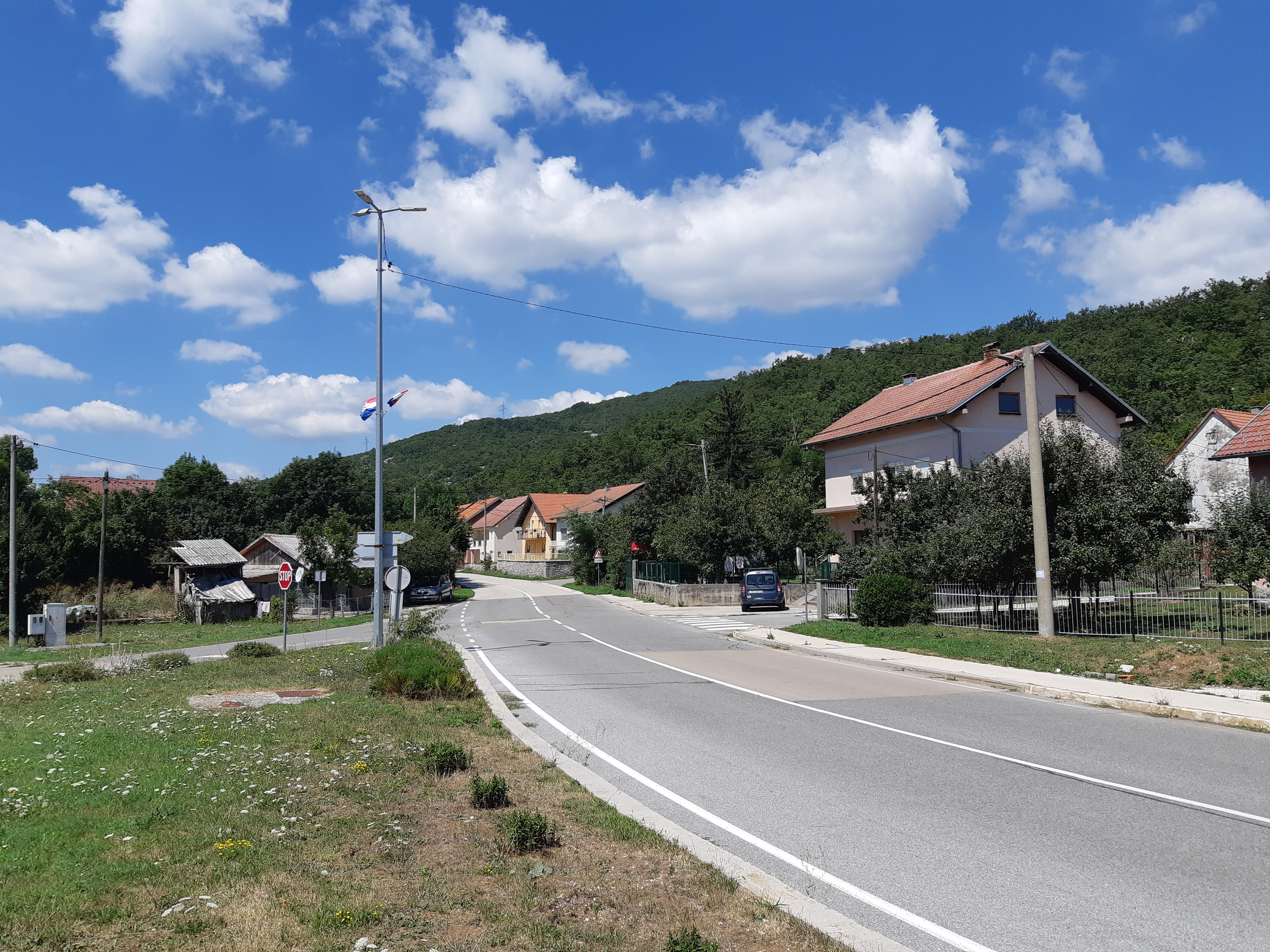
- A street in Gračac
- Interactive map of Gračac
- Location within Croatia
- Coordinates: 44.299°N 15.847°E
- Country: Croatia
- Region: Dalmatia
- County: Zadar County

Government
  - Municipal mayor: Goran Đekić (SDSS)

Area
  - Municipality: 958.3 km^{2} (370.0 sq mi)
  - Urban: 69.9 km^{2} (27.0 sq mi)

Population (2021)
  - Municipality: 3,136
  - Density: 3.272/km^{2} (8.476/sq mi)
  - Urban: 2,060
  - Urban density: 29.5/km^{2} (76.3/sq mi)
- Postal code: 23 440
- Area code: +385(0)23
- Vehicle registration: ZD
- Website: gracac.hr

Gračac (pronounced [grǎtʃats];) is a municipality in the southern part of Lika, Croatia. The municipality is administratively part of Zadar County.

Gračac is located south of Udbina, northeast of Obrovac, northwest of Knin and southeast of Gospić.

== Climate ==
Since records began in 1960, the highest temperature recorded at the local weather station was 39.6 °C (103.3 °F), on 2 August 2017. The coldest temperature was −34.6 °C (−30.3 °F), on 13 January 2003.

== History ==
Gračac was ruled by the Ottoman Empire between 1527 and 1687 (nominally to 1699) as part of the Sanjak of Lika in the Bosnia Eyalet before Austrian conquest. The 1712–14 census of Lika and Krbava registered 1,711 inhabitants, out of whom 1,655 were Vlachs, 53 were Catholic Bunjevci and 3 were Catholic Croats. The term "Vlach" was used at the time to describe a population of Eastern Orthodox religion and rarely as an ethnic group. Those families that moved to Gračac came from area south east of Belgrade.

On 20 December 1865, judge Josifović of the Otočac court caused a scandal by sentencing 70 year old Gračac parish priest Jovan Radošević to 6 months imprisonment for failure to pay the interest on a 22 franc loan by the year's end. Radošević's opponents replaced him with priest Đuro Alaga.

From 1991 to 1995, Gračac was part of the self-proclaimed Republic of Serbian Krajina. In August of 1995, the town was taken over by Croatian forces during Operation Storm. At least 14 Serb civilians were killed by the Croatian Army in the nearby Kijani village during and in the aftermath of Operation Storm in August 1995.

The area of Gračac was not part of the Austro-Hungarian crown land of Dalmatia, but it is often perceived as part of Dalmatia in the modern sense because of its inclusion in Zadar County.

== Demographics ==
Historical population
Year	Pop.	±%
1857	19,099	—
1869	22,570	+18.2%
1880	19,388	−14.1%
1890	22,152	+14.3%
1900	24,607	+11.1%
1910	25,192	+2.4%
1921	25,437	+1.0%
1931	25,214	−0.9%
1948	17,946	−28.8%
1953	17,706	−1.3%
1961	16,670	−5.9%
1971	14,377	−13.8%
1981	12,151	−15.5%
1991	11,167	−8.1%
2001	3,923	−64.9%
2011	4,690	+19.6%
2021	3,136	−33.1%
Source: Naselja i stanovništvo Republike Hrvatske 1857–2021, DZS

In 2021, the municipality had 3,136 residents in the following 39 settlements:

- Begluci, population 59
- Brotnja, population 22
- Bruvno, population 46
- Cerovac, population 2
- Dabašnica, population 1
- Deringaj, population 68
- Donja Suvaja, population 47
- Drenovac Osredački, population 8
- Duboki Dol, population 0
- Dugopolje, population 17
- Glogovo, population 3
- Gornja Suvaja, population 40
- Grab, population 35
- Gračac, population 2060
- Gubavčevo Polje, population 2
- Kaldrma, population 20
- Kijani, population 25
- Kom, population 22
- Kunovac Kupirovački, population 29
- Kupirovo, population 28
- Mazin, population 27
- Nadvrelo, population 0
- Neteka, population 75
- Omsica, population 4
- Osredci, population 32
- Otrić, population 17
- Palanka, population 11
- Pribudić, population 2
- Prljevo, population 4
- Rastičevo, population 2
- Rudopolje Bruvanjsko, population 30
- Srb, population 301
- Tiškovac Lički, population 1
- Tomingaj, population 21
- Velika Popina, population 42
- Vučipolje, population 1
- Zaklopac, population 12
- Zrmanja, population 9
- Zrmanja Vrelo, population 11
Gračac: Population trends 1857–2021
v

population	19099	22570	19388	22152	24607	25192	25437	25214	17946	17706	16670	14377	12151	11167	3923	4690	3136
	1857	1869	1880	1890	1900	1910	1921	1931	1948	1953	1961	1971	1981	1991	2001	2011	2021

Sources: Croatian Bureau of Statistics publications

Population by ethnicity
Year of census	total	Croats	Serbs	Others
1961	17,586	3,736 (21.24%)	13,670 (77.73%)	180 (1.02%)
1971	14,819	3,107 (20.97%)	11,318 (76.37%)	394 (2.66%)
1981	11,863	2,150 (18.12%)	8,578 (72.31%)	1,135 (9.57%)
1991	10,434	1,697 (16.26%)	8,371 (80.22%)	366 (3.51%)
2001	3,923	2,260 (57.61%)	1,523 (38.82%)	140 (3.57%)
2011	4,690	2,528 (53.90%)	2,118 (45.16%)	44 (0.94%)

Note: in some censuses, such as in 1981, parts of the population listed themselves as Yugoslavs instead of Croat or Serb.

== Politics ==
=== Minority councils and representatives ===
Serbian and Croatian are co-official at the municipal level in Gračac. As of 2023, most of the legal requirements for the fulfillment of bilingual standards have not been carried out. Cyrillic is not used official building signage, street signs, traffic signs or seals. Within official documents, it is only occasionally used on certain forms. There are no public legal and administrative employees proficient in the script.

Directly elected minority councils and representatives are tasked with consulting tasks for the local or regional authorities in which they are advocating for minority rights and interests, integration into public life and participation in the management of local affairs. At the 2023 Croatian national minorities councils and representatives elections Serbs of Croatia fulfilled legal requirements to elect 10 members minority councils of the Municipality of Gračac.

== Attractions ==
The name Gračac is derived from "gradina" which means an old abandoned castle. Near the town there are Lake Štikada and the karst field of Gračac. The Cerovac caves nearby are open for tourists. The town is on the way into the Lika region of Zadar county, and the surroundings offer good hunting game.

== Sports ==
The local HPS chapter was called HPD "Crnopac". It was liquidated on 20 January 1939.

== Notable people ==
- Ilija Ivezić
- Nikolaj Mandić
- Danilo Stanisavljević
- John David Brcin
- Petar Škundrić
- Slavica Knežević
