= Dugopolje, Zadar County =

Dugopolje Дугопоље (Serbian) Ličko Dugopolje
- Village
- Location within Croatia
- Coordinates: 44°20′07″N 16°11′59″E
- Country: Croatia
- County: Zadar County
- Municipality: Gračac

Area
  - Total: 6.7 km^{2} (2.6 sq mi)
- Elevation: 648 m (2,126 ft)

Population (2021)
  - Total: 17
  - Density: 2.5/km^{2} (6.6/sq mi)
- Time zone: UTC+1 (CET)
  - Summer (DST): UTC+2 (CEST)
- Postal code: 23446 Kaldrma
- Area code: +385 (23)

Dugopolje (Serbian Cyrillic: Дугопоље) is a village in Croatia.

== Population ==
According to the 2011 census, Dugopolje had 20 inhabitants.

Population
1857	1869	1880	1890	1900	1910	1921	1931	1948	1953	1961	1971	1981	1991	2001	2011
194	195	165	164	171	233	206	186	117	120	83	93	72	68	8	20

=== 1991 census ===
According to the 1991 census, settlement of Dugopolje had 68 inhabitants, which were ethnically declared as this:

Dugopolje
1991
total: 68
1. Serbs 68 (100.0%)

=== Austro-hungarian 1910 census ===
According to the 1910 census, settlement of Dugopolje had 233 inhabitants which were linguistically and religiously declared as this:

Population by language	Croatian or Serbian
Dugopolje	233
Total	233 (100%)

Population by religion	Eastern Orthodox
Dugopolje	233
Total	233 (100%)

== Literature ==
- Savezni zavod za statistiku i evidenciju FNRJ i SFRJ, popis stanovništva 1948, 1953, 1961, 1971, 1981. i 1991. godine.
- Knjiga: "Narodnosni i vjerski sastav stanovništva Hrvatske, 1880-1991: po naseljima, author: Jakov Gelo, izdavač: Državni zavod za statistiku Republike Hrvatske, 1998., ISBN 953-6667-07-X, ISBN 978-953-6667-07-9;
