= Liska, Croatia =

Settlement in Split-Dalmatia County, Croatia

Liska
- Settlement
- Interactive map of Liska
- Location of Liska in Croatia
- Coordinates: 43°35′02″N 16°39′51″E
- Country: Croatia
- County: Split-Dalmatia
- Municipality: Dugopolje

Area
  - Total: 4.1 km^{2} (1.6 sq mi)

Population (2021)
  - Total: 54
  - Density: 13/km^{2} (34/sq mi)
- Time zone: UTC+1 (CET)
  - Summer (DST): UTC+2 (CEST)
- Postal code: 21204 Dugopolje
- Area code: +385 (0)21

Liska is a settlement in the Municipality of Dugopolje in Croatia. In 2021, its population was 54.

== Demographics ==
Liska: Population trends 1857–2021
v

population			53	65	106	130			121	128	139	139	119	79	64	56	54
	1857	1869	1880	1890	1900	1910	1921	1931	1948	1953	1961	1971	1981	1991	2001	2011	2021

Sources: Croatian Bureau of Statistics publications
