= Begluci, Croatia =

Begluci Беглуци (Serbian)
- Village
- Location within Croatia
- Coordinates: 44°24′33″N 16°07′44″E
- Country: Croatia
- County: Zadar County
- Municipality: Gračac

Area
  - Total: 9.7 km^{2} (3.7 sq mi)
- Elevation: 414 m (1,358 ft)

Population (2021)
  - Total: 59
  - Density: 6.1/km^{2} (16/sq mi)
- Time zone: UTC+1 (CET)
  - Summer (DST): UTC+2 (CEST)
- Postal code: 23445 Srb
- Area code: +385 (23)

Begluci (Serbian Cyrillic: Беглуци) is a village in Croatia.

== Population ==
According to the 2011 census, Begluci had 61 inhabitants.

Population
| 1857 | 1869 | 1880 | 1890 | 1900 | 1910 | 1921 | 1931 | 1948 | 1953 | 1961 | 1971 | 1981 | 1991 | 2001 | 2011 |
| 213 | 256 | 239 | 293 | 356 | 441 | 484 | 561 | 506 | 484 | 415 | 362 | 332 | 235 | 51 | 61 |

Note: In 1857 and 1869 this settlement was part of Bosnia and Herzegovina (that time Ottoman Empire), without census data, so population number is calculated. 1880, 1890 and 1900 data are taken from Bosnia and Herzegovina censuses (under occupation control of Austria-Hungary) from 1879, 1885 and 1895. The settlement of Begluci became part of the Yugoslav federal unit of Croatia after World War II.

=== 1991 census ===
According to the 1991 census, settlement of Begluci had 235 inhabitants, which were ethnically declared as:

Begluci
1991
total: 235
1. Serbs 234 (99.6%)
2. unknown 1 (0.42%)

=== Austro-hungarian 1910 census ===
According to the 1910 census, settlement of Begluci had 441 inhabitants, which were linguistically and religiously declared as this:

| Population by language | Croatian or Serbian |
|---|---|
| Begluci | 441 |
| Total | 441 (100%) |

| Population by religion | Eastern Orthodox |
|---|---|
| Begluci | 441 |
| Total | 441 (100%) |

Note: In 1910 census settlement of Begluci was in Bosnia and Herzegovina.

== Literature ==
- Savezni zavod za statistiku i evidenciju FNRJ i SFRJ, popis stanovništva 1948, 1953, 1961, 1971, 1981. i 1991. godine.
- Knjiga: "Narodnosni i vjerski sastav stanovništva Hrvatske, 1880-1991: po naseljima, author: Jakov Gelo, izdavač: Državni zavod za statistiku Republike Hrvatske, 1998., ISBN 953-6667-07-X, ISBN 978-953-6667-07-9;
