= Puhovo, Croatia =

Coordinates: 45°47′N 16°15′E

- Settlement
- Location within Croatia
- Country: Croatia
- County: Zagreb
- Town: Dugo Selo

Population (2011)
  - Total: 710
- Time zone: UTC+1 (CET)
  - Summer (DST): UTC+2 (CEST)

Puhovo, Croatia is a settlement in the Dugo Selo town of Zagreb County, Croatia. As of 2011 it had a population of 710 people.
