= Dugo Selo =

- Town
- Grad Dugo Selo; Town of Dugo Selo
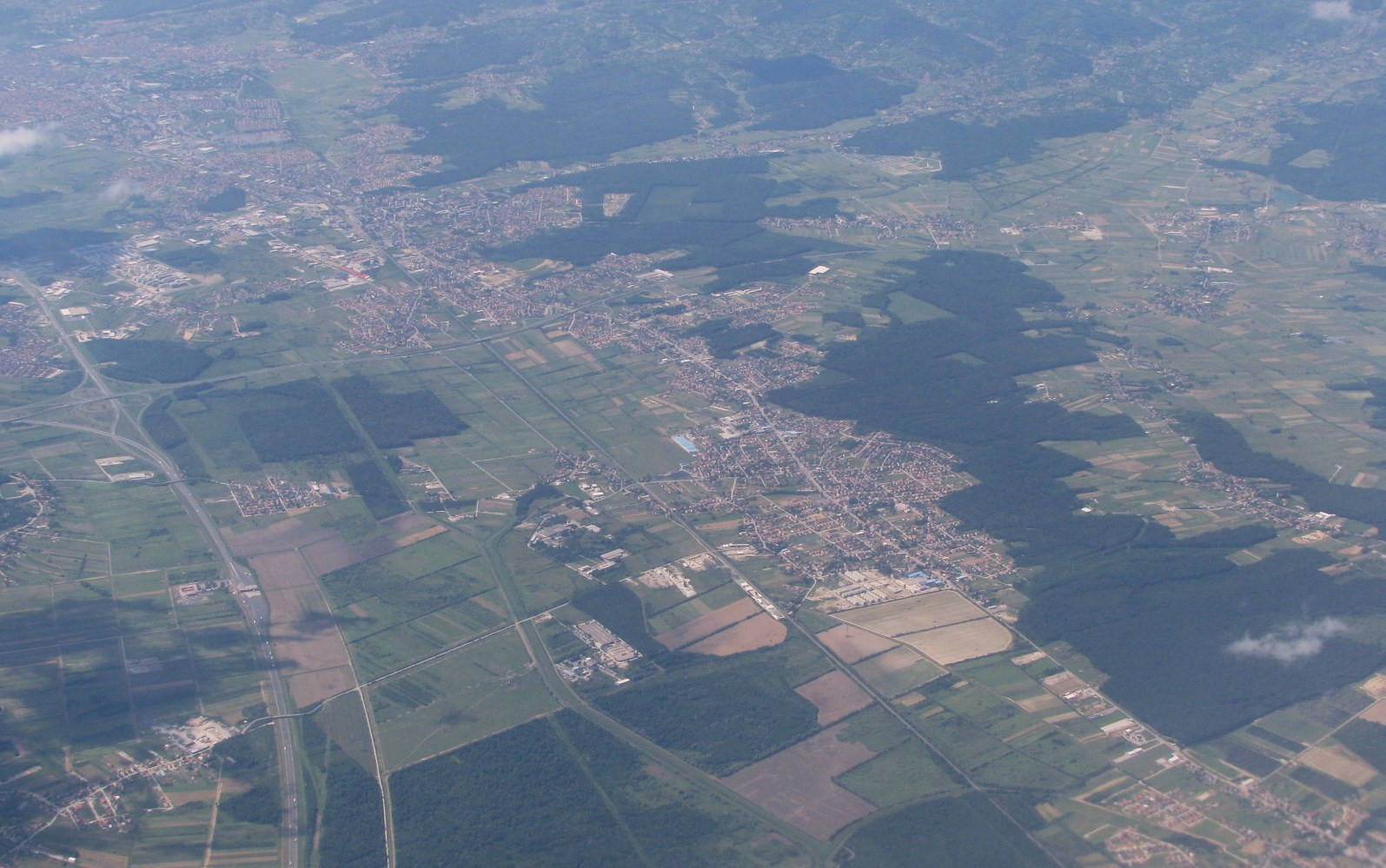
- Dugo Selo town center
- Interactive map of Dugo Selo
- Location of Dugo Selo in Croatia
- Coordinates: 45°48′21″N 16°13′59″E
- Country: Croatia
- Region: Central Croatia (Prigorje, Posavina)
- County: Zagreb County

Government
  - Mayor: Nenad Panian (Fokus)

Area
  - Town: 54.3 km^{2} (21.0 sq mi)
  - Urban: 12.4 km^{2} (4.8 sq mi)

Population (2021)
  - Town: 17,676
  - Density: 326/km^{2} (843/sq mi)
  - Urban: 11,097
  - Urban density: 895/km^{2} (2,320/sq mi)
- Time zone: UTC+1 (CET)
  - Summer (DST): UTC+2 (CEST)
- Postal codes: HR-10 370
- Area code: +385 1
- Vehicle registration: ZG
- Website: dugoselo.hr

Dugo Selo is a town with 17,676 inhabitants in Zagreb County, Croatia.

== Geography ==
Dugo Selo (lit. Long Village) is a 20 km drive from Zagreb city centre.

The town covers an area of 51 km² and it consists of numerous settlements. The summit of the hill Martin Breg is situated in the northern part of the town. Most neighborhoods of Dugo Selo are located on the Martin Breg slopes.

Dugo Selo is usually considered an exurb of Zagreb. It is also a part of Zagreb metropolitan area.

=== Transportation ===
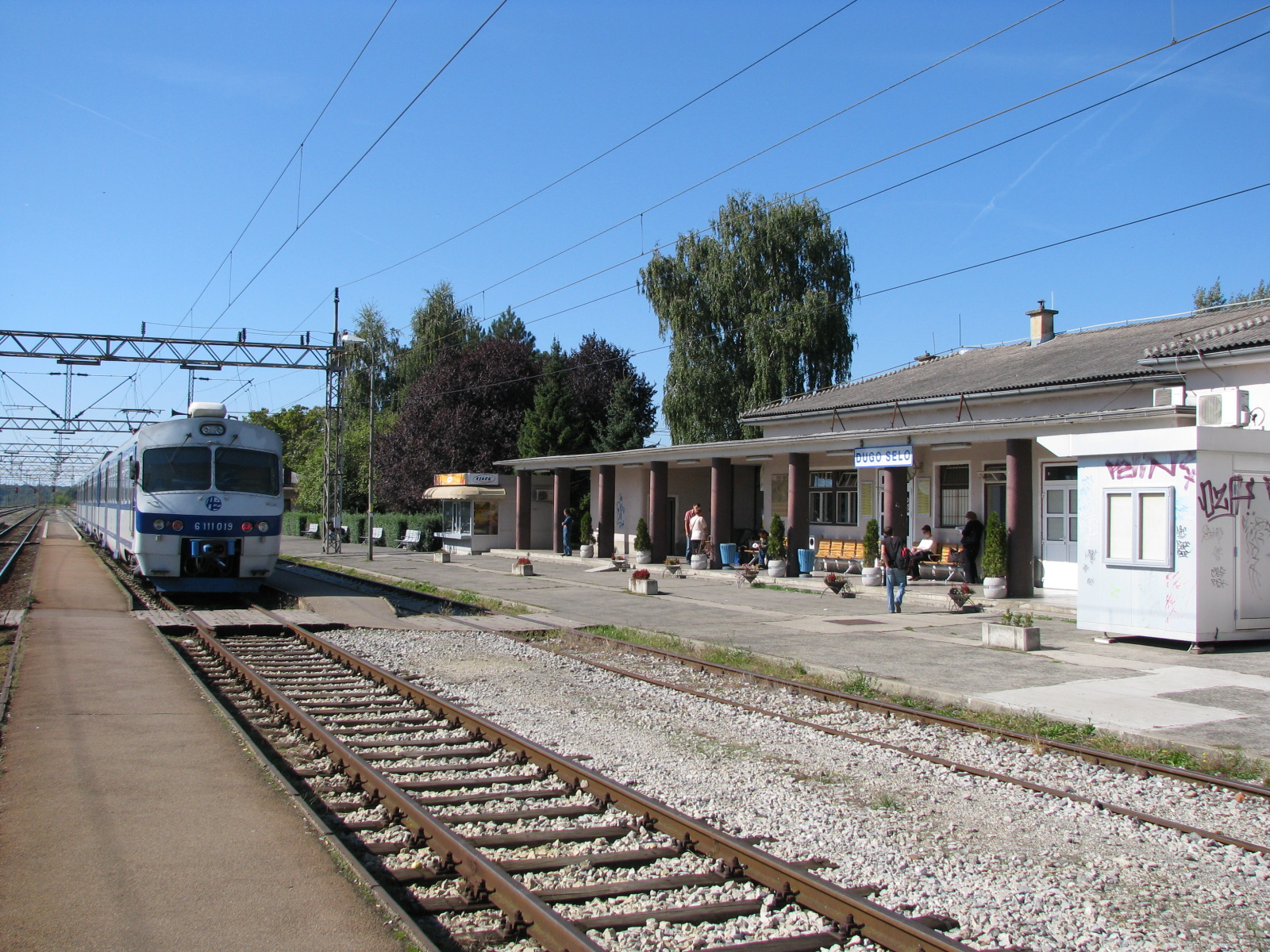
Railway station

The railway lines from Zagreb, to Koprivnica and to Novska connect to each other at a major railway station, which is located in the southern part of town. All three lines are part of Pan-European Corridors Vb and X respectively.

The main thoroughfare of Dugo Selo is Ž3034 county road (Zagreb-Križevci), an east–west heavily travelled two-lane road. Because of the proximity, a substantial amount of inhabitants commute to Zagreb, thereby creating congestion during peak hours. The congestion on the Dugo Selo's part of the route is mild. The Ž3034 used to be classified as D41 state road before the D10 expressway was built.

== Demographics ==
Historical population
Year	Pop.	±%
1857	2,094	—
1869	2,271	+8.5%
1880	2,423	+6.7%
1890	3,060	+26.3%
1900	3,694	+20.7%
1910	4,294	+16.2%
1921	4,055	−5.6%
1931	4,220	+4.1%
1948	4,088	−3.1%
1953	4,296	+5.1%
1961	5,096	+18.6%
1971	6,219	+22.0%
1981	8,192	+31.7%
1991	9,969	+21.7%
2001	14,300	+43.4%
2011	17,466	+22.1%
2021	17,676	+1.2%
Source: Naselja i stanovništvo Republike Hrvatske 1857–2021, DZS

In the 2011 census, the Town of Dugo Selo has a total population of 17,466, in the following settlements:

- Andrilovec, population 286
- Donje Dvorišće, population 188
- Dugo Selo, population 10,453
- Kopčevec, population 1,093
- Kozinščak, population 1,345
- Leprovica, population 254
- Lukarišće, population 1,020
- Mala Ostrna, population 325
- Prozorje, population 521
- Puhovo, population 710
- Velika Ostrna, population 1,271
Town of Dugo Selo: Population trends 1857–2021
v

population	2094	2271	2423	3060	3694	4294	4055	4220	4088	4296	5096	6219	8192	9969	14300	17466	17676
	1857	1869	1880	1890	1900	1910	1921	1931	1948	1953	1961	1971	1981	1991	2001	2011	2021

Sources: Croatian Bureau of Statistics publications

== Administration ==
Town government, court, police, health-service, post office are the part of infrastructure of Dugo Selo.

Dugo Selo has a misdemeanor court, a municipal court, a police station, a hospital and a post office.

Its post code is 10370.

== History ==
In the late 19th and early 20th century, Dugo Selo was a district capital in the Zagreb County of the Kingdom of Croatia-Slavonia.

== Economy ==
Ever since the beginning of the 20th century main occupation of this region has been agriculture. Today in addition to land cultivation people also grow wine and fruit on the slopes of Martin Breg. The very beginning of the century also saw the development of industrial and trade activities. At that time brick-making and wood-processing facilities were first built, followed by bake-house and metal processing plant. The class of tradesmen and merchants emerged and these activities – trade, services and hospitality industry – remain the most important to this day. Making of bread, cakes and pastries ("Mipel") is the most outstanding, together with individual agricultural production.

== Monuments and sightseeings ==
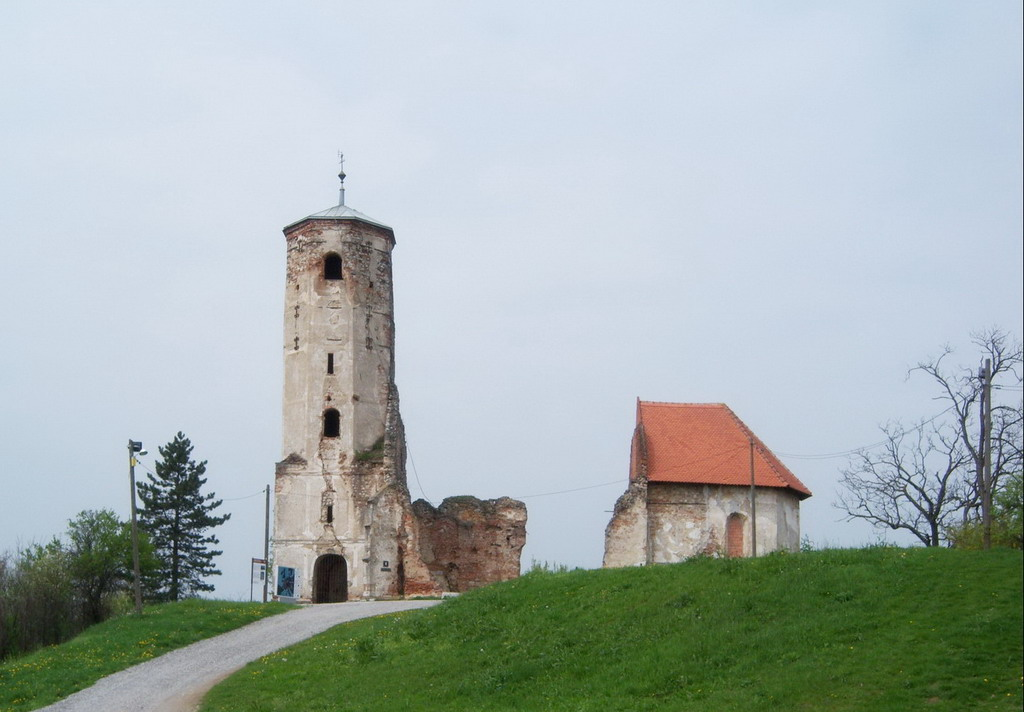
Old church on Martin Breg

There are many scenic spots in and around Dugo Selo. Martin Breg and the surrounding area is the region of vineyards, orchards and holiday houses. Lakes on Ciglana, the area of artificial lakes, are ideal for angling, relaxation and recreation. There are tennis courts on Martin Breg and in Dugo Selo, or you may want to try horseback riding (the family Bunčić vineyard cottage).

== Education ==
There are two elementary and one high school in Dugo Selo. The high school offers a variety of different educational paths.

== Culture ==
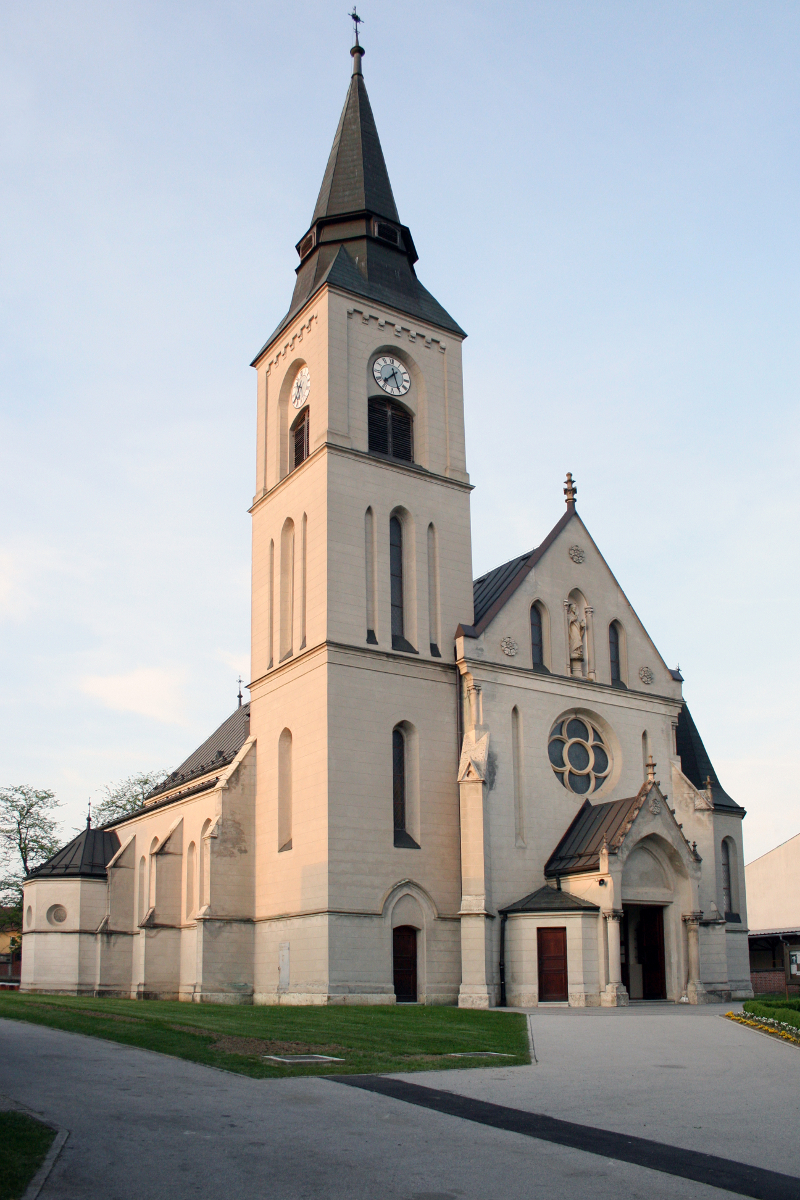
Church of Saint Martin in Dugo Selo

Traditional events, church feasts and customs must also be duly mentioned. Among these especially important for the region are holidays of wine and fruit growers. Vincekovo (St. Vincent's Day) is celebrated on 22 January on Martin Breg with wine tasting and eating of domestic cuisine specialities. In May, just before the Statehood Day an Exhibition of Wines from Dugo Selo and Vrbovec wine-growing hills is organised on Martin Breg. Martinje (St. Martin's Day) is observed on 10 and 11 November. This is also celebrated as the Day of Dugo Selo when a huge village party is organised and must baptised on Central Square, on top of Martin Breg, in vineyards and pubs. Carnival is held in February, featuring masqueraded processions, selection of the best group and best individual mask. The Radio Martin anniversary is marked at the end of August or beginning of September. Traditional sporting events are also organised: a tennis tournament in the organisation of Tennis Club "Martin Breg" is held every spring and autumn on Martin Breg. In July Martin car rally is driven on the streets of Dugo Selo as part of central European zone championship in the organisation of Dugo Selo Automobile Association. Every spring and autumn the Kennel Club organises dog-show and competition. Art exhibitions are organised in Narodno sveučilište (University Extension). This is also where some paintings given to Dugo Selo by prominent painters upon their visit to the town are kept.
