= Deaths in August 2017 =

The following is a list of notable deaths in August 2017.

Entries for each day are listed alphabetically by surname. A typical entry lists information in the following sequence:

- Name, age, country of citizenship at birth, subsequent country of citizenship (if applicable), what subject was noted for, cause of death (if known), and reference.

== August 2017 ==
=== 1 ===
- Ana-Maria Avram, 55, Romanian composer.
- Sir Patrick Bateson, 79, English biologist, Provost of King's College, Cambridge (1987–2003).
- Pushpa Mittra Bhargava, 89, Indian scientist, writer, and administrator.
- Sir John Blelloch, 86, British civil servant, Permanent Secretary at the Northern Ireland Office (1988–1990).
- Jeffrey Brotman, 74, American businessman, co-founder of Costco, heart failure.
- Hans Fahsl, 75, German Olympic athlete (1964, 1968).
- Ian Graham, 93, British Mayanist.
- Daniel James III, 71, American Lieutenant General, Director of the Air National Guard (2002–2006), heart failure.
- Jaroslav Konečný, 72, Czechoslovak Olympic handball player (1972).
- Alfie Lorenzo, 78, Filipino talent manager, heart failure.
- Mariann Mayberry, 52, American actress (War of the Worlds), ovarian cancer.
- Goldy McJohn, 72, Canadian keyboardist (Steppenwolf), heart attack.
- Harunur Rashid Khan Monno, 84, Bangladeshi industrialist and politician, MP (1991–2003).
- Bud Moore, 75, American racing driver (NASCAR).
- Phil Muntz, 83, Canadian-born American aerospace engineer, physicist and Canadian football player.
- Shōgorō Nishimura, 87, Japanese film director (Moeru Tairiku, Cruel Female Love Suicide, Apartment Wife: Affair In the Afternoon).
- John Reaves, 67, American football player (Cincinnati Bengals, Philadelphia Eagles).
- Diana Reynell, 83, English grotto designer.
- Patrick Thomas, 85, Australian conductor.
- Eric Zumbrunnen, 52, American film editor (Being John Malkovich, Her, Adaptation), cancer.

=== 2 ===
- Tore Bøgh, 93, Norwegian diplomat, Ambassador to Yugoslavia (1980–1988) and Portugal (1988–1992).
- David Caldwell, 85, Scottish footballer (Aberdeen F.C.).
- Wanda Chotomska, 87, Polish children's author and screenwriter (Jacek i Agatka).
- Tony Cohen, 60, Australian record producer (Nick Cave and the Bad Seeds).
- Sir Alcon Copisarow, 97, British civil servant and management consultant.
- Santosh Mohan Dev, 83, Indian politician, Ministry of Heavy Industries and Public Enterprises (2005–2009).
- Robin Eady, 76, British dermatologist.
- Alexander Gerasimenko, 71, Belarusian diplomat and politician, Mayor of Minsk (1991–1995).
- Marshall Goldman, 87, American economist.
- Sir John Graham, 82, New Zealand rugby union player (Canterbury, national team), sports administrator, and educator (Auckland Grammar School), cancer.
- Duke Harris, 75, Canadian ice hockey player (Minnesota North Stars), complications from heart surgery.
- David Ince, 96, British WWII RAF officer.
- Judith Jones, 93, American book editor (Alfred A. Knopf) and publishing proponent (Anne Frank: The Diary of a Young Girl, Mastering the Art of French Cooking).
- Leonard H. Lavin, 97, American businessman (Alberto-Culver) and racehorse owner.
- Daniel Licht, 60, American soundtrack composer (Dexter, Thinner, Dishonored) and musician, sarcoma.
- Jim Marrs, 73, American journalist, author, and conspiracy theorist, heart attack.
- Rosemary Reed Miller, 78, American historian and boutique owner.
- Ara Parseghian, 94, American football player and coach (University of Notre Dame).
- Paul Renton, 54, New Zealand rugby union player (Manawatu, Mid Canterbury, Hawke's Bay), suicide.
- Victoria Scalisi, 53, American singer, colorectal cancer.
- Erich Schwandt, 82, Canadian musician and musicologist.
- Don Sharpless, 84, American sound engineer (The Hindenburg, Slap Shot, Murder, She Wrote).
- Shen Daren, 89, Chinese politician, Communist Party Chief of Ningxia (1986–1989) and Jiangsu (1989–1993).
- Ely Tacchella, 81, Swiss football player (national team).
- Graham Wiltshire, 86, English cricket player and coach (Gloucestershire).

=== 3 ===
- Émile Belcourt, 91, Canadian operatic tenor.
- Giovanni Benedetti, 100, Italian Roman Catholic prelate, Bishop of Foligno (1976–1992).
- David James Bowen, 91, Welsh academic (University of Wales, Aberystwyth).
- Claudia Pinza Bozzolla, 92, Argentine-born American opera singer and teacher.
- Kevin Carton, 83, Australian Olympic hockey player (1956, 1960).
- Ladislav Čisárik, 63, Slovak heraldic artist, co-designed the national coat of arms and flag.
- Margaret Colquhoun, 70, British evolutionary biologist.
- Jacques Daoust, 69, Canadian politician, Québec Minister for Transport (2016) and MNA (2014–2016).
- Bonaventura Duda, 93, Croatian Franciscan friar and theologian.
- Richard Dudman, 99, American journalist (St. Louis Post-Dispatch, Denver Post, Bangor Daily News).
- Hans Fahsl, 75, German Olympic athlete.
- William E. Gorder, 88, American politician.
- Ty Hardin, 87, American actor (Bronco, Berserk!, Battle of the Bulge).
- Robert Hardy, 91, British actor (All Creatures Great and Small, Harry Potter, Sense and Sensibility).
- Julia Harrison, 97, American politician and activist, cancer.
- Garry Hart, Baron Hart of Chilton, 77, British life peer, member of the House of Lords (since 2004), cancer.
- Dickie Hemric, 83, American basketball player (Boston Celtics, Wake Forest Demon Deacons).
- Souad Al-Humaidhi, 78, Kuwaiti businesswoman, banker and real estate developer (Bank Audi, Commercial Bank of Kuwait, Solidere).
- Eberhard von Koerber, 79, German manager, Chairman of World Organization of the Scout Movement (2003–2006) and co-president of Club of Rome (2007–2012).
- Laurent Lavigne, 81, Canadian politician, MNA (1976–1985).
- Jill McElmurry, 62, American painter, breast cancer.
- Dejan Miladinović, 68, Serbian opera director.
- Ángel Nieto, 70, Spanish motorcycle racer, winner of 13 Grand Prix World Championships, cerebral edema.
- Iwao Ōtani, 98, Japanese film recording engineer.
- Alan Peckolick, 76, American graphic designer (Revlon).
- Ioan Popa, 64, Romanian Olympic fencer (1976, 1980).
- Çetin Şahiner, 82, Turkish Olympic hurdler.
- Chandra Sathe, 69, Indian cricket umpire.

=== 4 ===
- Émile Baffert, 92, French racing cyclist.
- Richard Bonney, 70, English historian and priest.
- Laurie Brokenshire, 64, English Royal Navy officer and magician, brain cancer.
- Erling Brøndum, 87, Danish journalist and politician, Minister of Defence (1973–1975).
- Gene Brown, 91, American professor emeritus.
- Raffaele Calabro, 77, Italian Roman Catholic prelate, Bishop of Andria (1988–2016).
- Bruno Canfora, 92, Italian jazz composer, conductor and music arranger.
- Robbie Davies, 67, British Olympic boxer (1976).
- John Frame, 86, Canadian Anglican prelate, Bishop of Yukon⋅(1968–1980).
- Chuck Hay, 87, Scottish curler, world champion (1967).
- Angel G. Jordan, 86, Spanish-born American computer engineer.
- Walter Levin, 92, German-born American violinist (LaSalle Quartet).
- Luiz Melodia, 66, Brazilian actor, singer and songwriter, bone marrow cancer.
- Reijo Puiras, 65, Canadian Olympic cross-country skier (1976).
- Waldemar Schreckenberger, 87, German lawyer, jurist and politician, Minister of Justice (1981–1982) and Chancellery Chief of Staff (1982–1984).
- Jessy Serrata, 63, American Tejano musician, kidney cancer.
- Harry Szulborski, 90, American football player.
- Bogusław Wolniewicz, 89, Polish philosopher, professor and journalist (Radio Maryja).

=== 5 ===
- Dame Helen Alexander, 60, British businesswoman, President of CBI (2009–2011), Chairwoman of PLA (2010–2015) and Chancellor of University of Southampton (since 2011), cancer.
- Irina Berezhna, 36, Ukrainian politician, People's Deputy (2007–2014), traffic collision.
- Ralph Biasi, 69, Brazilian politician, Mayor of Americana (1973–1977) and Minister for Science and Technology (1988–1989).
- Lee Blakeley, 45, British opera and theatre director, heart attack.
- Patricia Bridges, 95, Australian golfer.
- Joe Cilia, 79, Maltese footballer (Valletta, Rabat Ajax, national team).
- Martin Clark, 78, British historian of Italy, complications of Parkinson's disease.
- Theodore Frankel, 88, American mathematician.
- Egbert Haverkamp-Begemann, 94, Dutch-born American art historian.
- Doug Insole, 91, English cricketer (Essex, England).
- Garnett Kelly, 93, American politician.
- Wojciech Krzemiński, 84, Polish astronomer.
- Roy Lunn, 92, American automotive engineer, stroke.
- Hélène Martini, 92, French nightclub owner (Folies Bergère).
- Christian Millau, 88, French food critic and author.
- Richard O'Brien, 60, American television director (Fox News), complications from injuries sustained in traffic collision.
- William S. Patout III, 84, American sugar executive.
- Marcelino Perelló Valls, 73, Mexican activist (Mexico 68) and journalist (Excélsior).
- Doug Shave, 70, Australian politician, member of the Western Australian Legislative Assembly (1989–2001).
- Geoffrey Sims, 90, British physicist.
- George Bundy Smith, 80, American lawyer and judge, New York Supreme Court (1980–1992) and Court of Appeals (1992–2006).
- Dionigi Tettamanzi, 83, Italian Roman Catholic cardinal, Archbishop of Milan (2002–2011), Genoa (1995–2002), and Ancona-Osimo (1989–1991).
- Mark White, 77, American politician, Governor of Texas (1983–1987), Attorney General of Texas (1979–1983), heart attack.
- Ernst Zündel, 78, German Holocaust denial publisher and pamphleteer (Samisdat Publishers).

=== 6 ===
- Wolfgang H. Berger, 79, German-American oceanographer, geologist and micropaleontologist, emeritus professor at Scripps Institution of Oceanography.
- Arthur Boyars, 92, British poet and musicologist.
- Nicole Bricq, 70, French politician, Deputy (1997–2002), Senator (2004–2012, since 2014), Minister for Ecology, Sustainable Development and Energy (2012) and Foreign Trade (2012–2014), fall.
- Betty Cuthbert, 79, Australian Hall of Fame athlete, fourfold Olympic champion (1956 (3), 1964), complications from multiple sclerosis.
- Darren Daulton, 55, American baseball player (Philadelphia Phillies, Florida Marlins), World Series champion (1997), glioblastoma.
- Hugh Heclo, 74, American political scientist.
- Eugene Hlywa, 91, Ukrainian-born Australian psychologist.
- Tim Homer, 43, New Zealand radio host.
- Hinrich Lehmann-Grube, 84, German politician, Mayor of Leipzig (1990–1998), cancer.
- Li Shengjiao, 82, Chinese diplomat, international jurist, educator and bilingual author.
- Dick Locher, 88, American cartoonist (Dick Tracy), Pulitzer Prize winner (1983), Parkinson's disease.
- David Maslanka, 73, American composer, colon cancer.
- Daniel McKinnon, 90, American ice hockey player, Olympic silver medalist (1956).
- Kevin McNamara, 82, British politician, MP for Hull North (1966–1974, 1983–2005) and Hull Central (1974–1983), pancreatic cancer.
- Jack Rabinovitch, 87, Canadian real estate developer (Trizec Properties) and philanthropist, founder of the Scotiabank Giller Prize, fall.
- Martin Roth, 62, German museologist, Director of the Victoria and Albert Museum (2011–2016).

=== 7 ===
- Vytautas Astrauskas, 86, Lithuanian politician, President of the Presidium of the Supreme Soviet (1987–1990).
- Don Baylor, 68, American baseball player (Baltimore Orioles, California Angels) and manager (Colorado Rockies), World Series champion (1987), multiple myeloma.
- Chantek, 39, American hybrid orangutan who learned American Sign Language, heart disease.
- Tor Røste Fossen, 77, Norwegian football player and manager (Rosenborg, Start, national team).
- David Heimbach, 78, American surgeon.
- Wendy Hunt, 64, American disc jockey, suicide.
- Michael A. Lehman, 74, American politician, member of the Wisconsin Assembly (1989–2005).
- Haruo Nakajima, 88, Japanese actor (Godzilla, Destroy All Monsters, Seven Samurai), pneumonia.
- Wanda Nuti, 91, Italian Olympic gymnast (1948).
- Sigmund Sobolewski, 94, Polish activist and Holocaust survivor, pneumonia.
- Ralf Stemmann, 59, German-born American record producer and musician.
- Colin Still, 74, Australian architect, prostate cancer.
- Patsy Ticer, 82, American politician, member of the Virginia Senate (1996–2011) and Mayor of Alexandria, Virginia (1991–1996), complications from a fall.
- Duane Wardlow, 85, American football player (Los Angeles Rams).
- Kjellfred Weum, 77, Norwegian Olympic hurdler (1968).

=== 8 ===
- Merv Agars, 92, Australian footballer (West Adelaide).
- Arleta, 72, Greek singer, songwriter and book illustrator, stroke.
- Rosemary Balmford, 83, Australian jurist.
- Jean-Marie Berthier, 77, French poet, traffic collision.
- Blanche Blackwell, 104, Jamaican socialite.
- Julio César Bonino, 70, Uruguayan Roman Catholic prelate, Bishop of Tacuarembó (since 1990).
- Eugene Burger, 78, American magician, cancer.
- Glen Campbell, 81, American singer ("Rhinestone Cowboy", "By the Time I Get to Phoenix") and actor (True Grit), Grammy winner (1967, 2015), Alzheimer's disease.
- Barbara Cook, 89, American singer and actress (The Music Man, Sondheim on Sondheim, Candide), respiratory failure.
- Roger Counsil, 82, American gymnastics coach.
- Max De Pree, 92, American businessman (Herman Miller), cancer and kidney failure.
- Mike Deakin, 83, English footballer (Crystal Palace).
- Hashem El Madani, 88–89, Lebanese photographer.
- Emerson H. Fly, 82, American academic administrator, president of the University of Tennessee system (2001–2002), Parkinson's disease.
- Arlene Gottfried, 66, American photographer, breast cancer.
- Pierre Jaubert, 88, French record producer.
- Ken Kaiser, 72, American baseball umpire, American League (1977–1999), complications from diabetes.
- Ke Jun, 100, Chinese metallurgist.
- Dick MacPherson, 86, American football coach (UMass, Syracuse, New England Patriots).
- Cathleen Synge Morawetz, 94, Canadian mathematician.
- Pēteris Plakidis, 70, Latvian composer and pianist.
- Rius, 83, Mexican intellectual, political cartoonist and writer.
- Ken Roberts, 79, British rugby league player (Swinton, Halifax, Great Britain).
- Gonzague Saint Bris, 69, French novelist and biographer, Prix Interallié winner (2002), traffic collision.
- Janet Seidel, 62, Australian cabaret singer, jazz vocalist, pianist and music teacher (Sydney Girls High School), Bell Awards winner (2006), ovarian cancer.
- Gyan Singh Sohanpal, 92, Indian politician, Speaker of the West Bengal Legislative Assembly (2011).
- Zeny Zabala, 80, Filipina actress (Sampaguita Pictures).
- Mattlan Zackhras, 47, Marshallese politician and diplomat, member of the Nitijela (since 2004), Minister in Assistance to the President of Marshall Islands (since 2016).
- Jorge Zorreguieta, 89, Argentine businessman and politician, Secretary of Agriculture, Livestock and Fisheries (1979–1981), leukemia.

=== 9 ===
- Thomas A. Bird, 98, British WWII army officer and architect.
- Jerry Campbell, 73, American football player (Ottawa Rough Riders, Calgary Stampeders), heart attack.
- Romdhan Chatta, 77, Tunisian actor.
- Bill Conterio, 87, American Olympic soccer player.
- Ted Corbett, 82, English cricket writer (The Hindu).
- Aubyn Curtiss, 92, American politician, member of the Montana House of Representatives (1977–1983; 1995–2002).
- Patricio Echegaray, 70, Argentine politician, General Secretary of the Communist Party of Argentina (since 1986).
- Patricia Giles, 88, Australian women's rights activist and politician, Senator for Western Australia (1981–1993), dementia.
- Ed Greene, 82, American sound engineer (Whose Line Is It Anyway?, American Idol, So You Think You Can Dance), 21-time Emmy winner.
- Khine Htoo, 61, Burmese singer, pancreatic cancer.
- Sanwar Lal Jat, 62, Indian politician, MP for Ajmer (since 2014), Minister of State for Water Resources, River Development & Ganga Rejuvenation (2014–2016), kidney failure.
- Beethoven Javier, 70, Uruguayan football player and coach.
- Johno Johnson, 87, Australian politician, President of the New South Wales Legislative Council (1978–1991).
- Tony Keady, 53, Irish hurler (Killimordaly), complications from a heart attack.
- Kerk Kim Hock, 61, Malaysian politician, MP (1986–2004), complications from deep vein thrombosis.
- Dick Langley, 80, American politician.
- Malle Leis, 77, Estonian painter.
- Hugo Maiocco, 90, American sprinter.
- Al McCandless, 90, American politician, member of the U.S. House of Representatives from California's 37th and 44th congressional districts (1983–1995).
- Raymond Damase Ngollo, 81, Congolese general.
- Marcel Rué, 90, Monegasque Olympic sports shooter.
- Robert Joseph Shaheen, 80, American Maronite clergyman, Eparch of Our Lady of Lebanon of Los Angeles (2000–2013).
- Janie Shores, 85, American judge, Alabama Supreme Court (1974–1999), stroke.
- Marián Varga, 70, Slovak organist and composer.
- Danny Walton, 70, American baseball player (Milwaukee Brewers, Minnesota Twins).
- Wang Xiuyun, 72, Singaporean actress.
- Peter Weibel, 66, German Olympic racing cyclist (1972, 1976), cancer.
- Mac Wilson, 103, Australian football player.

=== 10 ===
- Jim Chandler, 76, American author.
- Miroslav Ćurčić, 55, Serbian footballer (FK Vojvodina).
- Katalin Csőke, 60, Hungarian Olympic discus thrower (1980).
- Sam Dryden, 67, American food security expert, multiple systems atrophy.
- Alois Eisenträger, 90, German footballer.
- Don Gross, 86, American baseball player (Cincinnati Redlegs, Pittsburgh Pirates).
- Luciano Guerzoni, 82, Italian politician, President of Emilia-Romagna region (1987–1990) and Senator (1992–2006).
- Chris Hesketh, 73, English rugby league player (Wigan, Salford, national team).
- Inamul Haque Khan, 90, Pakistani air marshal and politician, Minister of Interior (1978), Housing and Works (1978–1982, 1997–1999), and Water and Power (1980–1981).
- Barry Myers, 78, American baseball college coach.
- Vijay Nambisan, 54, Indian poet.
- Sheila Natusch, 91, New Zealand naturalist, writer and illustrator.
- Jim Nevin, 86, Australian Olympic racing cyclist (1952, 1956).
- Patrick O'Connell, 83, Irish actor.
- Sitaram Panchal, 54, Indian actor (Peepli Live, Lajja, Slumdog Millionaire), kidney and lung cancer.
- Zygfryd Perlicki, 85, Polish Olympic sailor (1972), (Copernicus).
- Ruth Pfau, 87, German-Pakistani nun and physician.
- Robert Pickrell, 94, American politician.
- T. Jack Thompson, 74, British historian, cancer.

=== 11 ===
- Abdulhussain Abdulredha, 78, Kuwaiti actor and writer.
- Luiz Vicente Bernetti, 83, Italian-born Brazilian Roman Catholic prelate, Bishop of Apucarana (2005–2009).
- Susan Brown, 79, British mathematician.
- Segun Bucknor, 71, Nigerian musician, complications from multiple strokes.
- Neil Chayet, 78, American lawyer and radio personality (WBZ), cancer.
- Richard Gordon, 95, English physician and author (Doctor).
- Yisrael Kristal, 113, Polish-Israeli supercentenarian and Holocaust survivor, world's oldest living man.
- Jerry Janes, 82, Canadian football player (BC Lions).
- Kent Lee, 94, American naval officer, Vice Admiral of the U.S. Navy.
- Ruth Matlack, 86, American baseball player (Fort Wayne Daisies).
- Terele Pávez, 78, Spanish actress (Witching & Bitching, La Celestina, The Bar), Goya winner (2013), stroke.
- Eugenio Polgovsky, 40, Mexican filmmaker.
- Daisy Sweeney, 97, Canadian music teacher.
- Kim Wall, 30, Swedish journalist (The New York Times, The Guardian, Time), homicide.

=== 12 ===
- Nils G. Åsling, 89, Swedish entrepreneur, politician and farmer, Minister of Industry (1976–1978, 1979–1982).
- Christopher Buxton, 88, English property developer.
- Paul Casanova, 75, Cuban baseball player (Washington Senators, Atlanta Braves), cardiorespiratory complications.
- Sir Richard Hanbury-Tenison, 92, Welsh-Irish diplomat.
- Martin Harty, 98, American politician.
- Zdravko Hebel, 74, Croatian water polo player, Olympic champion (1968) and President of Croatian Olympic Committee (2000–2002).
- Fatima Ahmed Ibrahim, 84, Sudanese writer and feminist.
- Junzo Kawamori, 75, Japanese tennis player, liver failure.
- Leo Kieffer, 86, American politician, member of the Maine Senate (1992–2000).
- Bryan Murray, 74, Canadian ice hockey coach and general manager (Ottawa Senators, Washington Capitals, Detroit Red Wings), colon cancer.
- Don Pettie, 90, Canadian Olympic sprinter.
- Tudor Postelnicu, 85, Romanian politician, police officer and criminal, head of the Securitate (1978–1987), Minister of Internal Affairs (1987–1989).
- John F. Russo, 84, American politician, member of the New Jersey Senate (1974–1992), President of the Senate (1986–1990), esophageal cancer.

=== 13 ===
- Aung Shwe, 99, Burmese politician and army general.
- Harry Beitzel, 90, Australian football umpire and broadcaster.
- Joseph Bologna, 82, American actor (Blame It on Rio, My Favorite Year, The Big Bus) and writer, Emmy winner (1973), pancreatic cancer.
- Reinhard Breymayer, 73, German philologist.
- Savino Bernardo Maria Cazzaro Bertollo, 92, Italian-Chilean Roman Catholic prelate, Archbishop of Puerto Montt (1988–2001).
- Hassan Dyamwale, 76, Tanzanian Olympic middle-distance runner and politician.
- Robert F. Garrison, 81, American astrophysicist.
- Stephen Keynes, 89, English banker.
- Sylvester Li Jiantang, 91, Chinese Roman Catholic prelate, Archbishop of Taiyuan (1994–2013).
- Nick Mantis, 81, American basketball player (Minneapolis Lakers, St. Louis Hawks, Chicago Zephyrs).
- Basilio Martín Patino, 86, Spanish film and documentary director (Canciones para después de una guerra, Caudillo).
- Victor Pemberton, 85, British writer and television producer (Doctor Who, Fraggle Rock, The Adventures of Black Beauty).
- Shobha Sen, 93, Indian actress, natural causes.
- Carlos Tomasi, 87, Argentine Olympic bobsledder.
- Paul Xie Ting-zhe, 86, Chinese Roman Catholic prelate, Bishop of Xinjiang-Urumqi.

=== 14 ===
- Leonard E. Baum, 85, American mathematician.
- Andrzej Blumenfeld, 66, Polish actor (The Pianist, Delivery Man, The Witcher).
- Frank Broyles, 92, American college football coach and athletic director (Arkansas Razorbacks), Alzheimer's disease.
- Franklin Cleckley, 77, American state judge, member of the Supreme Court of West Virginia (1994–1996).
- Raymond Coppinger, 80, American cognitive scientist, cancer.
- Mohammad Ali Falahatinejad, 41, Iranian weightlifter, World champion (2003), kidney infection.
- Abdelkrim Ghallab, 97, Moroccan politician and writer.
- Winston Green, 58, Jamaican dentist and politician, MP (since 2016).
- Joi Harris, 40, American motorcycle racer and stuntwoman (Deadpool 2), motorcycle stunt accident.
- Allan Hay, 88, Canadian chemist.
- Benard Ighner, 72, American musician, record producer (Who Is This Bitch, Anyway?) and songwriter, lung cancer.
- Robert Millman, 77, American physician.
- Nubar Ozanyan, 61, Turkish Armenian militant, shot.
- J. S. Parker, 72, New Zealand painter, lung cancer.
- Lateef Raji, 54, Nigerian politician.
- Thomas L. Saaty, 91, American mathematician.
- Neil Smyth, 89, Australian cricketer.
- Robert B. Stobaugh, 89, American economics writer.
- Stephen Wooldridge, 39, Australian Olympic cyclist (2004) and world champion (2002, 2003, 2004, 2006), suicide.
- Bhakti Yadav, 91, Indian doctor.

=== 15 ===
- Abdirahman Barre, 79, Somali politician, Deputy Prime Minister (1987–1991), Minister of Finance (1987–1991) and Minister of Foreign Affairs (1989–1990).
- Gunnar Birkerts, 92, Latvian-born American architect, heart failure.
- Liam Devaney, 82, Irish hurler (Tipperary GAA).
- Pavel Egorov, 69, Russian pianist, cancer.
- Vern Ehlers, 83, American politician, member of the U.S. House of Representatives from Michigan's 3rd congressional district (1993–2011).
- Tui Flower, 91, New Zealand food writer.
- Brian Gibson, 80, Australian politician, Senator for Tasmania (1993–2002), cancer.
- Maurade Glennon, 91, Irish-born American writer.
- Roger Hendrix, 74, American biologist.
- Eberhard Jäckel, 88, German historian.
- Kasatka, 41, American orca, euthanized.
- Marshall H. Klaus, 90, American neonatologist.
- Joe McGurn, 52, Scottish footballer (St Johnstone, Alloa Athletic, Stenhousemuir), cancer.
- Mark Merlis, 67, American writer (An Arrow's Flight), pneumonia.
- Thom Nairn, 62, Scottish poet and translator, complications from pneumonia.
- Paul Oliver, 90, British architecture and blues historian.
- Diane Pearson, 85, British book editor (Transworld Publishers) and author.
- Shanmugasundaram, 77, Indian actor (Karagattakaran).
- Zhu Jian'er, 94, Chinese composer.

=== 16 ===
- Peter Bird, 82, British computer scientist.
- Jennifer Daniel, 81, Welsh actress (The Reptile, Kiss of the Vampire).
- Vera Glagoleva, 61, Russian actress, People's Artist (2011), cancer.
- Kira Golovko, 98, Russian actress, People's Artist (1957).
- Tom Hawkins, 80, American basketball player (Notre Dame Fighting Irish, Los Angeles Lakers, Cincinnati Royals).
- Mike Hennessey, 89, English music journalist and jazz pianist.
- Ross Johnson, 77, American politician, member of the California State Assembly (1978–1995) and Senate (1995–2004), cancer.
- William Jones, 88, Canadian Olympic sport shooter.
- Bill Lasseter, 76, Canadian football player (BC Lions).
- Wayne Lotter, 51, South African elephant conservationist and anti-poaching activist, shot.
- Bishop Dready Manning, 83, American singer.
- Eamonn McKeon, 83, Irish Olympic boxer.
- Peter Milward, 91, British Jesuit priest and literary scholar.
- Patrick O'Flaherty, 78, Canadian historian and author.
- John Ogston, 78, Scottish footballer (Aberdeen).
- Nelia Penman, 101, British barrister and political activist.
- Roger Pinto, 57, Bolivian politician, plane crash.
- Jon Shepodd, 89, American actor (Lassie, What Ever Happened to Baby Jane?).
- David Somerset, 11th Duke of Beaufort, 89, British peer, member of the House of Lords (1984–1999).
- Vicente Sota, 93, Chilean politician, Deputy (1965–1969, 1990–1998) and President of the Chamber of Deputies (1994–1995).
- John E. Tapscott, 87, American politician, member of the Iowa House of Representatives (1967–1971) and Senate (1971–1973).
- Michael Twomey, 83, Irish actor.
- Bernadette Tynan, 51, British author and television presenter, endometrial cancer.
- Jo Walker-Meador, 93, American music executive.
- Bill Weick, 85, American wrestler and coach.
- Lester Williams, 58, American football player (New England Patriots).

=== 17 ===
- John Books, 76, Australian politician, member of the New South Wales Legislative Assembly for Parramatta (1988–1991).
- Bud Burke, 83, American politician.
- Peter Byrne, 81, Canadian Olympic sailor.
- Hélio Crescêncio, 84, Brazilian Olympic boxer.
- Francis X. DiLorenzo, 75, American Roman Catholic prelate, Bishop of Honolulu (1994–2004) and Richmond (since 2004).
- Joseph Grimberg, 84, Singaporean lawyer and judge.
- Jim Hargrove, 72, American football player (Minnesota Vikings, St. Louis Cardinals), complications from Alzheimer's disease.
- Sonny Landham, 76, American actor (Predator, 48 Hrs., Lock Up), heart failure.
- M. T. Liggett, 86, American folk sculptor.
- Parker MacDonald, 84, Canadian ice hockey player (Detroit Red Wings, Minnesota North Stars).
- John Nderu, 71, Kenyan Olympic boxer.
- Mohamed Refaat El-Saeed, 84, Egyptian politician and scholar.
- Dorice Reid, 88, American baseball player (Grand Rapids Chicks, Chicago Colleens).
- Jerry Roberts, 77, American football coach.
- Sirkka Selja, 97, Finnish poet.
- Paulo Silvino, 78, Brazilian actor and humorist (A Praça É Nossa, Zorra Total), stomach cancer.
- Fadwa Souleimane, 47, Syrian actress and activist, cancer.
- Halwa Vasu, 54, Indian comic actor (Amaidhi Padai), liver failure.

=== 18 ===
- Pertti Alaja, 65, Finnish footballer (Malmö), President of Football Association of Finland (since 2012), cancer.
- Alfonso Azpiri, 70, Spanish videogame cover and comic artist.
- Sonny Burgess, 88, American rockabilly guitarist, singer and songwriter.
- Duncan Bush, 71, Welsh author.
- Dave Creighton, 87, Canadian ice hockey player (Boston Bruins, New York Rangers, Toronto Maple Leafs).
- Arthur J. Finkelstein, 72, American political consultant, lung cancer.
- Sir Bruce Forsyth, 89, English television presenter (The Generation Game, Play Your Cards Right, Strictly Come Dancing) and entertainer, bronchial pneumonia.
- Vicente Iturat, 88, Spanish racing cyclist.
- William Kretschmar, 84, American lawyer and politician, member of the North Dakota House of Representatives (1973–1998, 2000–2017).
- Zoe Laskari, 72, Greek actress and beauty pageant winner (Miss Hellas 1959).
- Mirosława Litmanowicz, 89, Polish chess player.
- Liz MacKean, 52, British broadcast journalist (Newsnight), stroke.
- Venero Mangano, 95, American bookmaker, racketeer and extortionist (Genovese crime family).
- Roger D. McKellips, 94, American politician, member of the South Dakota Senate (1977–1978, 1981–1994).
- Lívia Mossóczy, 81, Hungarian table tennis player, World champion (1957).
- Tadayoshi Nagashima, 66, Japanese politician, member of the House of Representatives (since 2005), mayor of Yamakoshi, Niigata (2000–2005).
- Duncan Russell, 59, English football manager (Mansfield Town), cancer.
- Don Shepherd, 90, Welsh cricketer (Glamorgan).
- Sergio Zaniboni, 80, Italian comics artist (Diabolik).

=== 19 ===
- Brian Aldiss, 92, British science fiction writer (Helliconia, Greybeard, Supertoys Last All Summer Long) and editor.
- Charles R. Bentley, 87, American glaciologist.
- Len Bracko, 73, Canadian politician, member of the Legislative Assembly of Alberta (1993–1997).
- Mario Roberto Cassari, 73, Italian Roman Catholic prelate and diplomat, Apostolic Nuncio to Malta (2015–2016) and South Africa (2012–2015).
- Pyotr Deynekin, 79, Russian military officer, commander of the Russian Air Force (1992–1998), Hero of the Russian Federation (1997).
- Salif Diallo, 60, Burkinabé politician, President of the National Assembly (since 2015).
- Cliff Eade, 84, Australian rules footballer (Richmond).
- Gérard Férey, 76, French chemist.
- Janusz Głowacki, 78, Polish-American playwright, screenwriter and essayist.
- Karl Otto Götz, 103, German artist, filmmaker, and writer.
- Dick Gregory, 84, American comedian and civil rights activist, heart failure.
- Gary O'Callaghan, 83, Australian radio broadcaster (2UE, 2SM).
- Jorge Rodriguez-Chomat, 72, Cuban-born American politician and judge, member of the Florida House of Representatives (1994–1998) and the Eleventh Judicial Circuit Court (2011–2017).
- Alan Sayers, 101, New Zealand athlete, journalist and writer, British Empire Games bronze medalist (1938).
- Ed Sharockman, 77, American football player (Minnesota Vikings), heart failure.
- Shane Sieg, 34, American racing driver (NASCAR).
- Concha Valdés Miranda, 89, Cuban composer.
- Bea Wain, 100, American singer, heart failure.

=== 20 ===
- Karin Bang, 88, Norwegian writer.
- Rae Linda Brown, 63, American musicologist, cancer.
- Erich Butka, 73, Austrian Olympic judoka.
- Velichko Cholakov, 35, Bulgarian weightlifter, European champion (2004), Olympic bronze medalist (2004).
- Radoš Čubrić, 83, Serbian Yugoslav Olympic cyclist (1972).
- Bernard Dunstan, 97, British artist.
- Olivia Gant, 7, American child, starvation.
- Harry Haureliuk, 70, Australian bodybuilder.
- Margot Hielscher, 97, German singer and film actress.
- Wilhelm Killmayer, 89, German composer, conductor and lecturer.
- Minoru Kubota, 87, Japanese Olympic weightlifter.
- Fredell Lack, 95, American violinist.
- Jerzy Leśniak, 60, Polish journalist and historian, heart attack.
- Jerry Lewis, 91, American comedian (Martin and Lewis), actor (The Nutty Professor) and humanitarian (The Jerry Lewis MDA Labor Day Telethon), cardiomyopathy.
- Sir Colin Meads, 81, New Zealand rugby union player, coach and manager (King Country, national team, Cavaliers), pancreatic cancer.
- Nati Mistral, 88, Spanish actress and singer (Currito of the Cross, Cabaret, Mis tres amores).
- Clive Piercy, 62, British-born American graphic designer.
- Wallace Stieffen, 92, American politician.
- Gary West, 57, Australian Olympic cyclist and cycling coach, motor neurone disease.
- Gordon Williams, 83, Scottish writer (The Siege of Trencher's Farm).
- Lance Williams, 67, American graphics researcher, cancer.

=== 21 ===
- Lou Clare, 67, Canadian football player (Hamilton Tiger-Cats, Saskatchewan Roughriders, Montreal Alouettes).
- Arturo Corcuera, 81, Peruvian poet.
- Dianne de Las Casas, 47, Filipino-born American author, house fire.
- Josip Despot, 64, Croatian Olympic rower.
- Réjean Ducharme, 76, Canadian novelist and playwright.
- Greg Evers, 62, American politician, member of the Florida House of Representatives (2001–2010) and Senate (2010–2016), traffic collision.
- Roberto Gottardi, 90, Italian architect.
- Bill Green, 66, English football player (Hartlepool United, Chesterfield) and manager (Scunthorpe United).
- Helmut Hofmann, 91, German Olympic boxer (1952).
- Thomas Meehan, 88, American playwright (Annie, The Producers, Hairspray), Tony winner (1977), cancer.
- Don Nichols, 92, American motorsport team owner.
- Rikard Olsvik, 87, Norwegian politician, MP (1981–1993).
- Helmut Piirimäe, 86, Estonian historian.
- P. V. R. K. Prasad, 77, Indian civil servant.
- Ron Previte, 73, American gangster.
- Felo Ramírez, 94, Cuban-American sports broadcaster (Miami Marlins), complications from a fall.
- Abdur Razzak, 75, Bangladeshi actor (Boro Bhalo Lok Chhilo), five-time winner of National Film Award for Best Actor.
- Bajram Rexhepi, 63, Kosovar politician, Prime Minister (2002–2004), stroke.
- Seija Simola, 72, Finnish singer.
- Boris Spremo, 81, Yugoslav-born Canadian photojournalist (Toronto Star, The Globe and Mail), complications from multiple myeloma.
- Dame Margaret Turner-Warwick, 92, British physician and thoracic specialist, first female president of the Royal College of Physicians.
- Perch Zeytuntsyan, 79, Egyptian-born Armenian playwright, Minister of Culture (1990–1991).

=== 22 ===
- John Abercrombie, 72, American jazz guitarist, heart failure.
- Nestor Assogba, 88, Beninese Roman Catholic prelate, Archbishop of Parakou (1976–1999) and Cotonou (1999–2005).
- Alain Berbérian, 63, French film director and writer.
- Feyyaz Berker, 91, Turkish executive (Tekfen Construction and Installation).
- Thomas W. Blackwell, 58, American politician, member of the Pennsylvania House of Representatives (2005–2008).
- Jim Blount, 82, American newspaper editor (Hamilton Journal-News) and historian.
- Jane Brewer, 93, Canadian politician.
- Tim Bruxner, 94, Australian politician, member of the New South Wales Legislative Assembly for Tenterfield (1962–1981).
- Attilio Cantoni, 86, Italian Olympic rower.
- Tony deBrum, 72, Marshallese politician, Foreign Minister (1979–1987, 2008–2009, 2014–2016).
- Gertrude Goodrich, 102, American painter and writer.
- Michael J. C. Gordon, 69, British computer scientist.
- Carol Hanson, 83, American politician, member of the Florida House of Representatives (1982–1994), Mayor of Boca Raton, Florida (1995–2001).
- Rishang Keishing, 96, Indian politician, Chief Minister of Manipur (1980–1981, 1994–1997), multiple organ failure.
- Matthew Kia Yen-wen, 92, Taiwanese Roman Catholic prelate, Archbishop of Taipei (1978–1989), Bishop of Kiayi (1970–1974) and Hwalien (1974–1978).
- Aloys Kontarsky, 86, German pianist, complications from a stroke.
- Mario Milita, 94, Italian voice actor.
- Pedro Pedrossian, 89, Brazilian politician, Governor of Mato Grosso (1966–1971) and Mato Grosso do Sul (1980–1983, 1991–1995).
- Tim Poston, 72, English mathematician.
- Tom Pritchard, 100, New Zealand cricketer (Wellington, Warwickshire, Kent).
- Fejat Sejdić, 76, Serbian brass band leader.
- Jim Whelan, 68, American politician, Mayor of Atlantic City (1990–2002), member of the New Jersey General Assembly (2006–2008) and Senate (since 2008), heart attack.

=== 23 ===
- Eduardo Angeloz, 85, Argentine politician, Governor of Córdoba (1983–1995) and Senator (1973–1976, 1995–2001).
- Tjitze Baarda, 85, Dutch theologian.
- Yossi Beinart, 61, Israeli economist, CEO of the Tel Aviv Stock Exchange (since 2014).
- Binh Pho, 61, Vietnamese artist in wood.
- Kevin Curran, 88, Zimbabwean cricketer.
- Michael Dauncey, 97, British Army brigadier.
- Viola Harris, 91, American actress (Deconstructing Harry, The Other Guys, Sex and the City 2).
- Engelbert Jarek, 82, Polish footballer (Odra Opole).
- George A. Keyworth II, 77, American physicist, prostate cancer.
- Joe Klein, 75, American baseball executive (Texas Rangers, Cleveland Indians, Detroit Tigers), complications from heart surgery.
- Ronan Leprohon, 78, French Breton nationalist politician.
- Izak Parviz Nazarian, 88, Iranian-American businessman (Omninet).
- Sean O'Callaghan, 63, Irish IRA member, informant and writer.
- John Petty, 82, English Anglican priest.
- Fiona Richardson, 50, Australian politician, member of the Victorian Legislative Assembly for Northcote (since 2006), breast cancer.
- Jack Rosenthal, 82, Israeli-born American journalist.
- Jeannie Rousseau, 98, French Allied spy.
- Ramananda Sengupta, 101, Indian cinematographer.
- Tom Tarrant, 85, Australian rules footballer (Collingwood).
- Francis Thompson, 92, British economic and social historian.
- Susan Vreeland, 71, American author, complications from heart surgery.

=== 24 ===
- Cecil Andrus, 85, American politician, U.S. Secretary of the Interior (1977–1981), Governor of Idaho (1971–1977, 1987–1995), lung cancer.
- Mark Asay, 53, American white supremacist and spree killer, execution by lethal injection.
- Michael Dougall Bell, 73, Canadian diplomat, Ambassador to Israel (1990–1992, 1999–2003), liver cancer.
- Axel Bernstein, 43, German politician, accidental fall.
- Alan Boswell, 74, English footballer (Shrewsbury Town, Bolton Wanderers).
- J. D. Disalvatore, 51, American LGBT film producer (Shelter), breast cancer.
- Thomas Docking, 63, American politician, Lieutenant Governor of Kansas (1983–1987), cancer.
- Doug Everingham, 94, Australian politician and minister, Minister for Health and Aged Care (1972–1975) and MP (1967–1975, 1977–1984).
- Gene Hamlin, 71, American football player (Chicago Bears, Detroit Lions, Washington Redskins).
- Pete Kuykendall, 79, American bluegrass musician.
- Kai Linnilä, 75, Finnish writer and editor.
- Larry Marshall, 75, Jamaican reggae singer, complications from Alzheimer's disease.
- Mary Montgomery, 60, American Olympic swimmer (1972).
- Cornelius Nugteren, 89, American major general.
- Michael Quinn, 71, British chef (The Ritz).
- Houssenaly Zahid Raza, Malaysian honorary consul, shot.
- Charlie Robertson, 83, American politician, mayor of York, Pennsylvania (1994–2002).
- Jay Thomas, 69, American actor (Cheers, Mork & Mindy, Love & War) and radio talk show host, Emmy winner (1990, 1991), cancer.
- Amelyn Veloso, 43, Filipino journalist and broadcaster (CNN Philippines), breast cancer.
- Caleb Warner, 94, American acoustical engineer.

=== 25 ===
- Martin Biles, 98, American Olympic javelin thrower (1948).
- Alfred Bloom, 91, American Shin Buddhism scholar.
- Enzo Dara, 78, Italian opera singer.
- Sharry Konopski, 49, American model and actress, pneumonia.
- Jenny Mae, 49, American singer.
- Ed McGaa, 81, American air force pilot and author, complications of cancer.
- Drew Morphett, 69, Australian sports broadcaster (ABC).
- Margaret Moser, 63, American journalist, colon cancer.
- Rich Piana, 46, American bodybuilder and Internet personality, complications from a heart attack and brain trauma.
- Marta Skupilová, 79, Czech Olympic swimmer.
- Ulrich A. Straus, 90–91, German-born American diplomat.

=== 26 ===
- Dagobert Banzio, 60, Ivorian politician.
- Dave Bumpstead, 81, English football player (Millwall, Bristol Rovers) and manager (Chelmsford City).
- Christie Davies, 75, British sociologist.
- Harry Dinnel, 76, American basketball player and coach (Anaheim Amigos).
- Takis Emmanuel, 84, Greek-born Australian actor (Zorba the Greek).
- Dámaso González, 68, Spanish bullfighter, pancreatic cancer.
- Tobe Hooper, 74, American film director (The Texas Chain Saw Massacre, Poltergeist, Salem's Lot).
- Muzaffer İzgü, 83, Turkish children's writer and teacher, cancer.
- Howard Kaminsky, 77, American publisher (Random House), heart attack.
- Tomasz Konina, 45, Polish theatre and opera director and stage designer.
- Léonard Lévesque, 82, Canadian politician, MNA (1976–1985).
- Grzegorz Miecugow, 61, Polish newscaster (Wiadomości, Fakty TVN) and columnist (Szkło kontaktowe), cancer.
- John Moore, 84, British Olympic skier.
- Josef Musil, 85, Czech volleyball player, Olympic silver (1964) and bronze (1968) medalist.
- Wilson das Neves, 81, Brazilian percussionist and singer, cancer.
- Bernard Pomerance, 76, American playwright (The Elephant Man), cancer.
- Lacey Putney, 89, American politician, member of the Virginia House of Delegates (1962–2014).
- Alan Root, 80, British-born Kenyan filmmaker, glioblastoma.
- Peter Ryalls, 79, British cyclist.
- Larry Sherman, 94, American actor (Law & Order) and publicist (Donald Trump, New Jersey Generals).
- Rick Sowieta, 63, Belgian-born Canadian football player, cancer.
- Horacio White, 90, Argentine Olympic swimmer (1948).
- Adam Wójcik, 47, Polish basketball player (Śląsk Wrocław), leukemia.

=== 27 ===
- Martin Azonhiho, Beninese politician, Minister for Defence (2006).
- Anthony Cornwell, 88, English cricketer.
- Roland P. Hofemann, 83, American politician, member of the New Hampshire House of Representatives (2002–2012).
- Ahmed Khan, 90, Indian Olympic footballer (1948, 1952).
- Khalid Ahmed Kharal, 78, Pakistani politician.
- Maurice Rigobert Marie-Sainte, 89, Martinican Roman Catholic prelate, Archbishop of Saint-Pierre and Fort-de-France (1972–2004).
- James Dickson Phillips Jr., 94, American federal judge, U.S. Court of Appeals for the Fourth Circuit (1978–1994).
- José Maria Pires, 98, Brazilian Roman Catholic prelate, Bishop of Araçuaí (1957–1965) and Archbishop of Paraíba (1965–1995), pneumonia.
- Yitzhak Pundak, 104, Polish-born Israeli military officer and diplomat.
- Irene Salemka, 86, Canadian operatic soprano.
- Syd Silverman, 85, American publisher (Variety).
- Helli Stehle, 109, Swiss actress and radio presenter.
- Chris Winn, 90, English cricketer (Sussex, Oxford University).
- Ebrahim Yazdi, 85, Iranian politician and diplomat, Minister of Foreign Affairs (1979), Deputy Prime Minister (1979), pancreatic cancer.
- M. A. Zaher, 85, Bangladeshi geologist.

=== 28 ===
- Melissa Bell, 53, English singer (Soul II Soul).
- Bobby Boyd, 79, American football player (Baltimore Colts).
- Bruce Collingwood, 64, Canadian politician.
- Muhammad Dandamayev, 88, Russian Babylon historian.
- Mireille Darc, 79, French actress (Week End, The Tall Blond Man with One Black Shoe, Icy Breasts) and model.
- Willie Duggan, 67, Irish rugby union player (Blackrock College, national team, British and Irish Lions).
- Tore Frängsmyr, 79, Swedish historian.
- Jack Geddes, 92, Canadian curler.
- Ainul Haque, 69, Bangladeshi footballer (Mohammedan, Shadhin Bangla).
- Tsutomu Hata, 82, Japanese politician, Prime Minister (1994).
- Jud Heathcote, 90, American Hall of Fame basketball coach (Michigan State Spartans, Montana Grizzlies), national champion (1979).
- Gulzar Khan, Pakistani politician, member of the National Assembly (since 2013).
- Narendra Kumar, 77, Indian physicist.
- Kirti Kumari, 50, Indian politician, MLA (since 2013), swine flu.
- Angélica Mendoza de Ascarza, 87, Peruvian human rights activist.
- Dean Mercer, 47, Australian ironman, four-time national champion (1989, 1995–1997), heart attack.
- David Torrence, 31, Peruvian-American Olympic athlete (2016).

=== 29 ===
- Adnan Abu Amjad, 39–40, Syrian military officer.
- Senarath Attanayake, 51, Sri Lankan politician.
- A. H. M. Azwer, 80, Sri Lankan politician, MP (2010–2015).
- Mahmud Kanti Bello, 72, Nigerian politician, Senator (2003–2011).
- Evdokia Bobyleva, 98, Russian teacher.
- Janine Charrat, 93, French ballerina and dance choreographer.
- Kurt Dahlmann, 99, German pilot and journalist.
- Larry Elgart, 95, American jazz bandleader.
- Carlos Gereda y de Borbón, 70, Spanish aristocrat.
- Harold Hurley, 87, Canadian ice hockey player, Olympic silver medalist (1960).
- Otto Kandler, 96, German botanist and microbiologist.
- Léon Konan Koffi, 88, Ivorian politician.
- Dmitri Kogan, 38, Russian violinist, lymphoma.
- Soledad Saieh, 45, Chilean businesswoman, film producer, and cultural manager, pulmonary edema.
- Valery Statsenko, 49, Russian Olympic diver.
- Sir David Tang, 63, Hong Kong businessman (Shanghai Tang), liver cancer.

=== 30 ===
- Elmer Acevedo, 68, Salvadoran Olympic footballer (1968), (C.D. FAS).
- Sid Ahmed Ould Bneijara, 70, Mauritanian politician, Prime Minister (1980–1981).
- Marjorie Boulton, 93, British author and poet.
- Alan Cassell, 85, Australian actor (Special Squad).
- Richard Sui On Chang, 75, American Episcopal prelate, bishop of Hawaii (1997–2006).
- Jennie Darlington, 93, Canadian polar explorer, heart illness.
- Peter Diamondstone, 82, American lawyer and politician.
- Hato Hasbún, 71, Salvadoran politician, heart attack.
- Louise Hay, 90, American motivational author (You Can Heal Your Life).
- Tessa Holyoake, 54, Scottish haematologist, cancer.
- Abdul Jabbar, 79, Bangladeshi singer.
- Efrain Loza, 78, Mexican Olympic footballer.
- Alan MacDonald, 61, British production designer (The Queen, The Best Exotic Marigold Hotel, Philomena).
- Károly Makk, 91, Hungarian film director and screenwriter.
- Rollie Massimino, 82, American Hall of Fame basketball coach (Villanova Wildcats, UNLV Runnin' Rebels, Cleveland State Vikings), national champion (1985).
- Tim Mickelson, 68, American rower, Olympic silver medalist (1972), amyotrophic lateral sclerosis.
- Sam Pivnik, 90, Polish Jewish Holocaust survivor, author and memoirist.
- Skip Prokop, 73, Canadian drummer (Lighthouse, The Paupers) and disc jockey (CFNY-FM).
- L. N. Shastri, 46, Indian playback singer, intestinal cancer.
- Sumiteru Taniguchi, 88, Japanese anti-nuclear weapons activist, cancer.

=== 31 ===
- Richard Anderson, 91, American actor (The Six Million Dollar Man, The Bionic Woman, Forbidden Planet).
- William Beik, 76, American historian.
- John Bourchier, 87, Australian politician, member of the House of Representatives for Bendigo (1972–1983).
- Christopher Byworth, 78, British Anglican priest.
- Janne Carlsson, 80, Swedish actor (Repmånad, Göta kanal eller Vem drog ur proppen?) and drummer (Hansson & Karlsson), liver cancer.
- Mike Cockerill, 56, Australian soccer journalist, cancer.
- Sir Edward du Cann, 93, British politician, MP for Taunton (1956–1987).
- Marco Ferraro, 62, Canadian curler, brain cancer.
- Alice Fischer, 85, Swiss Olympic figure skater (1956).
- Hans Forrer, 88, Swiss Olympic alpine skier.
- Egon Günther, 90, German film director and writer (Lotte in Weimar, Morenga, Her Third).
- Dirk Hafemeister, 59, German equestrian, Olympic champion (1988), heart attack.
- William Ives, 73, British executive.
- Ann Jellicoe, 90, British dramatist.
- Bernie Katz, 49, British night club manager (Groucho Club).
- Norbert Kückelmann, 87, German film director (Man Under Suspicion).
- Rick Leed, 62, American film and television producer.
- Barry Liebmann, 63, American comedy writer (Mad), liver cancer.
- Tormod MacGill-Eain, 80, Scottish comedian and singer.
- Novella Nelson, 77, American actress and singer (A Perfect Murder, Birth, Antwone Fisher).
- Jan Romare, 81, Swedish diplomat and comics artist.
- Tamara Tchinarova, 98, French ballet dancer.
