= Leśniak =

Leśniak is a Polish surname. It may refer to:

- Anka Leśniak (born 1978), Polish contemporary artist
- Filip Lesniak (born 1996), Slovak footballer
- Glenn Lesniak (born 1954), American major general
- Jan Leśniak (1898–1976), Polish military intelligence officer
- Jerzy Leśniak (1957–2017), Polish journalist and historian
- Joseph Lesniak (1890–1979), American bishop
- Józef Leśniak (1968–2022), Polish politician
- Marek Leśniak (born 1964), Polish footballer and coach
- Marta Leśniak (born 1988), Polish tennis player
- Natalia Leśniak (born 1991), Polish archer
- Paweł Leśniak (born 1989), Polish footballer
- Raymond Lesniak (born 1946), American politician
- Zbigniew Leśniak (born 1950), Polish slalom canoeist
