= Ted Corbett =

Ted Corbett may refer to:

- Ted Corbett (journalist)
- Ted Corbett (chemist)

== See also ==
- Ted Corbitt, American long-distance runner
- Edward Corbett (disambiguation)
