= Robert Garrison =

Robert Garrison may refer to:

- Robert F. Garrison (1936– 2017), American astrophysicist
- Rob Garrison (1960– 2019), American actor
- Robert Garrison (actor) (1872–1930), German actor
- Robert Garrison (sculptor) (1895–1943), American sculptor
