= Berthier =

Berthier may refer to:

- Berthier (surname)
- Berthierville (also called Berthier-en-haut, formerly called Berthier), a town located between Montréal and Trois-Rivières
- Berthier County, former county in Quebec, Canada
- Berthier (Province of Canada electoral district)
- Berthier (provincial electoral district), in Quebec, Canada
- Berthier (federal electoral district)
- Berthier, a member of the Black Moon Clan, the primary villains in the Sailor Moon R manga and anime series

== See also ==
- Berthier rifle and carbine
