= Selja =

Selja may refer to the following:

== People ==
- Selja Kumari (born 1962), a member of the 15th Lok Sabha of India
- Sirkka Selja (1920—2017), a Finnish poet and writer

== Places ==
=== Estonia ===
- Selja, Hiiumaa Parish, village in Hiiumaa Parish, Hiiu County
- Selja, Lääne-Viru County, village in Viru-Nigula Parish, Lääne-Viru County
- Selja, Tori Parish, village in Tori Parish, Pärnu County
- Selja, Lääneranna Parish, village in Lääneranna Parish, Pärnu County
- Selja, Rapla County, village in Kehtna Parish, Rapla County
- Selja, Saare County, village in Saaremaa Parish, Saare County
- Selja (river), in Lääne-Viru County

=== Norway ===
- Selja, Selje, an island in Selje municipality, Norway; a former Catholic bishopric and now a Latin titular see as Selia

=== Sweden ===
- Selja, Sweden, a village area in Mora

=== Tunisia ===
- Selja Gorges, gorges in the Gafsa valley

== See also ==
- Selje (disambiguation)
