= Selje =

Selje may refer to:

== Places ==
- Selje Municipality, a former municipality in Vestland county, Norway
- Selje (village), a village in Stad Municipality in Vestland county, Norway
- Selje Church, a church in Stad Municipality in Vestland county, Norway
- Selje Abbey, a former Benedictine monastery located on the island of Selja in Stad Municipality in Vestland county, Norway

== Other ==
- SS Selje (1920), a former Norwegian cargo vessel
- MF Selje, a Norwegian ferry

== See also ==
- Selja (disambiguation)
