= Edward Corbett =

Edward Corbett may refer to:

- Edward Corbett (artist) (1919–1971), abstract expressionist artist
- Edward P. J. Corbett (1919–1998), American author
- Edward Corbett (politician) (1817–1895), MP for South Shropshire 1868–77
- Edward Corbet of the Corbet baronets

== See also ==
- Ted Corbett (disambiguation)
- Edward Corbet (1603–1658), English clergyman and member of the Westminster Assembly
