= Nosiv =

Rural locality in Ternopil Oblast, Ukraine

Nosiv Носів
- Location in Ternopil Oblast
- Coordinates: 49°14′1″N 25°0′34″E
- Country: Ukraine
- Oblast: Ternopil Oblast
- Raion: Ternopil Raion
- Hromada: Pidhaitsi urban hromada
- Time zone: UTC+2 (EET)
  - Summer (DST): UTC+3 (EEST)
- Postal code: 48033

Nosiv (Ukrainian: Носів) is a village in Pidhaitsi urban hromada, Ternopil Raion, Ternopil Oblast, Ukraine.

== History ==
The first written mention of the village was in 1395.

After the liquidation of the Pidhaitsi Raion on 19 July 2020, the village became part of the Ternopil Raion.

== Religion ==
- Saint Nicholas church (1835, brick).

== Notable residents ==
- Eugene Hlywa (1925–2017), psychologist, hypnotherapist.

== Sources ==
- (in Ukrainian) Кифор М., Уніят В., Носів // Ternopil Encyclopedic Dictionary: in 4 v. / editorial board: H. Yavorskyi and other, Ternopil: "Zbruch", 2005, V. 2: К—О, S. 645. — ISBN 966-528-199-2.
- "Nosów, pow. podhajecki". Geographical Dictionary of the Kingdom of Poland (in Polish). 7. Warszawa: Kasa im. Józefa Mianowskiego. 1886. p. 185.
