= Robert Crawford (Scottish poet) =

Scottish poet, scholar and critic

Robert Crawford FRSE FBA FRSL
- Born: 1959 (age 66–67); Bellshill, Scotland
- Education: Hutchesons' Grammar School; Glasgow University; Balliol College, Oxford
- Occupations: Poet, scholar and critic
- Awards: Eric Gregory Award; Scottish Arts Council Book Award

Robert Crawford FRSE FBA FRSL (born 1959) is a Scottish poet, scholar and critic. He is emeritus Professor of English at the University of St Andrews.

== Early life ==
Robert Crawford was born in Bellshill, Scotland, and grew up in Cambuslang. He was educated at the private Hutchesons' Grammar School and in the same city at Glasgow University, where he received his M.A. degree. He then went to Balliol College, Oxford, where he received his D. Phil.

=== Family ===
His paternal grandfather was a Minister in the Church of Scotland and Crawford considers himself a "Christian with a Presbyterian accent, rather than a Protestant", which he feels has rather assertive overtones in the contemporary West of Scotland. He has written on the relationship between science and religion as well as religious poetry.

== Themes ==
His main interest is in Post-Enlightenment Scottish literature, including Robert Burns and Robert Fergusson, but he has a keen interest in contemporary poetry, including Edwin Morgan, Douglas Dunn and Liz Lochhead.

Crawford is a prolific and successful poet and concerns himself with the nature and processes of creative writing. He has a particular interest in the work of T. S. Eliot and other aspects of Modernism.

He is interested in the relationship between literature, particularly poetry, and modern science, including information technology. He says he shares an appreciation of poetry and science as kinds of discovery quickened by observation and imagination. He even goes so far as to claim that it "is part of the poet's delight even duty, to use such [scientific] words and experience in poetry".

The geography and place names of Scotland feature very prominently in his own poems and he takes a lively interest in the developing politics of contemporary Scotland, as well as science, politics, religion, landscape, and environment and spirituality. Many of his poems also deal with gender and sex (particularly married sex).

== Language ==
Crawford writes in a modern English, with a few nods to dialect words, with an occasional made-up word or a word borrowed from technical science. The main forms he uses are short and lyrical. He has translated from the 17th-century Latin of the Aberdeenshire poet Arthur Johnston.

He was a founder of the international magazine Verse in 1984 and worked as poetry editor for the Edinburgh publisher Polygon in the 1990s. With Simon Armitage, he is co-editor of The Penguin Book of Poetry from Britain and Ireland since 1945 (1998) and, with Mick Imlah, he co-edited The New Penguin Book of Scottish Verse (2000). He publishes poetry and occasional works of criticism in the London Review of Books and The Times Literary Supplement.

== Selected awards and recognition ==
- 1988: Eric Gregory Award
- 1993: Scottish Arts Council Book Award for Identifying Poets
- 1999: Scottish Arts Council Book Award for Spirit Machines
- 2007: Saltire Society's Scottish Research Book of the Year for Scotland's Books: The Penguin History of Scottish Literature
- 2009: Saltire Society's Scottish Book of the Year Award for The Bard: Robert Burns, A Biography

He is a Fellow of the Royal Society of Edinburgh (FRSE). In August 2011 he was elected a Fellow of the British Academy, while in 2021 he became a Fellow of the Royal Society of Literature. He is also a Foreign Member of the Norwegian Academy of Science and Letters.

== Selected works ==
=== Literary criticism and biography ===
- Scotland's Books: The Penguin History of Scottish Literature. Penguin Books. 2007.
- The Bard: Robert Burns, A Biography. Princeton University Press. 2009.
- Young Eliot: From St Louis to The Waste Land. Jonathan Cape. 2015.
- Textual Non Sense, A Four-Part Trilogy. Boiler House. 2021. ISBN 978-1911343783.
- Eliot After The Waste Land. 2022

=== Poetry books ===
- A Scottish Assembly. Chatto & Windus. 1990.
- Talkies. Chatto & Windus. 1992. ISBN 978-0-7011-3928-5.
- Masculinity. Cape Poetry. 1996. ISBN 978-0-224-04371-7.
- Spirit Machines (1999)
- The Tip of My Tongue. Jonathan Cape. 2003. ISBN 978-0-224-06968-7.
- Full Volume. Jonathan Cape. 2008. ISBN 978-0-224-08087-3.
- Testament. Jonathan Cape. 2014. ISBN 978-0224098076.
- The Scottish Ambassador. Jonathan Cape. 2018. ISBN 978-1787330689.

=== Other ===
- "HONEY". Qualm. October 2006. Archived from the original on 20 May 2023.

=== Co-authored ===
- W. N. Herbert (1990). Sharawaggi: Poems in Scots. ISBN 978-0-7486-6066-7.

=== Edited ===
- Crawford, Robert; Nairn, Thom, eds. (1991). The Arts of Alasdair Gray. Edinburgh: Edinburgh University Press. ISBN 978-0748602940.
- Robert Crawford, ed. (2006). Contemporary Poetry and Contemporary Science. Oxford: Oxford University Press. ISBN 978-0-19-925812-3.

=== Anthologies ===
- Susanne Ehrhardt; Paul May; Lucy Anne Watt; Robert Crawford; Sarah Maguire; Mark Ford (1989). New Chatto Poets: Number Two. Chatto & Windus.
