= Anka Leśniak =

Polish artist

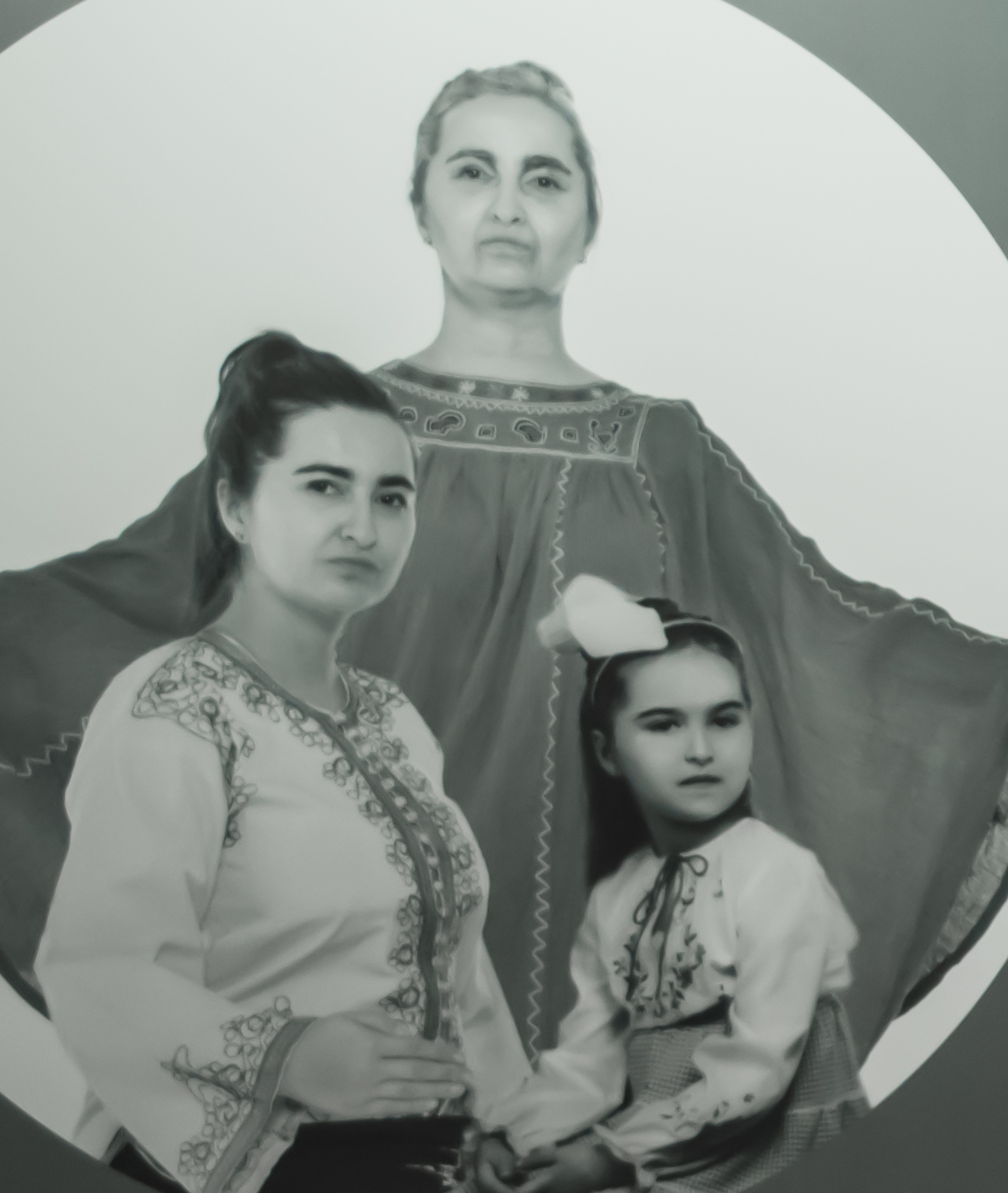
- Self portrait from an exhibition in Łódź, 2017
- Born: Anna Barbara Leśniak; 1978 (age 47–48); Bielsko-Biała, Bielsko Voivodeship, Poland
- Education: University of Łódź
- Alma mater: Academy of Fine Arts
- Movement: Frakcja
- Website: ankalesniak.pl

Anka Leśniak is a Polish contemporary artist, born in Bielsko-Biała and educated in Łódź. She specialises in installation art, performance, video art and painting.

Leśniak is the managing editor of the Art and Documentation journal. She has presented her work in more than 80 individual and group exhibitions. The majority of her work concerns the history of women. The artist often conveys this theme through site-specific pieces.

== Education ==
In 2003 Leśniak received a degree in Art History at the University of Łódź, and then in 2004 received a diploma with honors from the Academy of Fine Arts (Faculty of Visual Education - currently Visual Arts). In 2011 Leśniak was awarded a scholarship from the Ministry of Culture and National Heritage. In 2015 she received the Scholarship of President of Łódź. In 2016, she received the Cultural Scholarship of the City of Gdańsk and became a scholarship holder of the Contact Cultures and the Austrian Government as part of the Artists-in-Residence 2016 program in Vienna. In 2016 she was awarded a PhD in the field of fine arts from the Academy of Fine Arts in Gdańsk, Faculty of Sculpture and Intermedia.

== Inspirations and topics ==
The main inspiration for Leśniak's work are women active in Poland during the partitions of Poland, and during the First and Second World War. She often pays tribute to the unsung heroes of the Polish Resistance and these are, in many cases, symbolic heroines. Their names are often allegorised.

Pre-war fashion photographs are an inspiration to the artist.

Leśniak is interested in the values observed by society, especially women, in the past—honor, integrity and homeland. The women Leśniak portrays are independent, strong, fearless, ready-to-act, virtuous, in no way inferior to men.

Leśniak is also interested in issues to do with gender, the body, definitions of femininity and perceptions of women.

== Scholarships / awards ==
2002

Scholarship in Staatliche Akademie der Bildenden Künste, Stuttgart

2004

Diploma with honors. Academy of Fine Arts in Lodz

2011

Scholarship of Minister of Culture and National Heritage

2015

Scholarship of President of the City of Lodz for people involved in artistic creation and culture animation

2016

Scholarship KulturKontakt, Vienna, Austria and Scholarship Cultural Cities of Gdansk

== Selected exhibitions and projects ==
=== Individual exhibitions ===
2005

- AKTywistki Gallery In Blanco, BOK, Lodz
- AKTualności, Academic Hub of Creative Initiatives, Lodz

2007

- Printemps czyli Wiosna w Domku Ogrodnika, initiative and video-art from the cycle Body Printing, Patio Art Center, Lodz
- Primavera czyli Wiosna w Gabinecie Grohmana, initiative from the cycle Body Printing Museum of the Artistic Books, Lodz
- Body Printing Studio STUDIO BWA, Wroclaw

2008

- Body Printing - Installation from the series Presentations of contemporary art, Academic Center for Artistic Initiative, Lodz
- Piękne i BESTie multimedia project, Ateneum Gallery, Warsaw

2009

- Nie o to chodzi, by złapać króliczka, lecz by gonić go, Patio Art Center, Lodz
- TOP Models, Studio Gallery, Palace of Culture, Warsaw

2010

- Fading Traces, Polskie Artystki w sztuce lat 70, /Fokus Łódź Biennale 2010/ Manhattan Gallery, Lodz
- Body of Art, Newest Art Gallery, Gorzów Wielkopolski
- Muzy Łodzi Kaliskiej, Atlas of Art, Łódź
- Body Printing Epicentrum, Epicentrum Gallery, Jastrzębie Zdrój

2011

- Zarejestrowane, Galeria ON, Poznań
- Fading Traces, Polskie Artystki w sztuce lat 70, Galeria ON, Poznań
- Fading Traces, Polskie Artystki w sztuce lat 70, Lokal_30, Warszawa

2012

- Zarejestrowane, Museum of Cinematography Lodz
- Zarejestrowane, Entropia Gallery, Wroclaw

2014

- Taniec Bociana, as part of the project Relokacje, Bydgoszcz
- Wcielenia, BWA Olsztyn
- Herstory, meeting, demonstration of documentation, Gdnńsk City Gallery, Gdansk

2015

- Invisible inVisible, Wschodnia Gallery, Lodz
- Fifi Zastrow. Acta est fabula, installation in public space, ul. Jaracza 34, Lodz
- Michalina zuch dziewczyna, installation in public space, ul. Zachodnia 27A, Lodz
- Eugenia żeni się installation in public space, ul. Drukarska 2, Lodz

2016

- Invisible inVisible / Niewidzialne Widzialnego, Gdansk City Gallery, Gdansk
- Zastrzegam sobie wyłączne posiadanie swego życia, installation inspired by a character Stanisława Przybyszewska, Plac Wałowy 13, Gdansk
- patRIOTki, XX1 Gallery, Warsaw

2017

- INNE - Invisible inVisible / Niewidzialne Widzialnego, Wozownia Gallery, Toruń
- Dla Zofii / Kwiat dla Zofii, site-specific artwork in public space, Main Train Station in Leszno

=== Group exhibitions ===
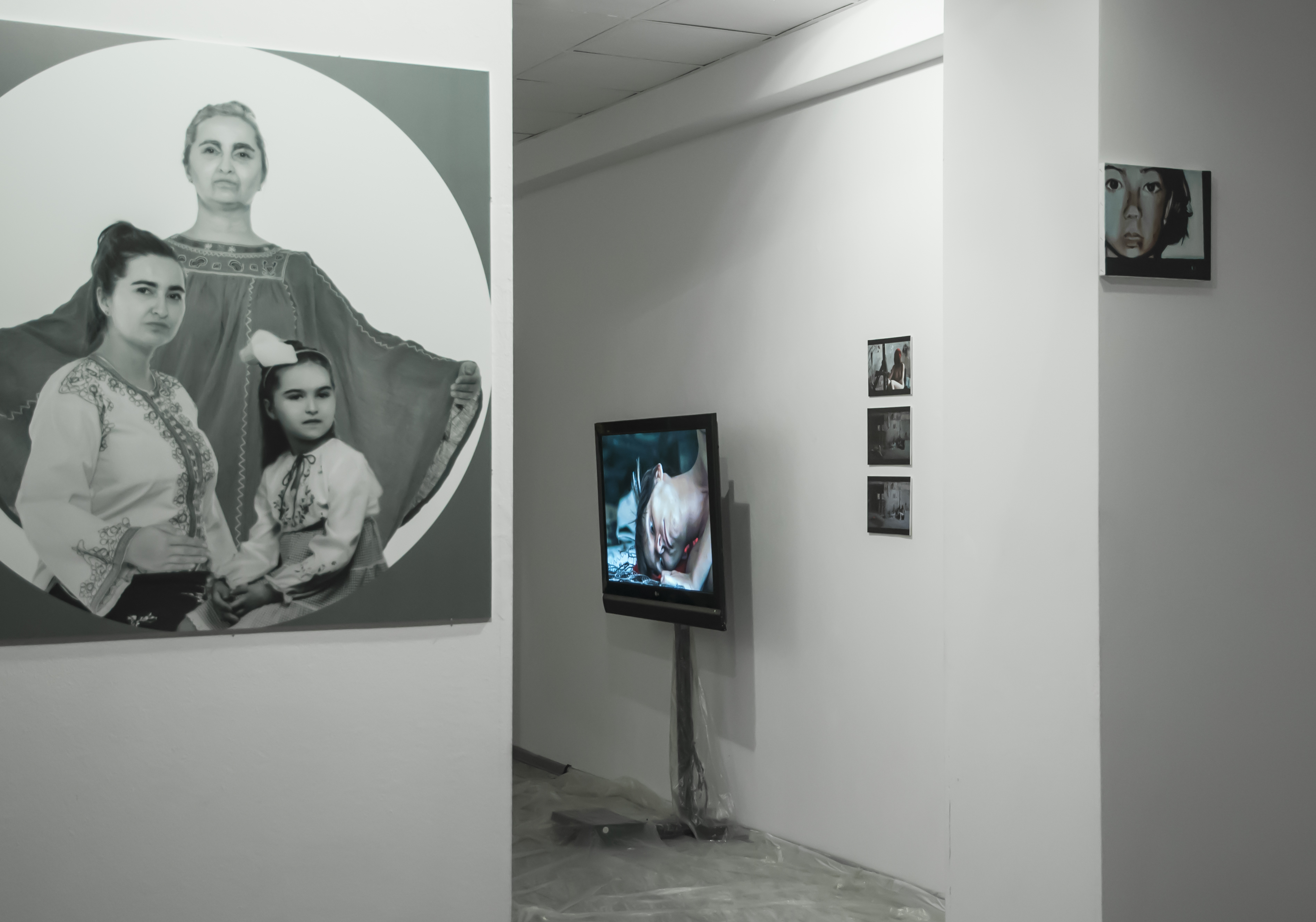
Fragment of exhibition in Lodz from the group 'Frakcja'

2005

- Yearbook 2004, exhibition of the best diplomas of the Academy of Fine Arts in Łódź, Central Museum of Textiles, Lodz
- International Film Festival Offensiva, Wroclaw
- Akt-Reaktywacja, exhibition of works by graduates of the Drawing and Painting Workshop ad. Włodzimierz Stelmaszczyk, Forum Gallery, Downtown Cultural Forum, Lodz

2006

- Young Art Fair, project Ptasie Radio, Toruń
- II Artistic Meetings Aspekty: Pokolenie Porno, Bed Art - audiovisual project, Gallery of Young Promotion, BOK, Lodz
- Binary City Lodz - Warsaw, Manhattan Gallery, Lodz

2007

- From Warsaw to Lodz, Manhattan Gallery, Lodz
- Homeless Gallery, Tolerance - Intolerance, Patio Art Center, Lodz
- Visual Education, a jubilee exhibition of the work of graduates of the Department of Visual Education at the Academy of Fine Arts in Lodz, Museum of the City of Lodz
- Disenchantment, Project in urban space, BWA Zielona Góra

2008

- Disenchantment - a continuous process, BWA Awangarda, Wroclaw
- Sexhibition, Creative Workshop Lubelska, Warsaw
- Prints for Peace, Gallery Lepoldo Carpinteyro de Relaciones Culturales, Monterrey, Mexico

2009

- Passing Through, KunstPunkt, Berlin
- Art after hours, CSW Łaźnia, Gdansk
- 28 days, CCA Łaźnia Gdansk

2010

- Metasurvival. Producers of contexts in the face of change, Gallery Spiż7, Gdansk
- International Art Workshops R.I.V.E.R., Provincia Ancona, Italy

2011

- Registrations, Representations, and membership exhibition of the Art and Documentation Association, East Gallery, Lodz

2012

- PAN ASIA - Performance Art Network Asia, Seoul, Korea
- Ja Lodzermensch, Manhattan Gallery, Lodz
- Transart Communication Festival, Koszyce, Slovakia
- Silesia Art Biennale
- Ephemeral Fixed. Ephemeral art - history documented. Ephemeral art in the Visegrad countries. Wschodnia Gallery, Lodz
- 2nd Member Exhibition of the Art and Documentation Association, Wschodnia Gallery, Lodz

2013

- Live Galleries, Wschodnia Gallery, Exchange Gallery. Lodz Networks since 1978. Maerz Kunstlervereinigung, Linz, Austria
- No Women No Art, Poznań. Podejrzana project in the urban space of Wild's veneration
- Name of the Father? Name of the Mother! exhibition of Polish and Korean artists, Gardener's House, Park Źródliska, Lodz
- 3rd Member Exhibition of the Art and Documentation Association, Wschodnia Gallery, Lodz

2014

- Dzieci z Fabryki / Reborn Babies, Play Poland Film Festival, Meow photography studios, Edinburgh, Scotland
- We+Our+Us, Bupyeong Arts Center, Incheon / Tongyeong Citizen's Centre, Tongyeong, South Korea
- Getto XXI, exhibition accompanying the celebration of the 70th anniversary of liquidation Litzmannstadt Getto, Monopolis, Lodz
- 4th Member Exhibition of the Art and Documentation Association, Wschodnia Gallery, Lodz

2015

- What do I have from a woman?, Visual Culture Research Center, Kijów, Ukraine
- Punkty Styczne, exhibition of PhD students at the Academy of Fine Arts in Gdansk, The Baltic Sea Cultural Center, Center of St. John, Gdansk
- Rozpakować walizki/Koffer auspacken, Koelmann Höfe Factory, Frankfurt on the Oder, Germany
- V Wystawa członkowska Stowarzyszenia Sztuka i Dokumentacja, Wschodnia Gallery, Lodz

2016

- Transcultural Emancipation, Fluc, Vienna
- 6 Member Exhibition of the Art and Documentation Association, Wschodnia Gallery, Lodz

2017

- re_form OSTRALE BIENNALE, Drezno, Germany
- Weź Szminkę / Take a lipstick, performance as part of an experiment project FUNom, Wozownia Gallery, Toruń
- Kobiety, które siedzą w Łodzi, group exhibition FRAKCJA, Manhattan Transfer Gallery, Lodz

2018

- Gniazdo / The Nest, Aula Gallery.Academy of Fine Arts in Gdansk
- Tylko jeden dzień. Manifest Obceności performance of group FRAKCJA, Fashon House Limanka, Lodz
- 7 exhibition of members and members of the Art and Documentation Association, Wschodnia Gallery, Lodz
