= Berthier (surname) =

Berthier is a surname. Notable people with the surname include:

- Alexandre Berthier (1638–1708), French officer posted to Canada
- Clément Berthier (born 2000), French para table tennis player
- Ferdinand Berthier (1803–1886), French writer, educator, and advocate for societal inclusion of those experiencing Deafness
- Guillaume-François Berthier (1704–1782), Jesuit writer
- Jacques Berthier (1923–1994), Taizé composer
- Jacques Berthier (1916 – 2008), French actor
- Jean-Marie Berthier (1940 - 8 August 2017), French poet
- Louis-Alexandre Berthier (1753–1815), Marshal of France under Napoleon
- Pierre Berthier (1782–1861), geologist
