= Jim Blount =

American newspaper editor and historian

- Born: James L. Blount; June 4, 1935; Hamilton, Ohio, U.S.
- Died: August 22, 2017 (aged 82); Hamilton, Ohio, U.S.
- Spouse: Jackie Steigerwalt (m. 1958)

James L. Blount (June 4, 1935 – August 22, 2017) was an American newspaper editor and historian. Blount was editor of the Hamilton Journal-News, the daily newspaper in Hamilton, Ohio and wrote extensively on the history of Hamilton and Butler County, Ohio.

== Biography ==
Blount was born June 4, 1935, in Hamilton, Ohio, the oldest of the five children of James and Julia (Mignerey) Blount. He graduated from Hamilton High School in 1953 and earned a B.S. in Education from the University of Cincinnati, and an M.A. in history from Miami University. He began his career in journalism at The Cincinnati Enquirer. He was hired by the Hamilton Journal-News in 1963. Blount was editor of the paper from 1971 to 1986. He wrote a weekly column on local history in the Journal News from 1988 to 2004.

He left the newspaper to become a high school history teacher in 1986.

Blount was an advocate for road improvements in Butler County. He served on the board of directors of the Butler County Transportation Improvement District from 1994 until his death.

Blount married Jackie Steigerwalt on December 27, 1958. They had two children, Brian and Lori.

Blount died in Hamilton, Ohio on August 22, 2017, at the age of 82.

== Bibliography ==
- Blount, Jim (1994). Champion: 100 Years of Papermaking in Hamilton, Ohio. Hamilton, Ohio: Champion International Corporation. ASIN B0006P7HIW.
- Blount, Jim (1998). The Civil War and Butler County. Hamilton, Ohio: Past/Present/Press. ASIN B0006QYGGC.
- Blount, Jim; Crout, George; Shriver, Phillip R. (2000). The 1900s: 100 Years in the History of Butler County, Ohio. Hamilton, Ohio: Past/Present/Press. ASIN B0006RH2IU.
- Blount, Jim (2001). Butler County Biographies. Hamilton, Ohio: Past/Present/Press. ASIN B0006RS9NM.
- Blount, Jim (2002). Flood : Butler County's greatest weather disaster - March 1913. Hamilton, Ohio: Past/Present/Press. ASIN B0006RZLOW.
- Blount, Jim (2006). Fort Hamilton Diary: The St. Clair Campaign, people, places & events in the 1791 conflict in the Old Northwest. Shandon and Hamilton, Ohio: Past/Present/Press.
- Blount, Jim (2011). Fernald, a brief history.
