= Hashem El Madani =

Lebanese photographer

Hashem El Madani (1928 – 8 August 2017) was a Lebanese photographer. During his 50-year career he produced over 75,000 images and photographed 90% of Sidon's inhabitants.

== Early life ==
Madani was born in Sidon to a Saudi father from Madina, who was sent to Sidon as a representative of the Islamic Awqaf and his mother was Lebanese from Sidon. Madani opened his photography studio, Studio Shehrazade, in 1953.
