= Hélène Martini =

French theater director (1924-2017)

- Hélène Martini
- Born: 6 August 1924; Poland
- Died: 5 August 2017 (aged 92)
- Occupation: businesswoman

Hélène de Cressac Martini (6 August 1924 – 5 August 2017) was a Polish-born French striptease artist turned businesswoman and nightclub owner associated with the Folies Bergère, and nicknamed "The Countess" and "The Empress of the Night".

The Polish-born (present-day Belarus) Martini landed in Paris aged 20 after surviving the Holocaust. She was believed to be the sole surviving member of her family. Starting out at the Folies Bergere, she won three million francs on the lottery. She then went on to employ her managerial and entrepreneurial skills to run half a dozen Paris nightclubs, first with her Syria-born husband, Nachat Martini, a lawyer, professor and secret agent (1910–1961), whom she married in 1955. After his death in early 1961, she carried on alone. The couple had no children. She died in 2017, on the day before her 93rd birthday, leaving no known living relatives.

== Biography ==
She was born Hélène de Creyssac to a French father, a landowner in Poland, and a Russian mother.

With her supposed sister Alice de Creyssac (actually her girlfriend), she arrived in France in 1945, after her family had been decimated by World War II and after she had nearly been killed by a Soviet officer in Königsberg. She did odd jobs in the provinces and then became a nude model at the Folies Bergère in Paris. She won nearly three million francs in the lottery.

She met Nachat Martini, known as “The Lebanese,” a wealthy lawyer of Syrian origin. They married in 1955 and bought cabarets in Pigalle, Paris: the Folies-Pigalle, the Sphinx, and the Narcisse.

Her husband died in 1960 of a heart attack. Hélène was his sole heir, despite legal action brought by the deceased's two brothers.

She continued in the business and acquired four Parisian theaters (Théâtre des Bouffes-Parisiens, Théâtre Mogador, Comédie de Paris, Folies Bergère), as well as cabaret clubs (Le Raspoutine on Rue de Bassano and Le Shéhérazade). Over the years, she sold off her assets, eventually selling the Folies Bergère in 2011.

She abandoned the Pigalle neighborhood, which she felt had changed too much. In 2013, she stated: “The real Pigalle no longer exists,” and “Today, Pigalle is sad, it's nothing.”

In his book New Moon, café de nuit joyeux (2017), dedicated to one of his cabarets, David Dufresne reveals that Hélène Martini associated with the far right, notably with one of the leaders of the Organisation armée secrète.

The New Moon, an annex of the Narcisse on Rue Pigalle, a famous rock concert venue in the 1980s and 1990s, was extorted by the Marseillais and destroyed.

Hélène Martini died on August 5, 2017, in Paris, at the age of 92. A religious ceremony was held at Alexander Nevsky Cathedral, Paris. She was buried in the Thiais cemetery in Paris alongside her husband.
