= Roland P. Hofemann =

American politician

Member of the New Hampshire House of Representatives from the Strafford 69th district
- In office 2002–2004

Member of the New Hampshire House of Representatives from the Strafford 6th district
- In office 2004–2012

Personal details
- Born: February 25, 1934
- Died: August 27, 2017 (aged 83)
- Party: Democratic

Roland P. Hofemann (February 25, 1934 – August 27, 2017) was an American politician. He served as a Democratic member for the Strafford 6th and 69th district of the New Hampshire House of Representatives.
