= Romdhan Chatta =

Tunisian actor (1939–2017)

- رمضان شطا
- Born: 25 November 1939; Bekalta, Tunisia
- Died: 9 August 2017 (aged 77)
- Occupation: Actor
- Notable work: Al moutamarred

Romdhan Chatta (25 November 1939 – 9 August 2017) was a Tunisian actor.

Originally from the Sahel region, Chatta was primarily known for his role of Hmidetou in the television series Mhal Chahed in the 1970s, alongside the actress Dalenda Abdou.

During his four decades of career, he played several successful roles such as that of the teacher in the play Maréchal Amma , a Tunisian adaptation of Le Bourgeois gentilhomme of Molière, or as Tijani Kalcita in El Khottab Al Bab, soap opera of the 1990s.

He died on 9 August 2017.

== Actor ==
| Year | Title | Role | Notes |
|---|---|---|---|
| 1968 | Al moutamarred | | |
| 1973 | Fi Bilad Ettararanni | | |
| 1996–1997 | El Khottab Al Bab | (Suitors are on the door) by Slaheddine Essid, Ali Louati and Moncef Baldi : Tijani Kalsita (Guest Honor of episodes 1, 2, 7, 9, 11, 12, 13, 14 and 15 of season 1 and one of the main actors of season 2) | |
