= Ke Jun =

Chinese metallurgist

- Born: 23 June 1917; Changchun, Jilin, China
- Died: 8 August 2017 (aged 100); Beijing, China
- Education: Wuhan University; University of Birmingham
- Scientific career
- Fields: Metallurgy; History of science and technology
- Workplaces: University of Science and Technology Beijing
- Doctoral advisor: Daniel Hanson

Ke Jun (Chinese: 柯俊; pinyin: Ke Jun; Wade–Giles: K'o Chün; 23 June 1917 – 8 August 2017) was a Chinese metallurgist who specialized in forming bainite. He was elected the Chinese Academy of Sciences academician in 1980. Born in 1917, Ke graduated from the Chemistry Department of Wuhan University in 1938. He gained his doctorate degree at the University of Birmingham in Britain in 1948. He died in Beijing on 8 August 2017 at the age of 100.
