= Mohamed Refaat El-Saeed =

Egyptian politician and scholar

- محمد رفعت السعيد

General Secretary of the National Progressive Unionist Party (Tagammu)

Member of the Shura Council
- Incumbent
- Assumed office 1995

Personal details
- Born: October 11, 1932
- Died: August 17, 2017 (aged 84)
- Party: National Progressive Unionist Party (Tagammu)
- Occupation: Politician, scholar, writer
- Known for: Leftist political leadership; opposition to the Muslim Brotherhood; prolific writings

Mohammed Refaat El-Saeed (Arabic: محمد رفعت السعيد Muhammad Rifaʻatu s-Saʻīd, 11 October 1932 – 17 August 2017) was an Egyptian politician, scholar, and writer. He served as the general secretary of the National Progressive Unionist Party (Tagammu). El-Saeed held two doctorates in history, and was a part-time lecturer at the American University in Cairo. El-Saeed was a frequent contributor to al-Ahali, the Tagammu party organ.

== Career ==
During the 1940s and 1950s, El-Saeed was active in the Democratic Movement for National Liberation (Haditu) and was seen as close to the leader of the movement, Henri Curiel. He was arrested in the 1958 crackdown on communist activities, and would spend four years in jail.

When the Tagammu party was founded, El-Saeed served as its organizational secretary. Within Tagammu, El-Saeed was identified with the tendency that he was willing to enter into compromises with the regime of Hosni Mubarak. Notably, under his leadership Tagammu was the sole opposition party not to boycott the 1990 election. In early 1995 Tagammu accepted the presidential nomination of El-Saeed to the Shura Council, the upper house of parliament.

For El-Saeed, the tactical alliance with Mubarak stemmed from a desire to block the Muslim Brotherhood to advance its influence in Egyptian politics. El-Saeed's consistent fierce opposition to the Muslim Brotherhood constitutes a key component of his political discourse and authorship. He dedicated many of his written works to this subject (such as Contre L'Integrisme Islamiste in French). In response to his line on political Islam, he was placed in prominent positions on the death lists of militant groups.

Within Tagammu, El-Saeed remained a controversial figure due to his links to Mubarak. Some sectors of the party disagreed with his hardline stance against the Muslim Brotherhood. Dissent in the party erupted again following the 2011 Egyptian Revolution, as 73 Central Committee members of the party resigned in protest of El-Saeed's leadership. In particular the participation of Tagammu in the 2010 elections was a bone of contention.

== Death ==
El-Saeed died on 17 August 2017 at the age of 84.
