= Jerry Roberts (American football) =

American football player and coach (1940–2017)

Biographical details
- Born: April 28, 1940
- Died: August 17, 2017 (aged 77); Altoona, Pennsylvania, U.S.

Playing career
- 1959–1962: Lock Haven

Coaching career (HC unless noted)
- 1980: Saint Francis (PA)

Head coaching record
- Overall: 2–7

Jerome S. Roberts (April 28, 1940 – August 17, 2017) was an American football player and coach. He served as the head football coach at Saint Francis University in Loretto, Pennsylvania for one season, in 1980, compiling a record of 2–7. Roberts played college football at Lock Haven University of Pennsylvania from 1959 to 1962.

== Head coaching record ==
Year	Team	Overall	Conference	Standing	Bowl/playoffs
Saint Francis Red Flash (NCAA Division III independent) (1980)
1980	Saint Francis	2–7			
Saint Francis:		2–7			
Total:		2–7			
