= Glenn J. Lesniak =

United States Army general (born 1954)

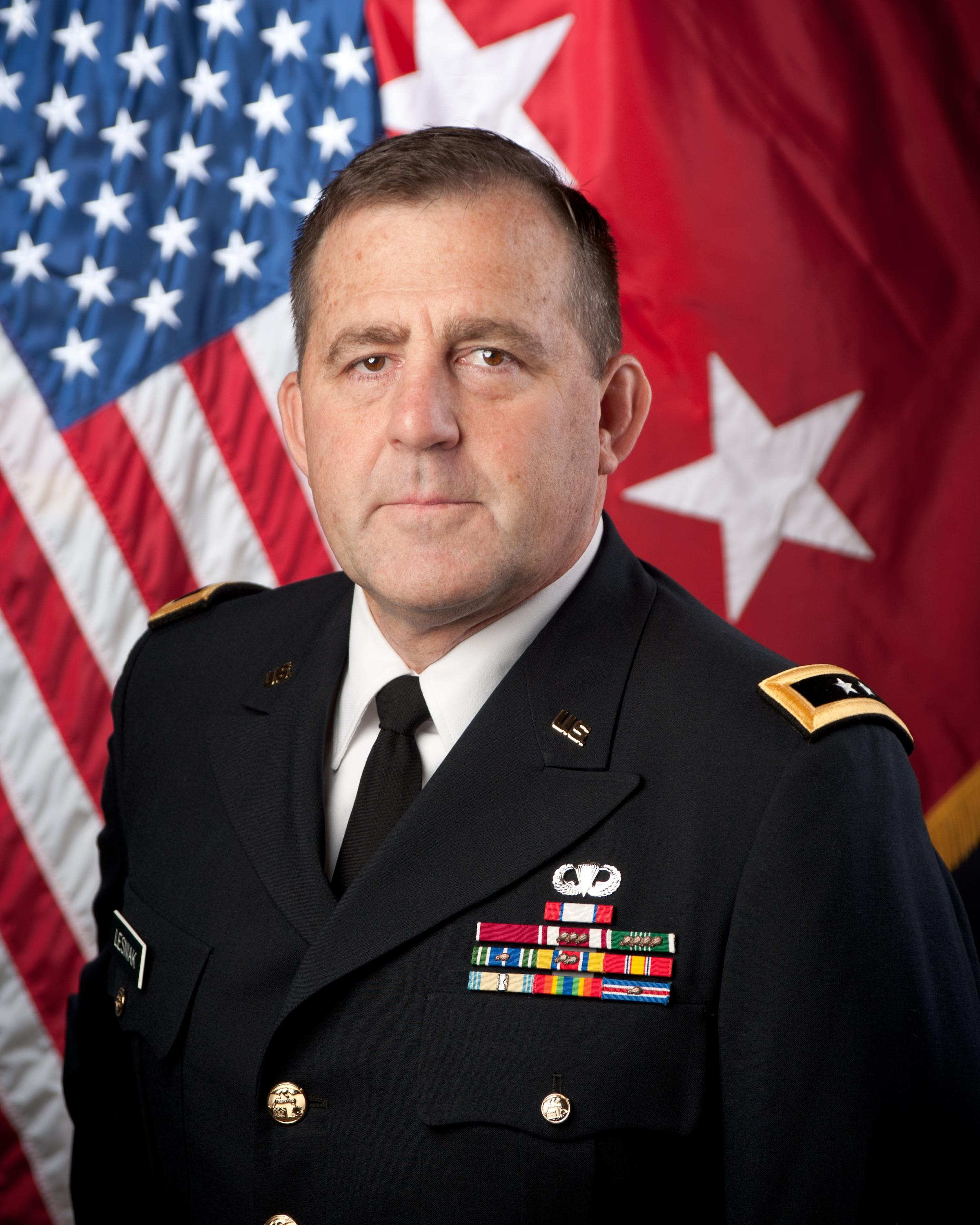
- Born: September 2, 1954 (age 72); New Jersey, U.S.
- Military career
- Allegiance: United States
- Branch: United States Army Reserve
- Service years: 1976–2015
- Rank: Major General
- Commands: Deputy Commanding General (Support)
- Awards: Distinguished Service Medal (3); Legion of Merit

Glenn Jeffrey Lesniak (born September 2, 1954) is a retired major general who served as deputy commanding general for support of the United States Army Reserve.

== Career ==
After graduation from the United States Military Academy in 1976, his first assignment was at Fort Belvoir in Fairfax County, Virginia. In 1982, after serving at Fort Leonard Wood in Pulaski County, Missouri, he was named assistant professor of Military Science at the University of Connecticut. After transferring to the United States Army Reserve in 1984, Lesniak was assigned to Fort Sam Houston in San Antonio, Texas. He later served at Caven Point in Jersey City, New Jersey, and Fort Dix in Burlington County, New Jersey, as well as in Brooklyn, New York, Kingston, New York and New Windsor, New York.

As BG, he commanded the 94th RRC at Fort Devens Mass. From 2007 until Base Realignment and Closure Commission restructure forced the folding of its flag in 2008 after 90 years in New England.

In 2008, Lesniak was named Deputy Commander of the 81st Regional Support Command at Fort Jackson in Columbia, South Carolina. He held this position until 2009, when he was named Commanding General of the 88th Regional Support Command and Senior Commander at Fort McCoy in Monroe County, Wisconsin.

In 2012, MG Lesniak was assigned as the Deputy Commanding General-Support, US Army Reserve Command at Ft Bragg, North Carolina. In 2014 he was assigned as the Deputy Chief of the US Army Reserve at the Pentagon. He retired after over 39 years of service in September 2015.

He has been awarded the Distinguished Service Medal with two oak leaf clusters, the Legion of Merit, the Meritorious Service Medal with three oak leaf clusters, the Army Commendation Medal with four oak leaf clusters, the Army Achievement Medal with oak leaf cluster and the Army Reserve Components Overseas Training Ribbon. In addition, he is authorized to wear the Parachutist Badge.

== Education ==
- B.S., General Engineering – United States Military Academy
- M.S., Engineering Management – University of Missouri–Rolla
- M.S., Strategic Studies – United States Army War College
