= Maurade Glennon =

Irish-born American writer and teacher

Deirdre Maura Darrouzet (née Glennon; January 5, 1926 – August 15, 2017), better known as Maurade Glennon, was an Irish-born American writer and teacher who lived in Texas.

Glennon was born in Birr, Ireland, and received her early schooling at the Convent of Mercy in her hometown. She attended the Dominican College in Dublin from 1941 to 1943, St. Edward's University in Austin, Texas from 1959 to 1960, and University of Texas from 1961 to 1964. She has worked as a teacher and served on the board of directors of Austin Community Nursery Schools from 1963 to 1969.

Glennon began her writing career with short stories. Her debut work, "From Dublin's Fair City", won first prize in Mademoiselle's short story contest in 1964. Her works have appeared in several anthologies. She has published two novels, No More Septembers (1968) and The Waiting Time (1971).

Her papers are held at the Howard Gotlieb Archival Research Center at Boston University.

Glennon married Jacques "Jack" P. Darrouzet, and resided in Austin, Texas. She died at home on August 15, 2017, at the age of 91.
