= Yossi Beinart =

Israeli economist

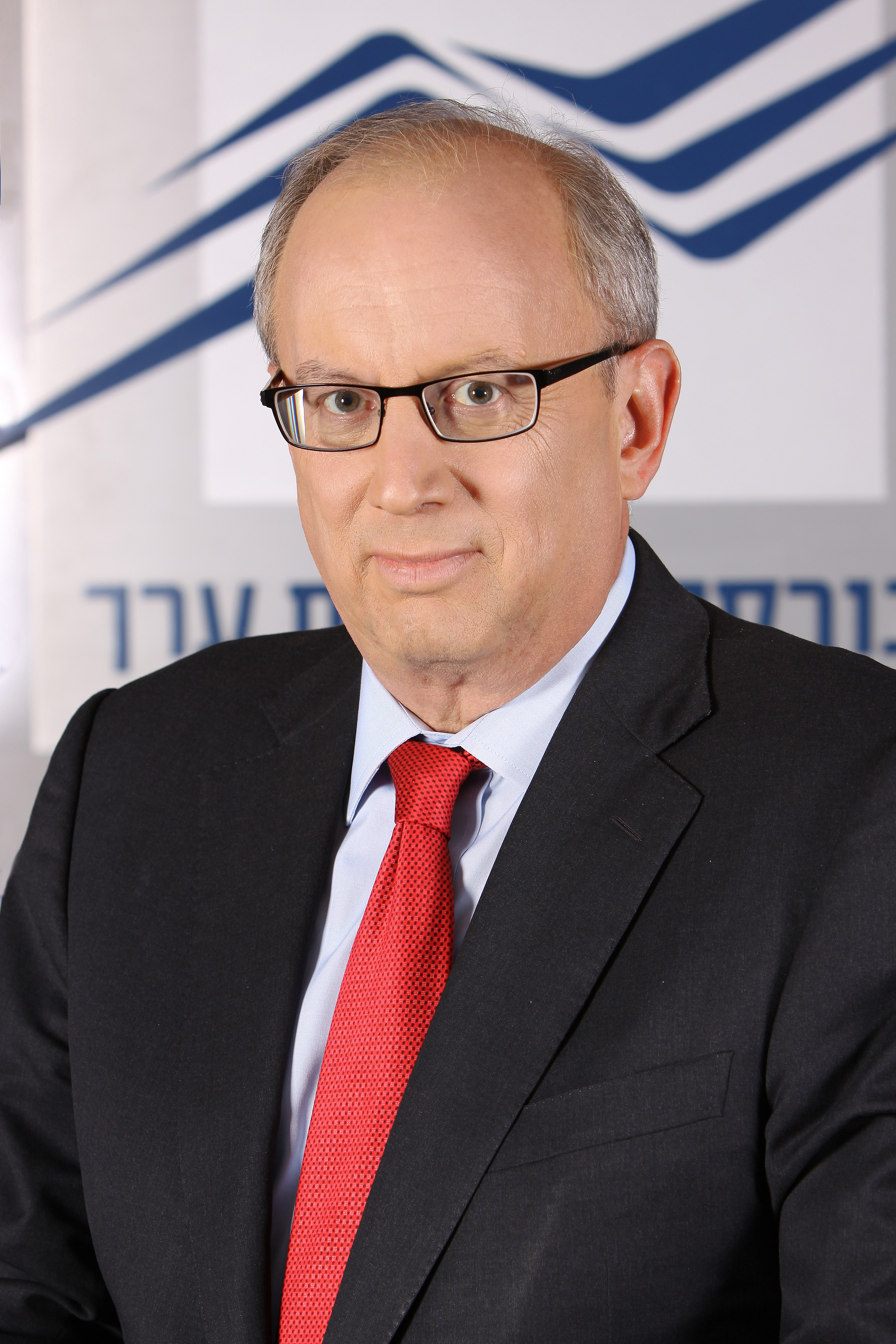
Yossi Beinart in 2014.

Yossi Beinart (Hebrew: יוסי ביינרט; 1956 – 2017) was CEO of the Tel Aviv Stock Exchange, from 2014 until his death in 2017.

== Early life and education ==
Beinart was born in Jerusalem, the son of Hebrew University historian Haim Beinart. He served in the Israel Defense Forces, where he was promoted to lieutenant colonel. He graduated from Hebrew University in 1985, with a degree in Computer Science.
