= Harry Haureliuk =

- Professional bodybuilder
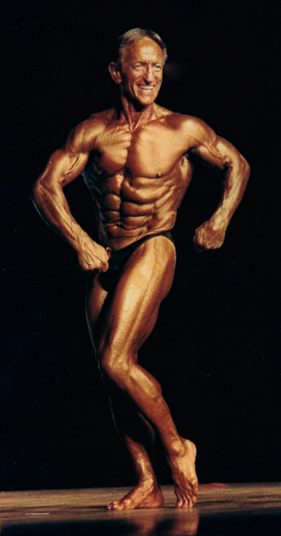
- Harry 2003 Mr NSW

Personal info
- Nickname: Hang-Ten, HGH
- Born: 24 May 1947; Austria
- Died: 20 August 2017 (aged 70)

Best statistics
- Height: 1.62 m (5 ft 4 in)
- Weight: Contest: 62 kg (137 lb), Off season: 70 kg (150 lb)

Professional (Pro) career
- Pro-debut: 1999 International Natural Bodybuilding Association; 1999
- Best win: INBA 5x Mr. Olympia INBA 4x Mr. Universe; Harry Haureliuk — Bodybuilder — Harry 2003 Mr NSWPersonal infoNickname Hang-Ten, HGHBorn (1947-05-24)24 May 1947AustriaHeight 1.62 m (5 ft 4 in) Weight Contest: 62 kg (137 lb), Off season: 70 kg (150 lb) Professional careerPro-debut 1999 International Natural Bodybuilding Association, 1999Best win INBA 5x Mr. OlympiaINBA 4x Mr. Universe, Active Since 1999
- Active: Since 1999

Harry "Hang-Ten" George Haureliuk (24 May 1947 – 20 August 2017) was an Australian professional Bodybuilding champion competing under the International Natural Bodybuilding Association (INBA). In 2008, Harry was the first Australian recipient to be inducted into the International Bodybuilding Hall of Fame, no other INBA athlete has competed at such a high level.

Harry travelled nationally and internationally competing on the Natural Body Building Circuit and holds many titles including the Mr Universe and Mr Olympia titles. Harry won six Mr Olympias, four Mr Universes and two Mr World titles in the space of 15 years from 1999 to 2013, an unrivaled career in bodybuilding and a true statement that age is just a number. In 2013, Haureliuk received the Lifetime Achievement Award in Body Building in Las Vegas at the Mr. Olympia competition. Harry Haureliuk was the first competitor to compete on the international level of bodybuilding for 15 consecutive years.

Harry left bodybuilding in 2013 after being invited to get involved with powerlifting by his old "apprentice", Brett Kirchner.

In the Australian masters powerlifting championships from 5 to 7 August 2016, Haureliuk won the 66 kg class powerlifting. In the same category, Haureliuk also won the bench press competition. Haureliuk broke the Australian Squad record by 5 kg with a lift of 140 kg. Haureliuk was awarded the best lifter in the master III division.

== Biography ==
Harry first began lifting weights at the early age of 12 and his passion for bodybuilding has since seen him win numerous awards both nationally and internationally. In 1974, Harry began competing professionally and won runner up in the NSW title in his first competition as a novice. Harry retired from competitions in 1986, quoted saying "mainly because of the additional substances people were taking".

Harry Haureliuk moved to Queanbeyan with his Austrian parents at age three, after World War II. He took up weights in his early teens and just missed out on qualifying for Australia in weightlifting for the 1964 Tokyo Olympics. He then turned into bodybuilding. Haureliuk gave up competitive bodybuilding temporarily in the 1980s because of the frustration by the rampant use of steroids by other competitors. Haureliuk took bodybuilding up again in the late-90s when natural bodybuilding competitions emerged.

After reflecting on photos of himself during a trip to the beach with his daughter in late 1998, Harry appeared to be overweight for his height. This along with the new introduction of the natural competition sparked a comeback to the Bodybuilding circuit. Competing in his first Natural Bodybuilding competition in May, 1999 Harry weighed in at 72 kg. It was not until his return in 1999 that Harry began to make a significant impact to the Bodybuilding scene, winning five Mr Olympia and four Mr Universe titles. Returning to Bodybuilding was not an easy task, having to obey to a strict regime of training every day for at least an hour and focusing on different body parts in each session.

Day	Body Part
Mon	Chest & back
Tue	Shoulders, Triceps & Upper Abs
Wed	Legs, Biceps & Lower Abs
Thu	Rest
Fri	Chest & Back
Sat	Shoulders & Arms
Sun	Legs & Abs

== Personal life ==
Harry Haureliuk gained a lot of support and motivation from his wife and family. He was married to his wife, Mary on 13 August 1999). Harry had two daughters, Leanne and Elisha and one son, Richard He worked at the Southern Cross Health Club (SCHC), Canberra Australia, as a Physical Culture Consultant and Personal Trainer helping to train others who share his passion for body building. When not competing on the Bodybuilding circuit, Harry liked to indulge in beer, pizza and ice cream.

Harry died suddenly on 20 August 2017.

== Achievements ==
- 2016 Australian Powerlifting: The Best Lifter in the Master III division.
- 2013 International Lifetime Achievement in Bodybuilding
- 2013 Mr. World-Ultra Masters Men
- 2012 Mr. Olympia-Natural (O/60)
- 2009 Master (O/60) Mr Australia, ACT
- 2008 Master (O/60) Mr Australia, ACT
- 2007 Mr ACT
- 2007 Mr Australia
- 2007 Mr NSW
- 2005 Mr NSW
- 2005 Mr Olympia
- 2004 Mr Olympia
- 2003 Mr World
- 2002 Mr Olympia
- 2002 Mr Universe
- 2001 Mr Mr Universe
- 2001 Mr Olympia
- 2000 Mr Olympia
- 1999 Mr Universe
