= Sam Dryden =

Sam Dryden (February 9, 1950 – August 10, 2017) was a thought leader and advocate for food and nutrition security, with a particular focus on small-holder farmer led agricultural development in Africa and Asia. Lately Dryden was a Fellow at Imperial College, working on a project to promote digital technologies that can catalyse sustainable agricultural transformation across the food system in Africa.

Dryden led the Bill and Melinda Gates Foundation's Agricultural Development strategy, making it the largest funding program along with polio, and re-oriented the program to focus on pro-poor staple crops, women farmers and local institutions. Dryden's appointment was seen as controversial, but his leadership and vision to promote pro-poor agricultural development interventions, linked with nutrition and women's empowerment, were lauded by critics and supporters, and earned him the Hunger Hero Award from the UN Secretary General Ban Ki Moon on the nomination of World Food Programme.

Prior to the Gates Foundation, Dryden had a distinguished track record as an investor and developer of life-sciences ventures with extensive expertise in the scale-up and commercialization of early-stage agricultural technologies worldwide, as well as public-private partnerships like being the private sector representative in the Consultative Group for International Agricultural Research (CGIAR). Sylvia Mathews Burwell, President of the Global Development Program at the Gates Foundation, summed up Dryden's track record:

"Sam brings a wealth of experience to the foundation—not only in agriculture, research, and business, but also in a wide variety of projects related to agricultural development and public-private partnerships."

Dryden used to be Managing Director of Wolfensohn & Company, a private investment and advisory firm founded by James Wolfensohn, former President of the World Bank. There he focused primarily on private equity investments in alternative energies. Until June 2006, he served as the Chair and Corporate CEO of Emergent Genetics, Inc. — a global leader in the development and marketing of biotechnology-enhanced seed products. Emergent Genetics' operations were based in Europe, the United States, Argentina and Brazil, and comprised one of the largest seed companies in India. The majority of the company was acquired in April 2005 by the Monsanto Company and its remaining operations were acquired in June 2006 by Syngenta AG. Prior to that Dryden had worked across the world in various capacities; he began his career at the Bureau of Economic Analysis.

== Biography ==
A native of Mount Olivet in eastern Kentucky, he was born February 9, 1950. Dryden grew up on a small farm and went to Mason County High School. His parents- Hazel Lamb (Richardson) and Ray Nelson Dryden Sr. hosted volunteers, who were part of the Great Society programs, and one of them convinced Dryden to enroll in university. Dryden took on the advice, going to Maysville Community College in Maysville, KY for two years, before joining Emory University where he received his B.A. degree in economics 1973. (Dryden sponsors students who graduate from his hometown to go to college under the Hazel Dryden scholarship programme.)

He began his career as an Analyst with the US Department of Commerce's Bureau of Economic Analysis, with responsibilities for modeling and forecasting selected sectors of the US economy. He was then employed by the Union Carbide Corporation from 1974 to 1980, with responsibilities for various aspects of new corporate ventures.f12c0d1a-88af-11e0-806a-001cc4c03286.html These transactions involved extended assignments in Japan, Europe, and South America.

In 1980, Dryden led the spin-out of Union Carbide's biotechnologies and related business operations and was subsequently co-founder, President and CEO of Agrigenetics Corporation. The company grew to become one of the world's largest seed enterprises and was acquired in 1985 - it is now part of Dow AgroSciences. During this same period, he was also chairman of an affiliated partnership which managed and invested $60 million in proprietary plant sciences research conducted in leading universities, as well as private and public research institutions worldwide.

Dryden had a strong interest in music, culture and films, and was married to acclaimed documentary maker and director, Sandy McLeod. He died of multiple systems atrophy on August 10, 2017, at the age of 67.

== Business ventures ==
Following the sale of Agrigenetics, Dryden founded and was President of Big Stone Inc. — a private venture-investment and development company focused on the life sciences. The firm participated in founding over a dozen companies in areas such as biopesticides, novel nucleic acid-based therapeutics and diagnostic products, transgenic animals, fermentation based production of vitamins, pharmaceutical clinical trialing, environmental toxicological testing and bio therapeutics. He also served as the non-executive chairman of Celgro Inc., an independent venture of Celgene Corporation, a company focused on the development of novel, single-isomer, agricultural chemical compounds.

== Public sector activities ==
In addition to his for-profit activities, Dryden has extensive pro-bono involvement in efforts relating to agriculture, food security, nutrition and international economic development.

At the Bill and Melinda Gates Foundation, in his role as director of the Agricultural Development Strategy, he helped develop a new strategic vision focused on pro-poor staple crops and small-holder farmers. The Guardian named him the most powerful figure in global agriculture, since under his leadership the Gates Foundation prioritized agriculture at the same level as its global health efforts, increasing annual payout to $400 million per year from $250 million per year. Dryden's ability to reach out to critics like Pat Mooney and Grist, to explain the Gates Foundation's approach was as crucial as his strategic vision and management experience to reorient the agriculture program. Under his leadership, the Gates Foundation began an intensive engagement to bring the international food and agriculture system in service of increasing small-holder farmer productivity - refer, Bill Gates' Address to IFAD's Governing Council - to achieve the global hunger and poverty goals, as listed in the Millennium Declaration. These efforts helped reform and rejuvenate global institutions, like the CGIAR (which underwent significant reforms and doubled its budget), and the Gates Foundation developed strong partnerships with FAO under its new leader Jose Graziano da Silva, WFP under its new leader Ertharin Cousin, and IFAD under Kanayo Nwanze. The Gates Foundation also made some of its most innovative grants, like Digital Green, One Acre Fund, during Dryden's directorship- he continues this work in his new capacity as Imperial College Fellow to promote digital technologies to improve African food systems by better linking small-holders in the value chain. This work builds on the convening led by Kofi Annan and AU Chair Zuma in Addis Ababa.

He served as a member of the Board of Directors of the Alliance for a Green Revolution in Africa (AGRA), the Global Crop Diversity Trust and served on the National Academies Panel on Science and Technology for Global Sustainability. In the past, he served as an advisor to the World Bank regarding rural development strategy. He also served on the Steering Committee for the Global Assessment on Agricultural Science and Technology, led by the World Bank. He was a member of the Executive Council, as well as chair of the Private Sector Committee, of the Consultative Group on International Agricultural Research. He has been an advisor to the Rockefeller Foundation and a member of the Design Advisory Committee and Scientific Advisory Board of its African Agricultural Technology Foundation — an organization created for the advancement of African food security. In the mid-1980s, he chaired a Rockefeller Brothers Fund development initiative to benefit developing country food security. He also served on the Board of the South/North Development Initiative—a private Rockefeller Family foundation for alleviation of rural poverty in less developed countries through entrepreneurial development. He is a past member of the U.S. Government's Agricultural Sciences and Technology Review Board.

Dryden is a member of the Council on Foreign Relations and serves on its Advisory Committee on Intellectual Property and American Competitiveness. In the past he served on its Study Group analyzing trade issues between the United States and Europe surrounding genetically modified foods.

Dryden has written and lectured widely on the policy issues of food security, the evolving nature of global public goods and new mechanisms for public and private sector relations. In this regard, his travels have taken him on missions to the Middle East, Europe, Asia, Africa, and most countries in Latin America, including Cuba.
