= Neil Smyth =

Australian cricketer

Personal information
- Born: 6 June 1928; Melbourne, Australia
- Died: 14 August 2017 (aged 89); Brighton, Victoria, Australia

Domestic team information
- Years: Team
- 1952-1954: Victoria
- Source: Cricinfo, 7 May 2018

Neil Smyth (6 June 1928 – 14 August 2017) was an Australian cricketer. He played three first-class cricket matches for Victoria between 1952 and 1954 and also played for Prahran Cricket Club.

== See also ==
- List of Victoria first-class cricketers
