= Eugene Hlywa =

Eugene Hlywa (5 December 1925, Nosiv village, now Ternopil Raion, Ternopil region, Ukraine – 6 August 2017 Sydney, Australia) was a psychologist, psychotherapist, hypnotherapist, and public figure.

== Childhood and World War II ==
Eugene Hlywa was born in 1925, in Nosiv village, Ternopil region of Ukraine. His parents, Maria née Lutsiv and Leonid Hlywa, brought up Eugene and his elder brother, Teofil, in the spirit of Ukrainian nationalism that was so symbolic of the Ukrainian conscientious society at the beginning of 20th century. In his teenage years, Eugene Hlywa joined the UPA (Ukrainian Insurgent Army).

During the Second World War as a member of OUN (Organisation of Ukrainian Nationalists), Eugene Hlywa initially performed duties of an ideological advisor, and then of intelligence agent and soldier.

In 1943, Eugene Hlywa was captured by the Nazis. A German military court sentenced him to execution by firing squad, which was to take place within 24 hours. Initially awaiting for his execution in Rzeszów prison, he then was transferred to Dębica detention center and subsequently to Montelupich Prison in Kraków. The death sentence was replaced by incarceration in concentration camps. Eugene Hlywa was an inmate at such ill-famed Nazi concentration camps as: Gross-Rosen, Mauthausen and Ebensee. He was freed from the Ebensee concentration camp on 5 May 1945 along with other inmates by the US army.

Shortly after his release, Eugene returned to his OUN activities. His division was responsible for prevention of Moscow's secret services capturing and forcible exportation of the USSR citizens, who became political prisoners and refugees during the war back to the USSR. In 1947, Yaroslav Stetsko, the OUN and ABN (Anti-Bolshevik Bloc of Nations) leader, entrusted Eugene Hlywa with organising the ABN intelligence division, which he headed until disbanding of ABN in 1996 following the dissolution of the USSR.

Along with political activities, Hlywa continued his education. He studied law and political sciences in the UFU (Ukrainian Free University) in Munich. He published newspaper articles under pseudonyms and participated in the community, student and religious life.

Once travelling to Australia, for two years, Eugene Hlywa worked in the remote regions of Western Australia, to comply with one of the requirements of the Immigration Department contract.

== Life in Australia ==
In Australia, Eugene Hlywa actively participated in establishing the foundation of the organised Ukrainian community life in Australia. Thus, thanks to his and his friends' efforts, the Ukrainian Saturday school, music society and drama club, were established. He was a co-organiser and the Head of the Ukrainian Association of Sefton, Bass Hill and Chester Hill suburbs (two terms). He was the head of the building committee of the Monastery of St. Basil the Great in Sydney. He was also the founder and head of the inter-confessional committee of “Protection of Faith and Religion in Ukraine”. He was the organiser and head of the committee for preparations of the celebration of 1000-th anniversary of Christianisation of Ukraine.

In 1951, Eugene Hlywa married Lydia née Kreitzburg. Lydia, who was originally from Kyiv, was able to continue her career as a medical doctor in Australia. She died in 1993.

In 1952, the Hlywas moved to Sydney. Eugene worked as a lawyer and studied medicine. He chose to specialise in psychology. The reviewers of his doctoral dissertation, The Problem of a Personality in the Light of Modern Psychotherapy and the Unconscious, were professors Volodymyr Yaniv, Olexander von Kulchytsky and Stanislav Kratohvil. Since then, Hlywa dedicated himself to psychotherapy and hypnotherapy. In addition to his private practice and supervision of young professionals, Eugene Hlywa also taught. Thus, in 1975, he was invited to lecture Psychotherapy and Hypnotherapy at the two-year courses conducted by the Australian Society for Clinical and Experimental Hypnosis, now known as The Australian Society of Hypnosis.

Eugene Hlywa briefly worked at the Jung Institute (Switzerland), and frequently participated at a number national and international conferences and congresses in the USA including Harvard, Philadelphia, Southern Californian University, Germany, at Munich, Salzburg, in Lindau and also in Milan.

At the International Society of Hypnosis and Psychosomatic Medicine Congress in Philadelphia, Doctor Eugene Hlywa presented a resolution, in which he accused the USSR for misusing psychiatry for political purposes. He also discussed this topic in his Master's thesis “Psychotherapy in the Western World and USSR”.

Eugene Hlywa is a member of a number of scientific and public groups and organisations. He is the Head of the Delegature of Ukrainian Free University in Australia and foreign member of the Academy of Pedagogical Sciences of Ukraine, a correspondent member of Shevchenko Scientific Society, a full member of many psychological associations in Australia and other countries in the field of experimental, consultative, medical and clinical psychology, including:

- Institute of Clinical Psychologists in Private Practice
- The International Society of Hypnosis
- Fellow of the Australian Society of Hypnosis
- Australian Psychological Society, Division of Independently Practising Psychologists
- An Overseas Member of the Academy of the Pedagogical Sciences of Ukraine.

== Major works ==
- Psychotherapy in the Free World and the USSR. A comparative Study (MA thesis, 1973)
- The Problem of a Personality in the Light of Modern Psychotherapy and the Unconscious (Doctoral dissertation, 1974)
- Principles of Psychotherapy and Hypnotherapy (Sydney: Lev, 1998. – 344 pp.)
- Introduction to Psychotherapy (Ostroh-Kyiv: Ostroh Academy, 2004. – 530 pp.)
  The Ministry of Education and Science of Ukraine included Introduction to Psychotherapy (Ostroh-Kyiv: Ostroh Academy, 2004. – 530 pp.) in a list of officially recommended textbooks for psychiatry students.
- Ontological Theory of Personality in the writings of Hryhorii Skovoroda (Kyiv: Co Ltd “KMM”, 2006. – 256 pp.)
- Life Observations: through the Prism of my Own Heart (Ostroh: Publisher SPD Svynarchuk R.V., 2009. – 271 pp.)
- Discover Happiness within Yourself (Sydney: Lev, 2013. – 365 pp.)
