= Ed Greene (sound engineer) =

American sound engineer

- Born: Edward J. Greene; 1935; New York, U.S.
- Died: August 9, 2017 (aged 82); Los Angeles, California, U.S.
- Occupation: Sound engineer

Edward J. Greene (1935 – August 9, 2017) was an American sound engineer. He won twenty-one Primetime Emmy Awards and was nominated for forty more in the category Outstanding Sound Mixing.

Greene died on August 9, 2017, in Los Angeles, California, at the age of 82.
