= Thom Nairn =

Scottish poet, literary writer, and editor

Thom Nairn (8 July 1955 – 15 August 2017) was a Scottish poet and literary writer and editor. He was born in Perthshire, grew up in Coupar Angus and worked as a heraldic artist before studying at the University of Edinburgh.

After graduation he edited the literary magazine Cencrastus, wrote reviews and published several books of poetry, and in 1991 co-edited (with Robert Crawford) a book of essays on Alasdair Gray. The Times described his poetry as "surreal".

Later, he specialised in translating from Greek into English.

He died in Edinburgh from complications of pneumonia on 15 August 2017.
