= Garnett Kelly =

American politician

Member of the Missouri House of Representatives from the 146th district
- In office January 5, 1983 – January 9, 1985
- Preceded by: Dennis W. Smith
- Succeeded by: Mervin Case

Member of the Missouri House of Representatives from the 143rd district
- In office January 3, 1973 – January 5, 1983
- Preceded by: Marvin Kennon
- Succeeded by: Jim Mitchell

Member of the Missouri House of Representatives from the 148th district
- In office January 6, 1971 – January 3, 1973
- Preceded by: Mervin Case
- Succeeded by: Max Bacon

Personal details
- Born: July 23, 1924 Macomb, Missouri
- Died: August 5, 2017 (aged 93) Springfield, Missouri
- Party: Republican

Garnett Kelly (July 23, 1924 – August 5, 2017) was an American politician who served in the Missouri House of Representatives from 1971 to 1985.

He died on August 5, 2017, in Springfield, Missouri at age 93.
