= Bill Lasseter =

Canadian football player (1941–2017)

Profile
- Positions: Fullback, Defensive back

Personal information
- Born: May 6, 1941; Vancouver, British Columbia
- Died: August 16, 2017 (aged 76); Vancouver, British Columbia
- Listed height: 6 ft 0 in (1.83 m)
- Listed weight: 201 lb (91 kg)

Career history
- 1963–1969: BC Lions

Awards and highlights
- Grey Cup champion (1964)

William Lasseter (May 6, 1941 – August 16, 2017) was a Canadian professional football player who played for the BC Lions. He won the Grey Cup with them in 1964. He died of Parkinson's disease in 2017.
