= Art and Documentation =

- Discipline: Contemporary art
- Language: Polish, English
- Edited by: Łukasz Guzek

Publication details
- History: 2009–present
- Publisher: Academy of Fine Arts, Gdańsk (Poland)
- Frequency: Biannual
- Open access: Yes
- License: Creative Commons

Standard abbreviations
- ISO 4: Art Doc.

Indexing
- ISSN: 2080-413X

Links
- Journal homepage

Art and Documentation (Polish: Sztuka i Dokumentacja) is a biannual peer-reviewed academic journal on art. It was published in the years 2009–2017 by the Art and Documentation Association in Łódź. Since 2018 the journal is published by the Academy of Fine Arts, Gdańsk. All content is published under Creative Commons licenses. The journal is a platform aiming to shape views, pose questions, and initiate research. It focuses on works of an ephemeral nature, i.e. conceptual or post-conceptual works and related issues and documentation and documenting of contemporary art, as well as creating art based on documentation. It also publishes primary sources; gallery timelines, manifestos, artists' statements etc. The journal's aim is to include research on art within the broader field of performance studies, strengthen the relationship between academic research on art and contemporary art practices, and combine theory and practice in a more direct way. The editor-in-chief is Łukasz Guzek.

Articles are available at the journal's website alongside the databases of CEJSH, CEEOL, BazHum, EBSCO databases, ESCI, and the POL-index.
