= Tessa Holyoake =

Scottish oncology physician and leukemia researcher

Tessa Laurie Holyoake FRCP FRCPath FMedSci FRSE
- Tessa Holyoake
- Born: 17 March 1963; Aberdeen, Scotland
- Died: 30 August 2017 (aged 54); Loch Tummel, Perthshire, Scotland
- Education: University of Glasgow
- Occupations: medical doctor, clinical scientist
- Years active: –2017
- Known for: discovered stem cell of chronic myeloid leukaemia
- Medical career
- Institutions: University of Glasgow, Terry Fox Laboratory
- Sub-specialties: oncology
- Research: chronic myeloid leukaemia

Tessa Laurie Holyoake (17 March 1963 – 30 August 2017) was a Scottish haematology-oncology physician. She specialised in chronic myeloid leukaemia (CML), and discovered its stem cell. She was considered a world leading expert in leukaemia research.

== Early life and education ==
Tessa Holyoake was born in Aberdeen, Scotland on 17 March 1963. She attended Albyn School. She studied medicine at the University of Glasgow, and graduated in 1985. She completed her PhD at the Beatson Institute for Cancer Research in Glasgow.

== Career and research ==
After specialising in oncology, she worked from 1992 to 1996 as a clinical research fellow at the Cancer Research Campaign's laboratories in Glasgow. From 1996 to 1998, she worked at Terry Fox Laboratory in Vancouver and discovered that primitive stem cells in CML existed in a quiescent state, and therefore they did not respond to cell cycle-active agents like imatinib.

In 1999, she returned to Glasgow Royal Infirmary and in 2004, became Professor of Experimental Haematology, and Director of the Paul O'Gorman Leukaemia Research Centre. In 2005, she first presented work showing that a combination of imatinib or dasatinib with a farnesyl transferase inhibitor was better at eradicating CML stem cells, which was published in 2007.

She developed a drug treatment to target the abnormal CML stem cell, to go beyond the current lifelong tyrosine kinase inhibitor treatment.

== Awards and honours ==
- Scottish Health Awards Cancer Care Award, 2009
- Fellow of the Royal Society of Edinburgh, 2007 and recipient of the Royal Medal in 2017
- Lord Provost of Glasgow Health Award, 2011
- Fellow of the Academy of Medical Sciences, United Kingdom, 2013
- Scottish Alba Saltire Society Fletcher of Saltoun Award, 2015
- Scottish Cancer Foundation Inaugural Prize, 2015
- Evans/Forrest Medal, 2015
- Rowley Prize (International Chronic Myeloid Leukemia Foundation), 2017
- Fellow of the Royal College of Pathologists
- Fellow of the Royal College of Physicians

== Personal life ==
Tessa Holyoake was married to Andy, a general practitioner; they had no children. She enjoyed mountain biking, hill walking, and kayaking, and fundraised for the Leukaemia Research Centre by cycling and climbing Munros.

In addition to her research work, she continued a clinical practice as a consultant at the Beatson West of Scotland Cancer Centre in Glasgow.

On 31 August 2017, she died of metastatic breast cancer near Loch Tummel, Perthshire. The disease had been diagnosed in 2016.
