= Lateef Raji =

Nigerian politician

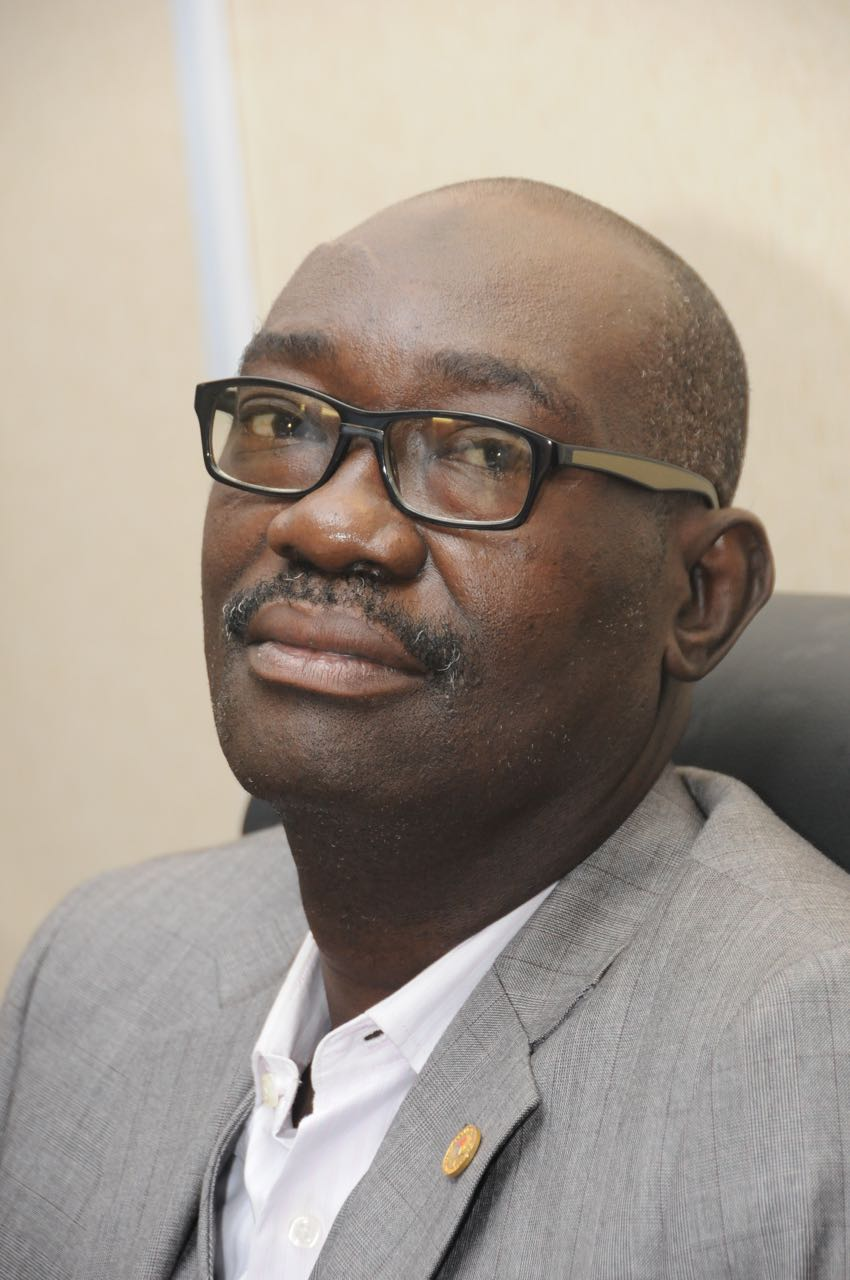
- Born: 12 October 1962; Idoani, Ondo State, Nigeria
- Died: 14 August 2017 (aged 54); Magodo, Lagos State, Nigeria
- Education: Irekari Grammar School; New Church High School; University of Lagos
- Occupations: businessman*
- Website: lateefraji.com

Lateef Oludare Raji (12 October 1962 – 14 August 2017) was a former adviser on information and strategy to former Lagos State Governor, Babatunde Raji Fashola. He was also a commissioner to former Lagos state Governor Bola Tinubu. He was a serving member of the Lagos State Independent Electoral Commission committee (LASIEC) before his death in 2017.

== Childhood and education ==
Raji was born in Ondo state. He started his educational journey at Irekari Grammar School, Idoani, between 1974 and 1978. He also attended New Church High School, Owo, Ondo State in 1978 and obtained his Ordinary Level School Certificate in 1980. Thereafter, he proceeded to University of Lagos to study history. He earned a Bachelor of Arts (Hons) in 1997 and also earned a master's degree in history in 2000.

== Career and politics ==
Raji started his career as an Editor with Ahrada West African Publishing between 1996 and year 2000 and was later promoted to Editor-in-Chief of the company in which capacity he worked between year 2000 and 2003. He also served as Nigeria's representative at the World Education Resources Centre, United Kingdom between 2003 and 2007. He later became the managing director / chief executive officer of Thrazel Nigerian. He later enrolled for a doctoral degree at the University of Lagos, Lagos.

Raji ventured into politics in 1999, he became the Alliance for Democracy lagos state secretary. He later became the chairman of a faction of the party when the party became factionalised. He is also credited for designing the All Progressives Congress logo as his hand is the one holding the broom in the symbol of the party right from when it was Action Congress of Nigeria until it metamorphosed into APC now.

He contested for the House of Representatives Osodi/Isolo federal Constituency in 2011 under the platform of APC but didn't get the party ticket. He was later appointed as Special Adviser on Information and Strategy to former Lagos State Governor, Babatunde Raji Fashola between 2011 and 2015.

In 2015 general election he also vied to represent his constituency for House of Representatives Osodi/Isolo but lost the party ticket to Hon. Timothy Olumuyiwa Olubintan and later became a governorship aspirant for APC in Ondo state in 2016.

On 29 June 2016, he was appointed as a member Lagos State Independent Electoral Commission committee (LASIEC) by governor Akinwunmi Ambode.

== Personal life ==
Raji was a Muslim, married to Alhaja Raji and had four children.

== Death ==
Raji died in the early hours of 14 August 2017 of pharynx cancer. He was later buried the same day at his hometown in Idoani, Ondo state, according to Islamic rites.
