= Graham Wiltshire =

English cricketer

Personal information
- Full name: Graham George Murley Wiltshire
- Born: 16 April 1931; Chipping Sodbury, Gloucestershire, England
- Died: 2 August 2017 (aged 86)
- Batting: Right-handed
- Role: Bowler

Domestic team information
- Years: Team
- 1953–1960: Gloucestershire

Career statistics
Competition	FC
Matches	19
Runs scored	218
Batting average
100s/50s
Top score
Balls bowled
Wickets	25
Bowling average
5 wickets in innings
10 wickets in match
Best bowling
Catches/stumpings
- Source: Cricinfo, 1 August 2013

Graham Wiltshire (16 April 1931 – 2 August 2017) was an English cricketer. He played for Gloucestershire between 1953 and 1960.

A seam bowler, he played 19 times for Gloucestershire with a best bowling performance of 5/53 against Yorkshire. After he retired from playing he coached Gloucestershire for two decades in the 1970s and 1980s.
