= Sirkka Selja =

Finnish poet and writer

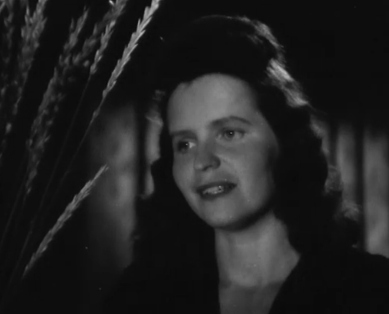
- Born: Sirkka-Liisa Tulonen; 20 March 1920 Hämeenkoski, Finland
- Died: 17 August 2017 (aged 97) Hollola, Finland
- Occupation: Poet
- Years active: 1942–2012
- Notable awards: Pro Finlandia (1970)

Sirkka Selja (20 March 1920 – 17 August 2017) was a Finnish poet and writer. She was born in Hämeenkoski, Finland. Her real name was Sirkka-Liisa Tulonen.

== Career ==
Her first book was published in 1942 titled Still I Live. In addition to poems, her production includes a play and two listening works. Selja was awarded with the State Literature Prize of Finland in 1958, the Pro Finlandia in 1970, the Aleksis Kivi Prize in 1987 and the P. Mustapää Prize in 2007. She died on 17 August 2017 in Hollola, Finland at the age of 97.

== Works ==
- Vielä minä elän (1942)
- Vedenneito (1944)
- Taman lauluja (1945)
- Linnut (1948)
- Niin kuin ovi (1953)
- Enkelin pelto (1957)
- Juuret (1962)
- Vierailulla ketun talossa (1966)
- Runot (1970)
- Kissansilmät (1971)
- Talo nimeltä Villiruusu (1975)
- Pisaroita iholla (1978)
- Unitie (1985)
- Aurinko on tallella: valitut runot 1942–1985 (1988)
- Valokuvaaja: proosarunoja (1995)
- Puut herättävät muistini (2000)
- Mahdottomuuden ylistys (2005)
- Riikinkukon lapsi (2010)
