= Ted Corbett (journalist) =

English cricket writer and sports journalist

Edwin Fawdry Corbett (21 February 1935 – 9 August 2017) was an English cricket writer and sports journalist. Best known for his cricket journalism, Corbett also covered both rugby codes, soccer, snooker, golf and athletics. He reported extensively on behalf of The Hindu, the Financial Times and other publications.

== Biography ==
Corbett was born in Birmingham and began his career in 1951, as a tea boy, aged 16, at the Yorkshire Evening Press. During his National Service he edited Japan News, the forces newspaper, in Tokyo. Following his military service, Corbett returned to York as a sports writer, went on to the Daily Herald, the Daily Mirror, the Daily Telegraph and the Daily Express, before becoming cricket correspondent of the Daily Star in 1982. In 1989, Corbett set up his own sports agency, Cricket Direct. Corbett also wrote for the Indian daily newspaper The Hindu and its supplementary sports digest, The Sportstar. He also wrote the novel The Great Cricket Betting Scandal (Parrs Wood Press, 2000), about a fictional English cricket tour of India in the early 1900s.

Corbett continued his sports journalism into his eighties. He died in Huntingdon in August 2017, aged 82.
