= Jerzy Leśniak =

Polish journalist, author and historian

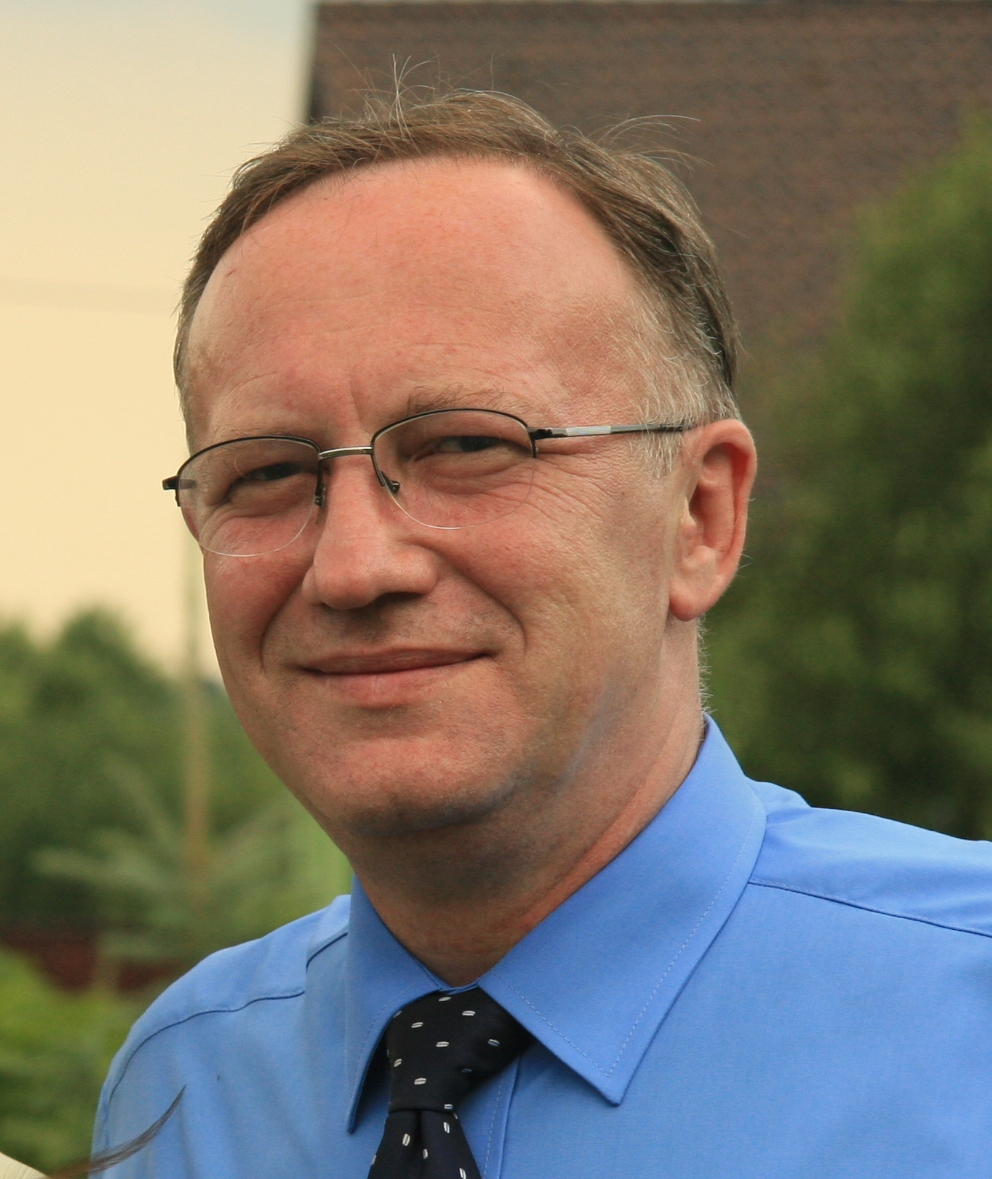
Jerzy Leśniak

Jerzy Leśniak (14 August 1957, Nowy Sącz, Poland – 20 August 2017) was a Polish journalist, author and historian.

His best-known book, Encyklopedia Sądecka (published in 2000, co-authored with Augustyn Leśniak and Karol Leśniak), has been so far the most comprehensive source and compendium of the region's history, as well as personal biographies and rare illustrations.

A graduate of the department of political science and journalism at the Jagiellonian University in Kraków. In the early 1980s he began working for a regional newspaper "Dunajec", then moved to a daily Gazeta Krakowska (head of the Nowy Sącz office since 1989-95) and Dziennik Polski (1996–2003).

Leśniak was an editor-in-chief of a weekly regional magazine Echo and a quarterly Nowy Sącz. During the years 2003-06 he was a spokesman of the president of the city of Nowy Sącz. Up to this day he has been one of the editors of the annual print of "Rocznik Sądecki" and an academic teacher of mass communication. He is a secretary general of the regional association Klub Ziemi Sądeckiej.

== Selected bibliography ==
- Encyklopedia Sądecka (co-authored with Augustyn Leśniak and Karol Leśniak), 2000
- Nowy Sącz – miasto niezwykłe (co-authored with Piotr Droździk and Augustyn Leśniak), 2004
- Srebrne gody Sądeczoków, 2005
- Piórko i peleryna (co-authored with Sławomir Sikora), 2006
- Nowy Sącz - z wieży ratuszowej (co-authored with Sławomir Sikora), 2006
- Od Warsztatów do Newagu. Od Louisa do Halnego (co-authored with Sławomir Sikora and Jerzy Wideł), 2006
- Gród św. Kingi (album with the pictures of Adam Bujak), 2007
- Panorama Kultury Sądeckiej (co-authored with Sławomir Sikora), 2008
- Bóg, honor, ojczyzna. Sądeccy żołnierze i generałowie w służbie niepodległej Rzeczpospolitej (co-authored with Henryk Szewczyk), 2008
- Perły Doliny Popradu (album with the pictures of Jerzy Żak), 2009
- Druga młodość Starego Sącza 1990-2010 (co-authored with Sławomir Sikora), 2010
- Nowy Sącz – Narwik. Opowieść o dwóch miastach – historia i współczesność. W 70. rocznicę kampanii norweskiej (współautorzy: Leszek Migrała, Sławomir Sikora), 2010
- Okno życia – S.O.S ks. kardynała Karola Wojtyły (współautor: Sławomir Sikora), 2010
- Bank Spółdzielczy w Nowym Sączu 1912–2012, 2012
- Tygodnik „Dunajec” 1980–1990 [w:] Prasa sądecka od zarania do dziś 1891–2011, 2012
- 100 lat sądeckich wodociągów (współautor: Leszek Migrała), 2012
- Sądeckie ścieżki – od Ziemi Świętej do Kalifornii. Reportaże z 25 krajów, 2012
- 101 sądeczan, 2012
