= Jean-Marie Berthier =

French poet (1940–2017)

- Born: 25 June 1940; Marseille, France
- Died: 8 August 2017 (aged 77)
- Occupation: Poet
- Spouse: Danielle Berthier

Jean-Marie Berthier (25 June 1940 – 8 August 2017) was a French poet. He taught literature in Africa, Asia and South America, and was the author of over 20 poetry collections.

Berthier won the 2010 Prix François Coppée from the Académie française for Attente très belle de mon attente.

== See also ==
- French poetry
