= Robert F. Garrison =

Robert Frederick Garrison (May 9, 1936 – August 13, 2017) was an American astrophysicist and professor at the University of Toronto, and was well known for his work in the MK System, that was developed by Morgan and Keenan in 1943. He earned the Lifetime Teaching Achievement Award by the University of Toronto in 2001. Garrison attended Yerkes Observatory, University of Chicago in 1960, and earned a doctorate degree in astronomy and astrophysics six years later. It was during that era when Garrison was inspired by his director William, Morgan and started to have a strong passion in astronomy.

== Early life and education ==
Robert F. Garrison was born on May 9, 1936, in Aurora, Illinois, to Robert W. and Dorothy I. (Rydquist) Garrison. During his years in West Aurora High school, he met his first wife, Ada V. Mighell around the 1950s. After Garrison served for the US Marine Corps for about 2 years (1954–1956), he attended Earlham College to earn his B.A degree in math. During this time, Garrison started a new path in astronomy because he was inspired by Professor Clifford Crump. This led him to attend the University of Wisconsin in 1960 to study Physics and obtained his Ph.D. in astronomy at the University of Chicago just six years later (1966). Around the late 1960s, after Garrison was inspired by Morgan's work in the MK classifications of stars, he held a postdoctoral fellowship at the Mount Wilson and Palomar Observatories and serves as associate director of the David Dunlap Observatory in Toronto, Canada. He was President of the Commission 45 Stellar Classification from 1985 to 1988.

Garrison was then appointed as professor emeritus in 2001. For about two decades, Garrison was collaborating his research and field of work with Christopher Corbally and Richard Gray.
