= Stepove =

Stepove (Ukrainian: Степове) is a Ukrainian toponym and the name of several settlements in Ukraine. It is an adjective form of the word step, which means steppe. It is etymologically related to the Russian-language toponym Stepnoye.

== Crimea ==
- Stepove, Saky Raion, a village in Crimea also known in the Crimean Tatar language as Qambar
- Stepove, Feodosia Municipality, a village near Feodosia in Crimea

== Dnipropetrovsk Oblast ==
- Stepove, Velykomykhailivka rural hromada, Synelnykove Raion, Dnipropetrovsk Oblast, an abandoned village

== Donetsk Oblast ==
- Stepove, Donetsk Oblast, a village near Avdiivka

== Mykolaiv Oblast ==
- Stepove, Stepove rural hromada, Mykolaiv Raion, Mykolaiv Oblast, formerly the German colony of Karlsruhe

== Ternopil Oblast ==
- Stepove, Ternopil Oblast, a village which until 1977 was known as Ryhailykha

== Zaporizhzhia Oblast ==
- Stepove, Stepnohirsk settlement hromada, Vasylivka Raion, Zaporizhzhia Oblast, a village
- Stepove, Rozdolivka rural hromada, Vasylivka Raion, Zaporizhzhia Oblast, a village
- Stepove, Polohy Raion, Zaporizhzhia Oblast, a village
- Stepove, Berdiansk Raion, Zaporizhzhia Oblast, a village
- Stepove, Melitopol Raion, Zaporizhzhia Oblast, a village
