= Hryhorii Petryshyn =

Ukrainian priest, archpriest, writer

- Григорій Петришин
- Born: 12 June 1934; Holhocha, Second Polish Republic
- Died: 25 October 1998 (aged 64); Shveikiv, Ternopil Oblast, Ukraine
- Education: Odesa Theological Academy, Moscow Theological Academy

Hryhorii Prokopovych Petryshyn (Ukrainian: Григорій Прокопович Петришин; 12 June 1934, Holhocha, Second Polish Republic – 25 October 1998, Shveikiv, Ternopil Oblast, Ukraine) was a Ukrainian priest, protoiereus, and writer.

== Biography ==
Hryhorii Petryshyn was born on 12 June 1934, in Holhocha, now Pidhaitsi Hromada, Ternopil Raion, Ternopil Oblast, Ukraine.

He graduated from the Theological Seminary in Odesa (1963) and the Theological Academy in Moscow (1968, now the Russian Federation). He served as a pastor in the villages of Potutory, Ternopil (1963–1974), Hadynkivtsi, Chortkiv (1974–1983), Zastavtsi, Chortkiv (1983–1993), Verbiv, Ternopil (1993–1996) and Shveikiv, Chortkiv (1996–1998) Raions of the Ternopil Oblast. He usually accompanied his sermons with his own poems.

Petryshyn was oppressed by the Soviet authorities.

Since 1993, he has been a chaplain of the OUN-UPA Brotherhood of the Podillia region "Lysonia".

Petryshyn died on 25 October 1998 in Shveikiv, Ternopil Oblast.

== Creativity ==
Author of the collection of spiritual poems "Strumok z vichnosti" (2000, compiled by H. Petruk-Popyk), as well as publications in the press.

== Honoring the memory ==
In 2004, a memorial plaque was installed on the family home in Holhocha.

== Sources ==
- Бережанська земля : історико-мемуарний збірник. Т. 2, редкол.: Л. Бабій, В. Бернадський, Д. Мельник, Торонто; Нью-Йорк; Париж; Сидней; Бережани; Козова, 1998, s. 544.
- Бережанська земля : книга пам'яті. Т. 3, ред.-уряд. Василь Савчук, Т. : Збруч, 2006, s. 564.
- Петрук–Попик Г. Слово Боже, святе, українне… // Свобода. — 1998 — 5 груд.
- Джиджора, М. Велика любов Капелана, Свобода, 06.07.1999.
- Дичко, Б. Голгофа отця Петришина, Свобода, 07.08.2001, (Пам'ять).
- Горловиця, О. Був він парохом від Бога, Свобода, 06.11.2001.
- Дем'янець, В. Щастя любові — до Бога та України, Вільне життя, 29.04.2011, s. 6, (Наші славні земляки).
