= Rudnyky, Ternopil Oblast =

Rural locality in Ternopil Oblast, Ukraine

Rudnyky Рудники
- Location in Ternopil Oblast
- Coordinates: 49°15′56″N 25°2′37″E
- Country: Ukraine
- Oblast: Ternopil Oblast
- Raion: Ternopil Raion
- Hromada: Pidhaitsi urban hromada
- Time zone: UTC+2 (EET)
  - Summer (DST): UTC+3 (EEST)
- Postal code: 48030

Rudnyky (Ukrainian: Рудники) is a village in Pidhaitsi urban hromada, Ternopil Raion, Ternopil Oblast, Ukraine.

== History ==
The first written mention of the village was in 1473.

After the liquidation of the Pidhaitsi Raion on 19 July 2020, the village became part of the Ternopil Raion.

== Religion ==
- Church of the Intercession (UGCC, 1881, wooden).

== Sources ==
- (in Ukrainian) Мельничук Б., Уніят В., Рудники // Ternopil Encyclopedic Dictionary: in 4 v. / editorial board: H. Yavorskyi and other, Ternopil: "Zbruch", 2008, V. 3: П—Я, S. 205–206. — ISBN 978-966-528-279-2.
- "Rudniki (3)". Geographical Dictionary of the Kingdom of Poland (in Polish). 9. Warszawa: Kasa im. Józefa Mianowskiego. 1888. p. 939.
