= Soniachne, Ternopil Oblast =

Rural locality in Ternopil Oblast, Ukraine

Soniachne Сонячне
- Location in Ternopil Oblast
- Coordinates: 49°19′43″N 25°17′47″E
- Country: Ukraine
- Oblast: Ternopil Oblast
- Raion: Ternopil Raion
- Hromada: Pidhaitsi urban hromada
- Time zone: UTC+2 (EET)
  - Summer (DST): UTC+3 (EEST)
- Postal code: 48013

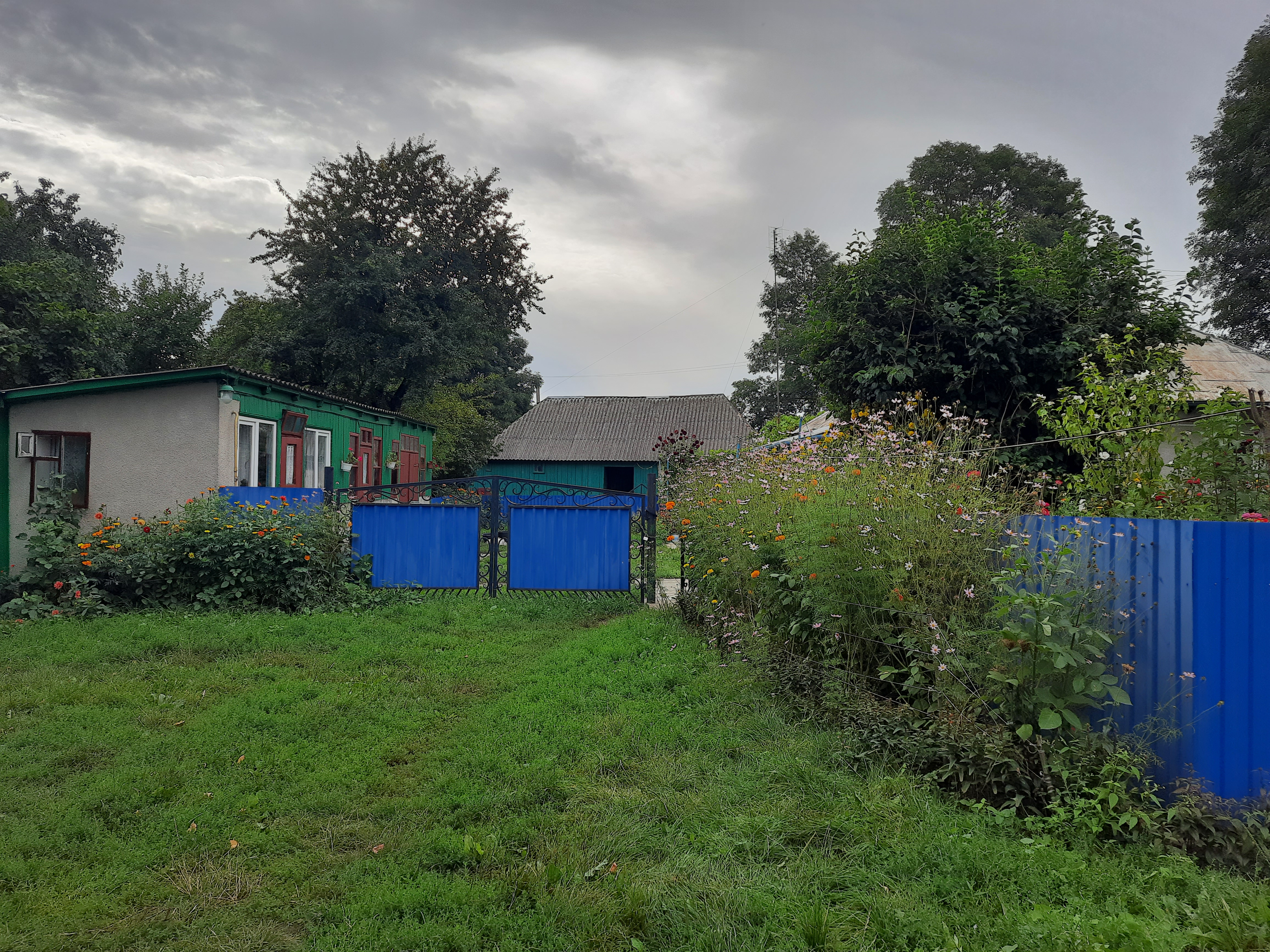

Soniachne (Ukrainian: Сонячне; until 1977, Skinderivka) is a village in Pidhaitsi urban hromada, Ternopil Raion, Ternopil Oblast, Ukraine.

== History ==
The first written mention of the village was in 16th century.

After the liquidation of the Pidhaitsi Raion on 19 July 2020, the village became part of the Ternopil Raion.

== Sources ==
- (in Ukrainian) Ханас Вас., Сонячне // Ternopil Encyclopedic Dictionary: in 4 v. / editorial board: H. Yavorskyi and other, Ternopil: "Zbruch", 2008, V. 3: П—Я, S. 313. — ISBN 978-966-528-279-2.
