= Myrne, Ternopil Oblast =

Rural locality in Ternopil Oblast, Ukraine

Myrne Мирне
- Location in Ternopil Oblast
- Coordinates: 49°21′12″N 25°6′36″E
- Country: Ukraine
- Oblast: Ternopil Oblast
- Raion: Ternopil Raion
- Hromada: Pidhaitsi urban hromada
- Time zone: UTC+2 (EET)
  - Summer (DST): UTC+3 (EEST)
- Postal code: 47530

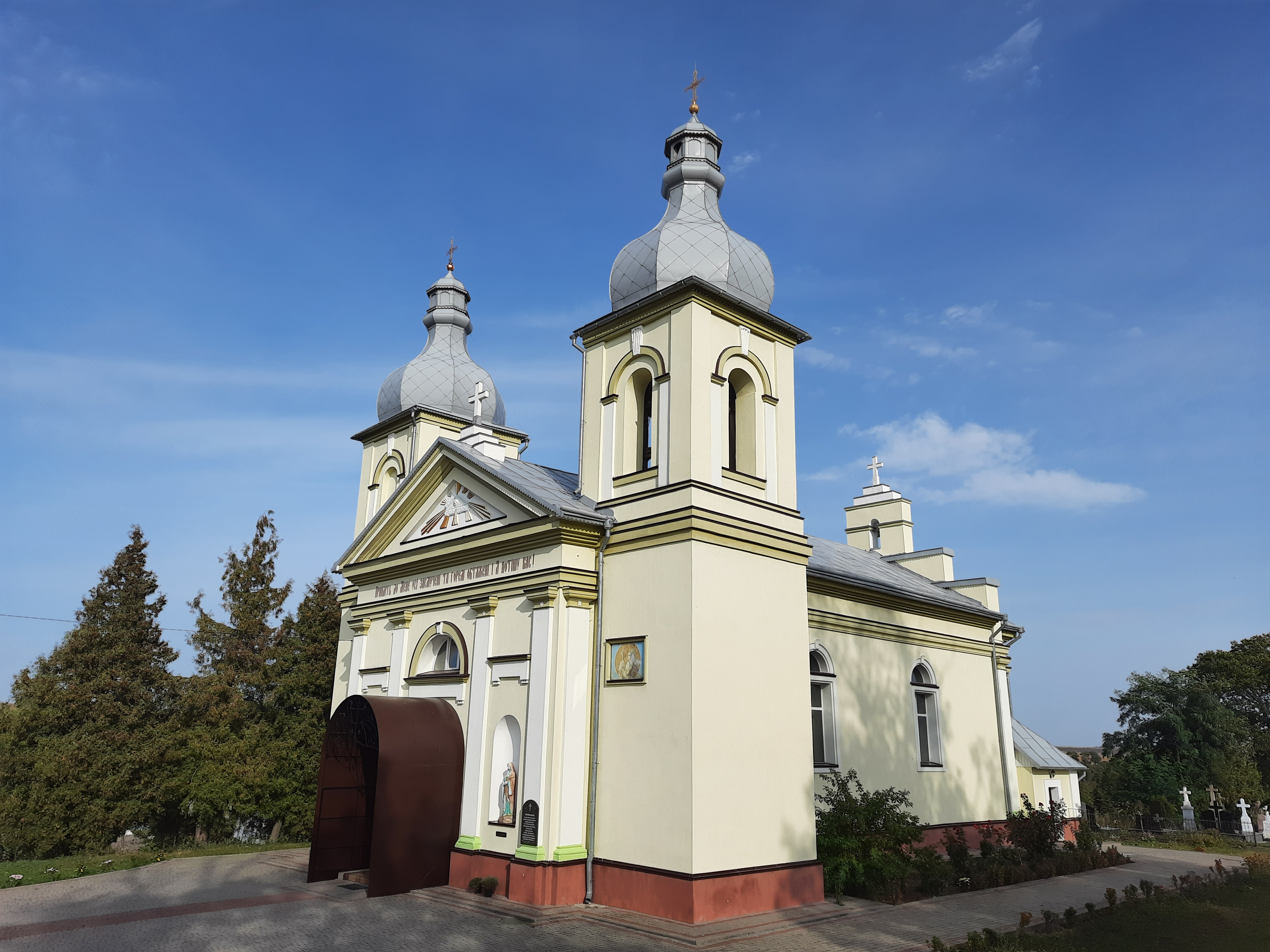
Church of St. Paraskeva of Ternovskaya Myrne, Ternopil district, Ternopil region

Myrne (Ukrainian: Мирне) is a village in Pidhaitsi urban hromada, Ternopil Raion, Ternopil Oblast, Ukraine.

== History ==
The first written mention of the village was in 1440.

After the liquidation of the Pidhaitsi Raion on 19 July 2020, the village became part of the Ternopil Raion.

== Religion ==
- Saint Paraskeva church (1820s, brick).

== Notable residents ==
The writer Bohdan Lepkyi visited the village.

== Sources ==
- (in Ukrainian) Зьомко Г., Уніят В., Мирне // Ternopil Encyclopedic Dictionary: in 4 v. / editorial board: H. Yavorskyi and other, Ternopil: "Zbruch", 2005, V. 2: К—О, S. 515-516. — ISBN 966-528-199-2.
- "Telacze 2.) wś, powiat podhajecki (Galicja)". Geographical Dictionary of the Kingdom of Poland (in Polish). 12. Warszawa: Kasa im. Józefa Mianowskiego. 1892. p. 281.
