= Wincenty Okołowicz =

Polish geographer (1906–1979)

- Born: 26 June 1906; Boków, Austrian-administered Poland (now Bokiv, Ukraine)
- Died: 3 September 1979 (aged 73); Warsaw, Polish People's Republic
- Occupation: Geographer
- Known for: Classification of the world's climates

Academic work
- Discipline: Geography
- Sub-discipline: Climatology
- Institutions: Nicolaus Copernicus University; University of Warsaw

Wincenty Okołowicz (Polish pronunciation: [vinˈt͡sɛntɨ ɔkɔˈwɔvit͡ʂ]; 26 June 1906 – 3 September 1979) was a Polish geographer and an expert in geomorphology and climatology. He is best known as the author of the 1965 major Polish classification of world's climates, Climatic Zones of the World (Polish: Strefy klimatyczne świata).

== Early life ==
Okołowicz was born in a small village of Boków, near modern-day Pidhaitsi, Ukraine.

== Career ==
In 1945, he joined the newly established Department of Geography, at the Nicolaus Copernicus University in Toruń. He became a professor at Warsaw University in 1952. From 1953 to 1959, he was the director of the State Hydrological and Meteorological Institute (Polish: Państwowy Instytut Hydrologiczno-Meteorologiczny).

From 1956 to 1959, he was a vice-chairman of the Polish Academy of Sciences's Commission for the International Geophysical Year (Polish: Międzynarodowego Roku Geofizycznego). He is the author of a map of climatic spheres (1965) as well as the first Polish textbook for climatology (Klimatologia ogólna, 1969).

Okołowicz died on 3 September 1979 in Warsaw.

== Bibliography ==
- Kejna, Marek (2018). Geografia w Uniwersytecie Mikołaja Kopernika w Toruniu 1945–2018 [Geography at Nicolaus Copernicus University in Toruń 1945–2018] (PDF) (Speech) (in Polish). Toruń: Nicolaus Copernicus University.
- Stopa-Boryczka, Maria; Boryczka, Jerzy (2008). Lisowski, Andrzej [in Polish] (ed.). "Wincenty Okołowicz" (PDF). Prace i Studia Geograficzne (in Polish) (40). University of Warsaw: 255–268. ISSN 2543-7313.
