= Cherven (village) =

Rural locality in Ternopil Oblast, Ukraine

Cherven Червень
- Location in Ternopil Oblast
- Coordinates: 49°12′36″N 24°57′40″E
- Country: Ukraine
- Oblast: Ternopil Oblast
- Raion: Ternopil Raion
- Hromada: Pidhaitsi urban hromada
- Time zone: UTC+2 (EET)
  - Summer (DST): UTC+3 (EEST)
- Postal code: 48034

Cherven (Ukrainian: Червень) is a village in Pidhaitsi urban hromada, Ternopil Raion, Ternopil Oblast, Ukraine.

== History ==
The village has been known from the 14th century.

After the liquidation of the Pidhaitsi Raion on 19 July 2020, the village became part of the Ternopil Raion.

== Religion ==
- Chapel of the Intercession (UGCC, 2001).

== Sources ==
- (in Ukrainian) Ковальков Ю., Червень // Ternopil Encyclopedic Dictionary: in 4 v. / editorial board: H. Yavorskyi and other, Ternopil: "Zbruch", 2008, V. 3: П—Я, S. 587. — ISBN 978-966-528-279-2.
