= Zavaliv Monastery =

The St. Nicholas Monastery (Ukrainian: Завалівський монастир Святого Миколая) is a lost Basilian monastery of the Ukrainian Greek Catholic Church. It was located in on Kamiana Hora village of Zavaliv, in the Pidhaitsi Hromada, Ternopil Raion, Ternopil Oblast.

== History ==
The existence of the monastery is dated to the beginning of the 17th century, although the exact date of its founding remains unknown. The first accounts regarding the establishment of the monastic community are shrouded in military legends, which were first recorded by Joannicius Galiatovsky, and later, in 1755, by the lord of Zavaliv, Józef Aleksander Jabłonowski. The legendary tradition links the monastery's foundation to military events from the time of the Tatar raids.

According to the accounts, the Ruthenian Voivode Roman (or Prince Roman Ostrogski, the brother of King Daniel of Galicia, according to Jabłonowski's version) was surrounded by the troops of Khan Buniak. Saint Nicholas appeared to him in a dream, commanding him to go into battle and build a church in honor of the Most Holy Theotokos (Mother of God) at the place of the future victory, and a church in honor of Saint Nicholas himself between the three ramparts where he was resting. Having won the victory over the Tatars, Roman followed these instructions, founding the St. Nicholas Monastery in Zavaliv. The community was destroyed during the Turkish-Tatar raids in the mid-17th century, specifically in 1675 by the troops of Kara Mustafa.

== Revival and Economy ==
The revival of the monastery began at the end of the 17th century, and from 1700, the Hegumen Sylwester Tarasewicz became its chief builder, reconstructing the wooden three-domed church and new cells. He received privileges for land and a mill from the landowner Aleksander Jan Jabłonowski in 1714 and 1721, which ensured the community's economic independence.

In 1743, the monastery became part of the Ruthenian Province of the Protection of the Most Holy Theotokos of the Basilian Order, and later, in 1780, it joined the Galician Province of the Most Holy Savior. According to the 1773 inventory, the monastery complex consisted of many wooden buildings surrounded by a fence with a shingled roof. The center was the wooden three-domed Church of St. Nicholas. To the south of it was a bell tower with a chapel, and to the west stretched the monastic cells. Separate from the monastic buildings was the economic courtyard, which included a cowshed, a threshing barn, and barns covered with thatched roofs.

The monastery maintained a developed economy, sowing winter and spring wheat, as well as rye, oats, and other crops, and also keeping cattle and poultry. It possessed an orchard, and from 1778, it operated a leather tanning factory.

The monastery's subjects who lived on the jurydyka (monastic jurisdiction) fulfilled duties. In particular, the farmhands (parobkowie, peasants with draft animals) worked two days of corvée per week during the warm season.

In 1773, 66 liturgical books were stored in the church, and the monastic library held 91 books in Ruthenian, Polish, and Latin, including the 1729 inventory transferred from the liquidated monastery in Lytvyniv.

== Liquidation ==
In 1787, the monastery was included in the list of religious communities of the Austrian Empire designated for liquidation, and the final decision was made in 1793. The property was sold off by auction (licytacja): two bells were acquired by the monastery in Buchach, the iconostasis and the altar of St. Nicholas were transferred to the parish church in Zavaliv, and the library was donated to University of Lviv. The lands and forests were acquired by Teofila Strzeżysława Sapieha.

In 1882, Ivan Franko paid special attention to the iconostasis in the Zavaliv church, particularly to two small paintings depicting severed heads on the deacon's gates, emphasizing their high realism, harmony of colors, and the influence of Italian idealistic schools of the 15th–16th centuries. The main row of the iconostasis, executed under the influence of Western tradition, with rich wood carving, has been preserved.

At the site of the former monastery, the area of which was already covered by forest in 1915, a "miracle" of the apparition of the Mother of God occurred in 1928, which initiated mass pilgrimages. In modern times, a newly built chapel was consecrated here in 2004, and a Way of the Cross was established in 2006, which renewed the sacred significance of this place.

== Hegumens ==
- Wysznowecki (1687)
- Sylwester Tarasewycz (1700–1724)
- Teodor Doliński (1754)
- Pachomij Nehrebecki (1762–1763)
- Porfyrij Barankewycz (1764–1765)
- Josafat Siedlecki (1766)
- Matkowski (May 1769)
- Leon Zasławski (1773)
- Teofan Duszyński (April 1775–1777)
- Sylwester Hrehorowycz (1778)
- Antonij Smereczynski (1780)
- Tadej Łaszkewycz (November 1782 – June 1783)
- Awksentij Dubnećkyj (June 1783 – July 1786)
- Heraklij Bilkewycz (July 1786 – April 1788)
- Sebastijan Fryzinski (April 1788 – November 1789)
- Ipolit Lenkewycz (November 1789 – May 1793)
