= Uhryniv, Ternopil Oblast =

Rural locality in Ternopil Oblast, Ukraine

Uhryniv Угринів
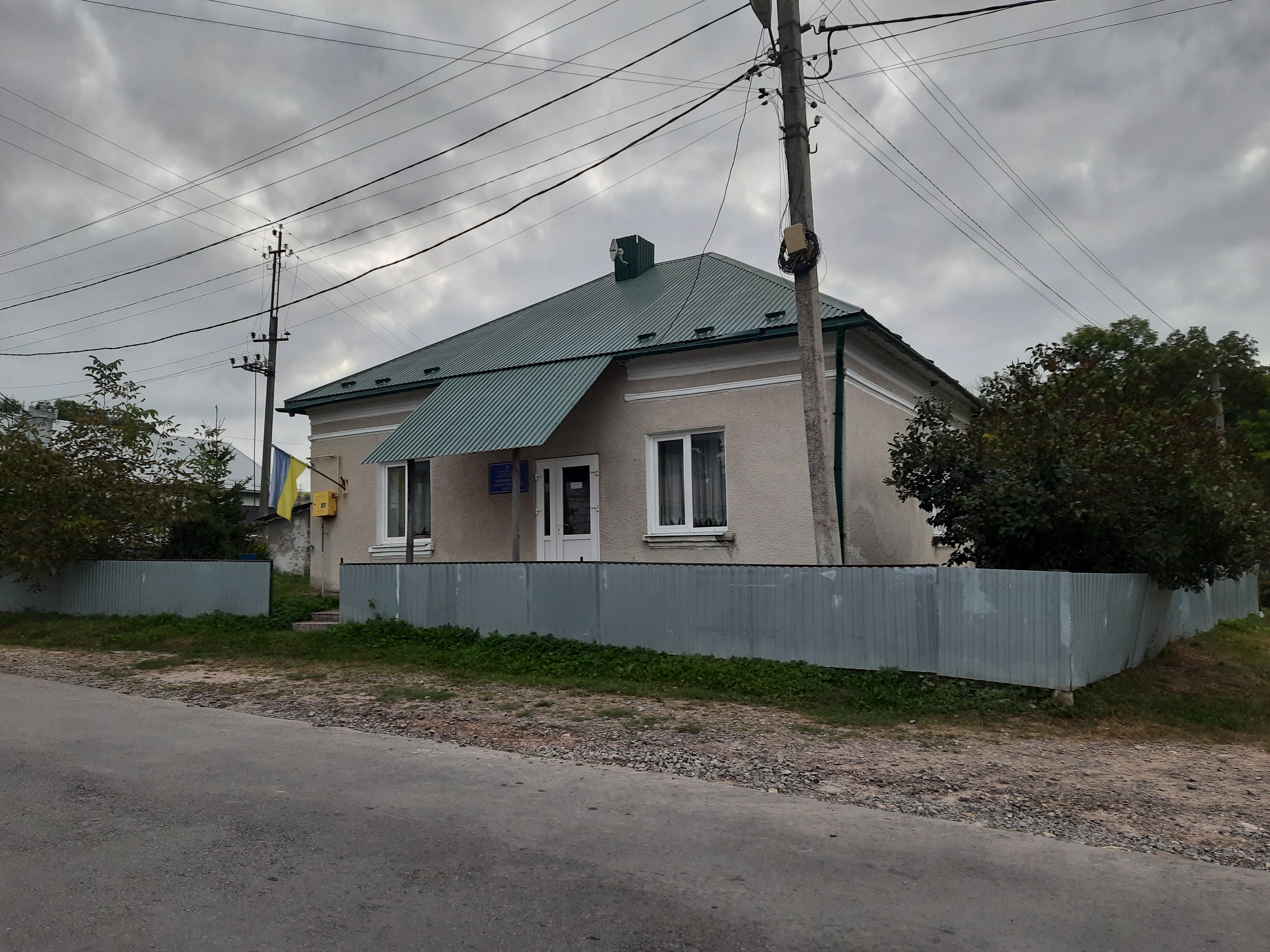
- Starostat Uhryniv, Ternopil district, Ternopil region

- Location in Ternopil Oblast
- Coordinates: 49°15′15″N 25°4′37″E
- Country: Ukraine
- Oblast: Ternopil Oblast
- Raion: Ternopil Raion
- Hromada: Pidhaitsi urban hromada
- Time zone: UTC+2 (EET)
  - Summer (DST): UTC+3 (EEST)
- Postal code: 48020

Uhryniv (Ukrainian: Угринів) is a village in Pidhaitsi urban hromada, Ternopil Raion, Ternopil Oblast, Ukraine.

== History ==
The first written mention of the village was in 1515.

After the liquidation of the Pidhaitsi Raion on 19 July 2020, the village became part of the Ternopil Raion.

== Religion ==
- Church of the Intercession (UGCC, 1936, wooden).

== Sources ==
- (in Ukrainian) Ксидра Б., Уніят В., Угринів // Ternopil Encyclopedic Dictionary: in 4 v. / editorial board: H. Yavorskyi and other, Ternopil: "Zbruch", 2008, V. 3: П—Я, S. 482. — ISBN 978-966-528-279-2.
- "Uhrynów". Geographical Dictionary of the Kingdom of Poland (in Polish). 12. Warszawa: Kasa im. Józefa Mianowskiego. 1892. p. 758.
