= Mykhailivka, Ternopil Raion, Ternopil Oblast =

Rural locality in Ternopil Oblast, Ukraine

Mykhailivka Михайлівка
- Location in Ternopil Oblast
- Coordinates: 49°16′6″N 25°16′32″E
- Country: Ukraine
- Oblast: Ternopil Oblast
- Raion: Ternopil Raion
- Hromada: Pidhaitsi urban hromada
- Time zone: UTC+2 (EET)
  - Summer (DST): UTC+3 (EEST)
- Postal code: 48005

Mykhailivka (Ukrainian: Михайлівка) is a village in Pidhaitsi urban hromada, Ternopil Raion, Ternopil Oblast, Ukraine.

== History ==
The first written mention of the village was in 1701.

After the liquidation of the Pidhaitsi Raion on 19 July 2020, the village became part of the Ternopil Raion.

== Religion ==
- Church of the Cathedral of the Blessed Virgin Mary (1882, brick).

== Sources ==
- (in Ukrainian) Пона І., Ханас М., Михайлівка // Ternopil Encyclopedic Dictionary: in 4 v. / editorial board: H. Yavorskyi and other, Ternopil: "Zbruch", 2005, V. 2: К—О, S. 520. — ISBN 966-528-199-2.
