= Serednie, Ternopil Oblast =

Rural locality in Ternopil Oblast, Ukraine

Serednie Середнє
- Location in Ternopil Oblast
- Coordinates: 49°11′27″N 25°2′45″E
- Country: Ukraine
- Oblast: Ternopil Oblast
- Raion: Ternopil Raion
- Hromada: Pidhaitsi urban hromada
- Time zone: UTC+2 (EET)
  - Summer (DST): UTC+3 (EEST)
- Postal code: 47516

Serednie (Ukrainian: Середнє) is a village in Pidhaitsi urban hromada, Ternopil Raion, Ternopil Oblast, Ukraine.

== History ==
The first written mention of the village was in 1515.

After the liquidation of the Pidhaitsi Raion on 19 July 2020, the village became part of the Ternopil Raion.

== Religion ==
- Saint Nicholas church (1996, brick).

== Sources ==
- (in Ukrainian) Кіцик Е., Уніят В., Середнє // Ternopil Encyclopedic Dictionary: in 4 v. / editorial board: H. Yavorskyi and other, Ternopil: "Zbruch", 2008, V. 3: П—Я, S. 250. — ISBN 978-966-528-279-2.
- "Seredne (2), pow. podhajecki". Geographical Dictionary of the Kingdom of Poland (in Polish). 10. Warszawa: Kasa im. Józefa Mianowskiego. 1889. p. 439.
