= Mozolivka, Ternopil Oblast =

Rural locality in Ternopil Oblast, Ukraine

Mozolivka Мозолівка
- Location in Ternopil Oblast
- Coordinates: 49°12′28″N 25°14′22″E
- Country: Ukraine
- Oblast: Ternopil Oblast
- Raion: Ternopil Raion
- Hromada: Pidhaitsi urban hromada
- Time zone: UTC+2 (EET)
  - Summer (DST): UTC+3 (EEST)
- Postal code: 48024

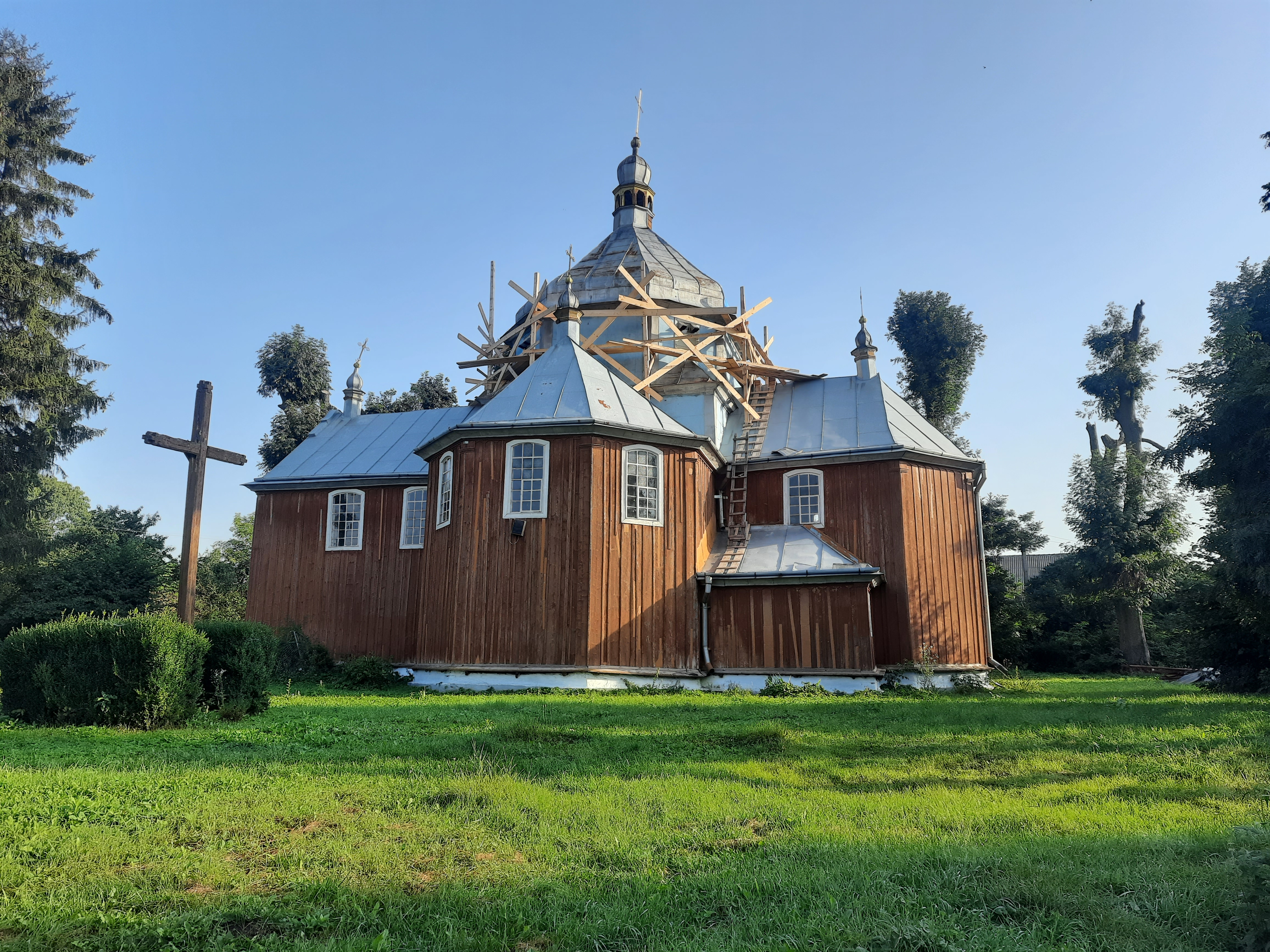
Church of the Intercession of the Blessed Virgin Mary Mozolivka Ternopil district, Ternopil region

Mozolivka (Ukrainian: Мозолівка) is a village in Pidhaitsi urban hromada, Ternopil Raion, Ternopil Oblast, Ukraine.

== History ==
The first written mention of the village was in 1702.

After the liquidation of the Pidhaitsi Raion on 19 July 2020, the village became part of the Ternopil Raion.

== Religion ==
- Church of the Intercession (1888, wooden).

== Sources ==
- (in Ukrainian) Уніят В., Мозолівка // Ternopil Encyclopedic Dictionary: in 4 v. / editorial board: H. Yavorskyi and other, Ternopil: "Zbruch", 2005, V. 2: К—О, S. 546. — ISBN 966-528-199-2.
- "Mozoliwka". Geographical Dictionary of the Kingdom of Poland (in Polish). 6. Warszawa: Kasa im. Józefa Mianowskiego. 1885. p. 754.
- "Mądzelówka". Geographical Dictionary of the Kingdom of Poland (in Polish). 6. Warszawa: Kasa im. Józefa Mianowskiego. 1885. p. 216.
