= Siltse, Ternopil Oblast =

Rural locality in Ternopil Oblast, Ukraine

Siltse Сільце
- Location in Ternopil Oblast
- Coordinates: 49°15′21″N 25°8′54″E
- Country: Ukraine
- Oblast: Ternopil Oblast
- Raion: Ternopil Raion
- Hromada: Pidhaitsi urban hromada
- Time zone: UTC+2 (EET)
  - Summer (DST): UTC+3 (EEST)
- Postal code: 48005

Siltse (Ukrainian: Сільце) is a village in Pidhaitsi urban hromada, Ternopil Raion, Ternopil Oblast, Ukraine.

== History ==
The first written mention of the village was in 1460.

After the liquidation of the Pidhaitsi Raion on 19 July 2020, the village became part of the Ternopil Raion.

== Religion ==
- Two churches of St. Peter and St. Paul (UGCC, 1996; OCU, 1997).

== Notable residents ==
- Seweryn Morawski (1819–1900), Roman Catholic bishop and public figure

== Sources ==
- (in Ukrainian) Ригайло І., Уніят В., Сільце // Ternopil Encyclopedic Dictionary: in 4 v. / editorial board: H. Yavorskyi and other, Ternopil: "Zbruch", 2008, V. 3: П—Я, S. 253. — ISBN 978-966-528-279-2.
- "Siółko, przedmieścia Podhajec". Geographical Dictionary of the Kingdom of Poland (in Polish). 10. Warszawa: Kasa im. Józefa Mianowskiego. 1889. p. 623.
