= Lytvyniv Monastery =

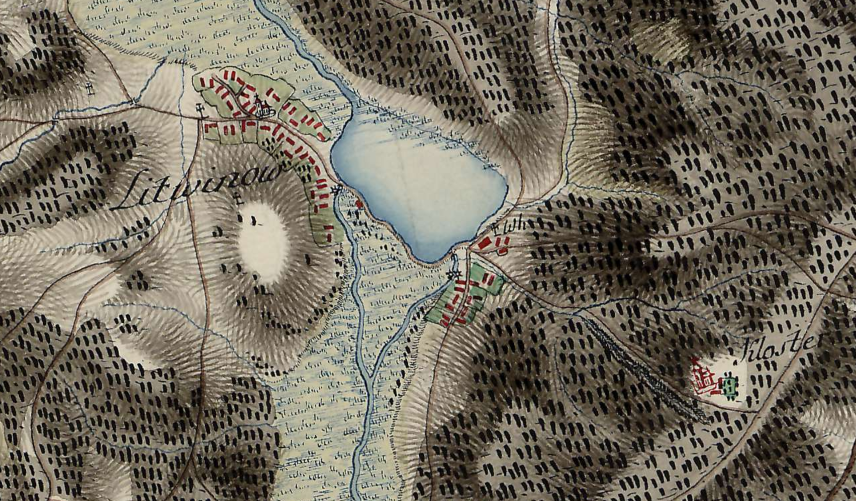
Lytvyniv and the Holy Trinity Monastery in the forest on the von Mieg Map, 18th century.

The Holy Trinity Monastery (Ukrainian: Литвинівський монастир Святої Трійці) is a lost Basilian monastery of the Ukrainian Greek Catholic Church. It was located in the forest on a hill above the village of Lytvyniv, in the Pidhaitsi Hromada, Ternopil Raion, Ternopil Oblast.

== History ==
It was first mentioned in the Akta Grodzkie i Ziemskie in 1586. Information about the ktitors (founders) and the original foundation documents were lost during the Tatar raids in the mid-17th century.

According to a visitation in 1764, the monastery complex consisted of a stone-built, three-section Holy Trinity Church with three masonry domes. At that time, it required repair to the roof and walls, which had been damaged by moisture. Inside the church, there was the main altar and two side altars: the Holy Trinity, the Beheading of Saint John the Baptist, and Saint Onuphrius. Next to the church stood a wooden bell tower on a stone foundation with four bells. The residential cells, which housed five monks in 1724, were built of clay, whitewashed, and covered with a thatched roof, including five cells, three of which were inhabited.

== Monastery economy ==
The monastery's economy was quite modest. An inventory compiled by the Hegumen Yeronim Dunaievskyi in the Ruthenian language in 1729 testified that the cloister owned only small plots of land: arable fields, orchards, gardens, and meadows. The service buildings were equally simple: two small barns, a granary, and a stable with a coach house. All these buildings were constructed of brushwood and covered with straw. The monastery also maintained an apiary which numbered thirty-three hives. Six families of cottagers settled beneath the monastery.

In December 1764, the Lytvyniv Monastery was subordinated to the Zavaliv Monastery, which actually marked the beginning of its decline.

== Liquidation ==
According to the "Revision of Hegumens" from 1724, the monastery "existed without any rights", having five monks led by Hegumen Isaiia Dunaievskyi. Due to the inability to documentarily confirm its land ownership rights, the Lytvyniv Monastery was finally liquidated on 12 April 1774.

After the liquidation, its property was dispersed among other cloisters. Specifically, some of the assets—the Great Altar (without painted decoration), the wooden gilded icon "The Beheading of Saint John the Baptist", a small Deesis, fifteen windows, and the 1729 inventory—were transferred to the Zavaliv Monastery. Three of the monastery's bells were given to the Liubarskyi Monastery, and the miraculous icon of Saint Onuphrius was transferred to the Vytsynskyi Monastery.

The stone church remained on site as late as the mid-19th century. To this day, only its ruins (the northern wall of the nave and a fragment of the narthex/babinets) and one 18th-century stone cross in the old monastic cemetery remain, serving as evidence of the ancient cloister's existence.

== Gallery ==
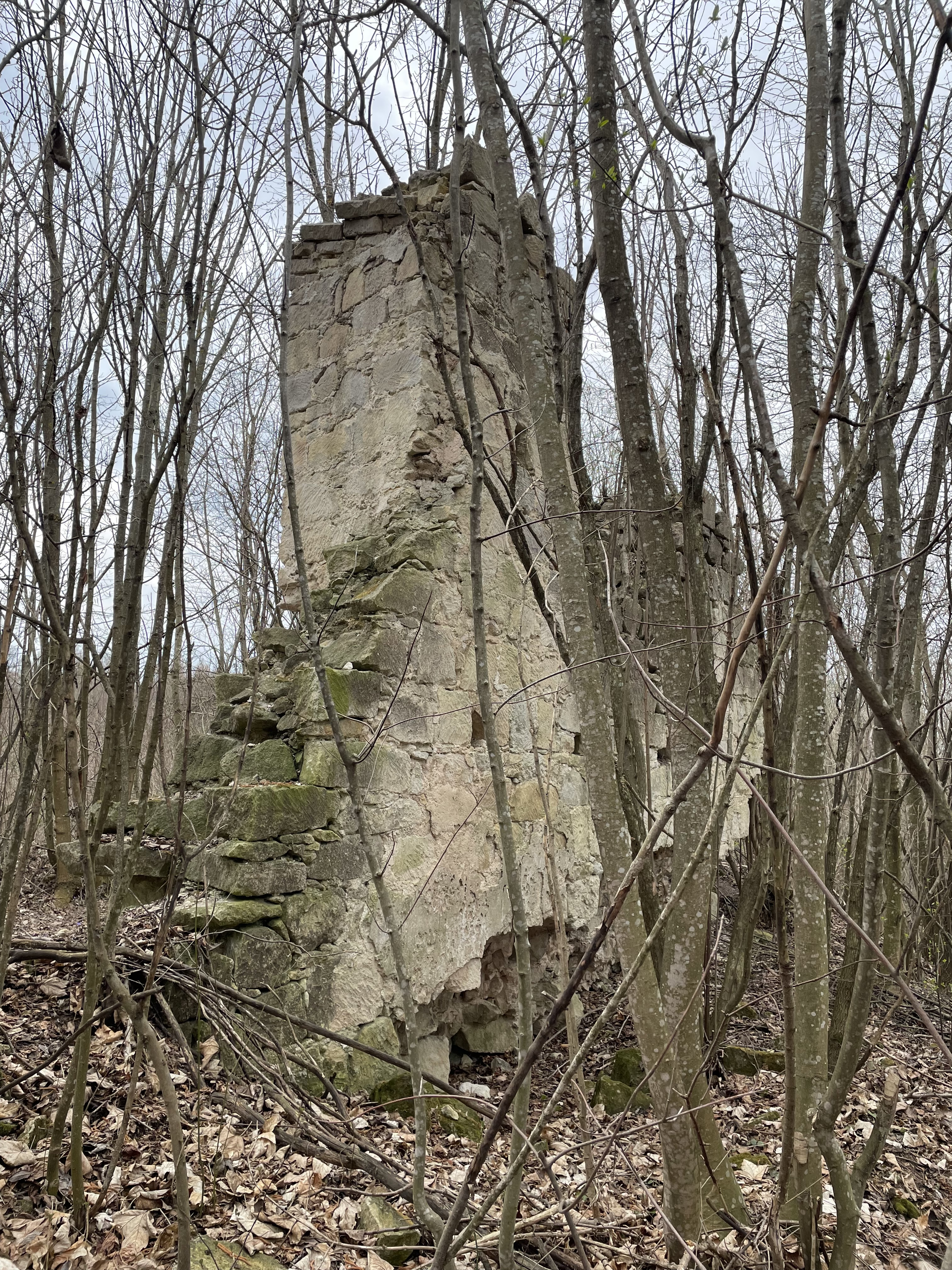
The remains of the monastery walls.

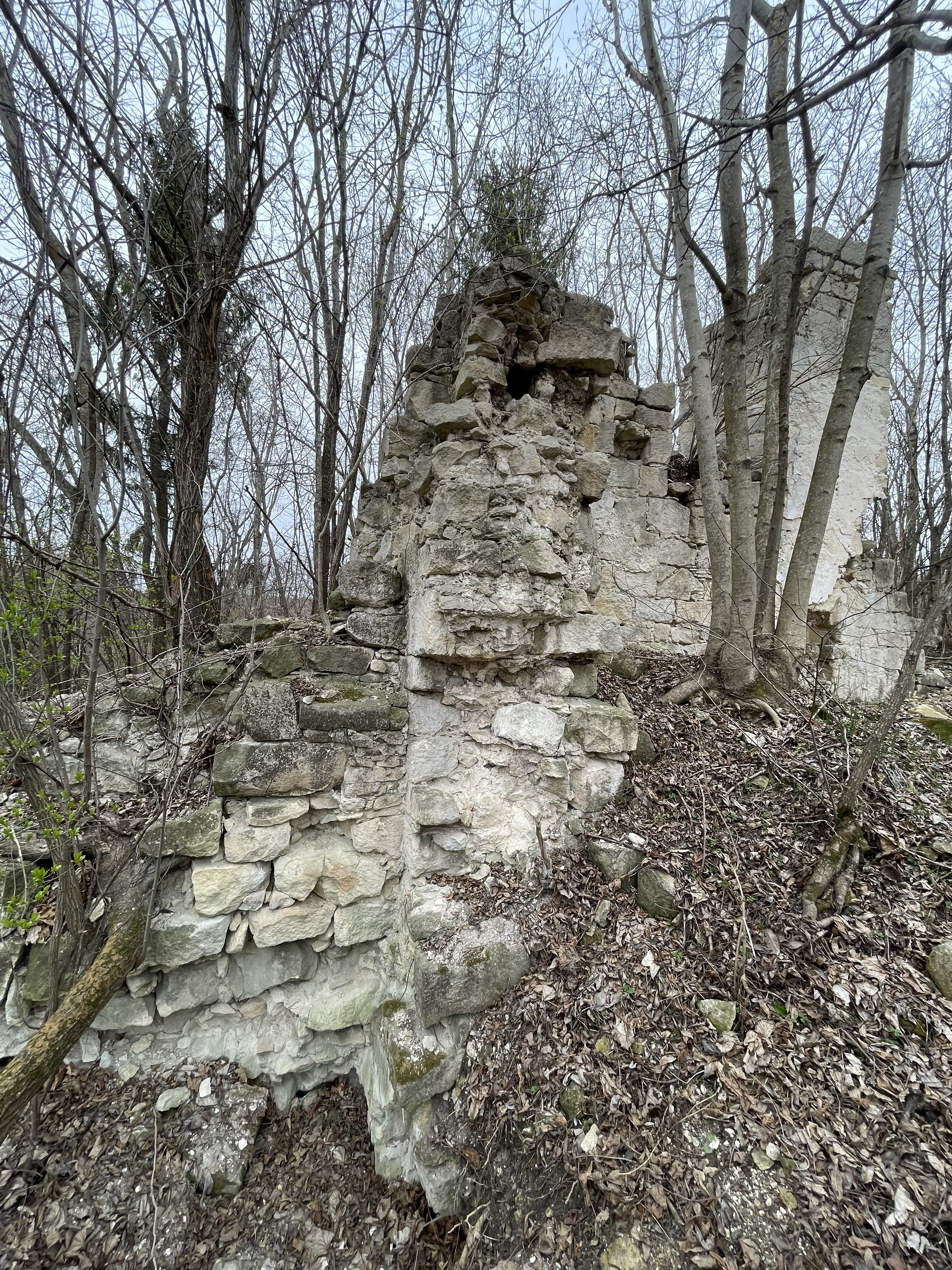
Remains of the monastery walls.
