= Bronhalivka =

Rural locality in Ternopil Oblast, Ukraine

Bronhalivka Бронгалівка
- Location in Ternopil Oblast
- Coordinates: 49°17′29″N 25°17′14″E
- Country: Ukraine
- Oblast: Ternopil Oblast
- Raion: Ternopil Raion
- Hromada: Pidhaitsi urban hromada
- Time zone: UTC+2 (EET)
  - Summer (DST): UTC+3 (EEST)
- Postal code: 48005

Bronhalivka (Ukrainian: Бронгалівка) is a village in Pidhaitsi urban hromada, Ternopil Raion, Ternopil Oblast, Ukraine.

== History ==
The village has been known from the beginning of the 19th century.

After the liquidation of the Pidhaitsi Raion on 19 July 2020, the village became part of the Ternopil Raion.

== Religion ==
- Church of the Intercession (1994, brick; consecrated in 2013).

== Sources ==
- (in Ukrainian) Дем'янова І., Пона І., Бронгалівка // Ternopil Encyclopedic Dictionary: in 4 v. / editorial board: H. Yavorskyi and other, Ternopil: "Zbruch", 2004, V. 1: А—Й, S. 188. — ISBN 966-528-197-6.
