= Yablunivka, Ternopil Oblast =

Rural locality in Ternopil Oblast, Ukraine

Yablunivka Яблунівка
- Location in Ternopil Oblast
- Coordinates: 49°13′34″N 25°3′51″E
- Country: Ukraine
- Oblast: Ternopil Oblast
- Raion: Ternopil Raion
- Hromada: Pidhaitsi urban hromada
- Time zone: UTC+2 (EET)
  - Summer (DST): UTC+3 (EEST)
- Postal code: 48020

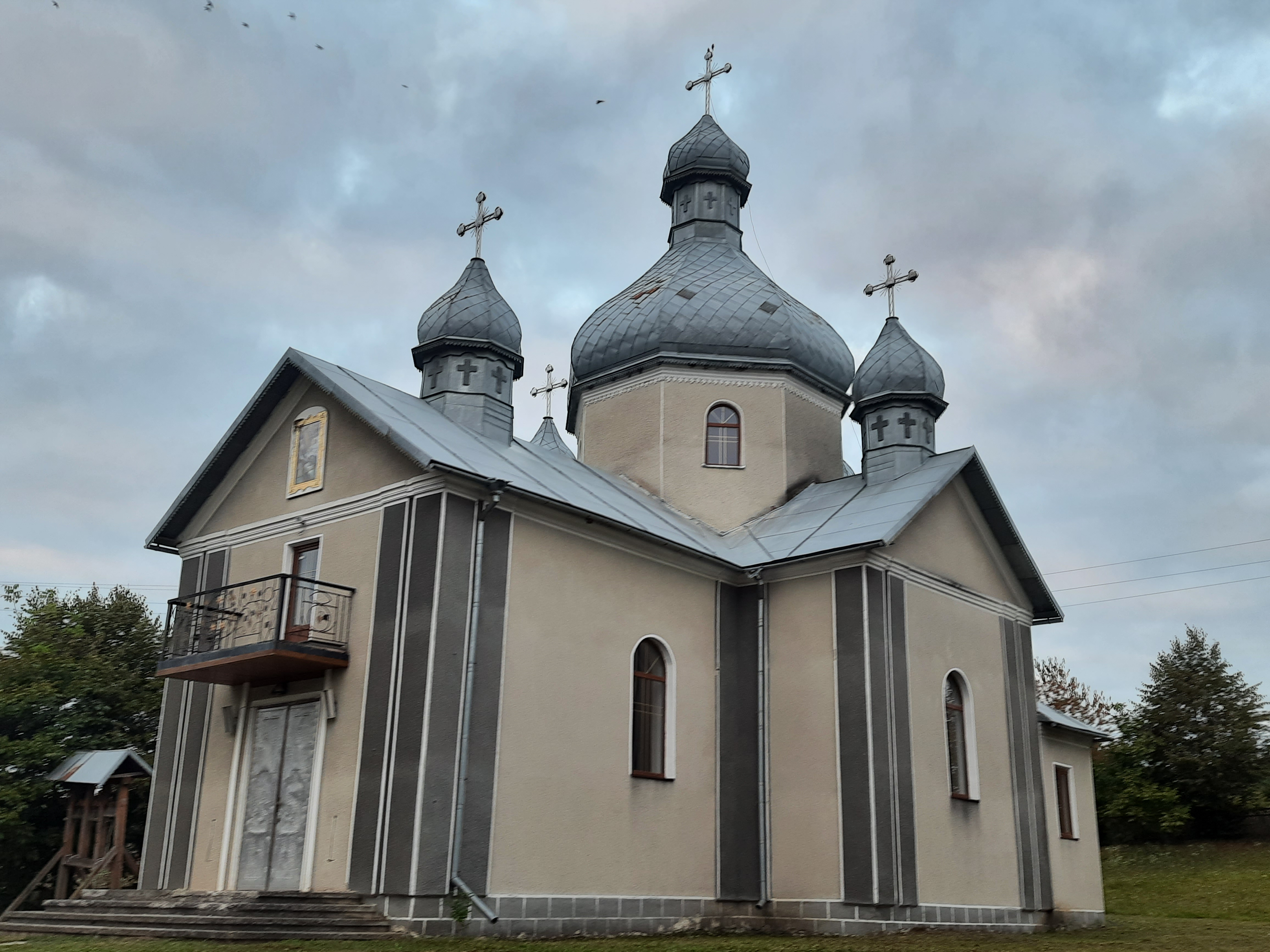
Church of the Nativity of John the Baptist (1994) Yablunivka, Ternopil district, Ternopil region

Yablunivka (Ukrainian: Яблунівка) is a village in Pidhaitsi urban hromada, Ternopil Raion, Ternopil Oblast, Ukraine.

== History ==
The first written mention of the village was in 1450.

After the liquidation of the Pidhaitsi Raion on 19 July 2020, the village became part of the Ternopil Raion.

== Religion ==
- Church of the Nativity of St. John the Baptist (1994, brick).

== Sources ==
- (in Ukrainian) Ковальков Ю., Мельничук Б., Яблунівка // Ternopil Encyclopedic Dictionary: in 4 v. / editorial board: H. Yavorskyi and other, Ternopil: "Zbruch", 2008, V. 3: П—Я, S. 676. — ISBN 978-966-528-279-2.
- "Jabłonówka 2.) wieś, powiat podhajecki". Geographical Dictionary of the Kingdom of Poland (in Polish). 3. Warszawa: Kasa im. Józefa Mianowskiego. 1882. p. 351.
