= Zastavche =

Rural locality in Ternopil Oblast, Ukraine

Zastavche Заставче
- Location in Ternopil Oblast
- Coordinates: 49°12′42″N 25°2′5″E
- Country: Ukraine
- Oblast: Ternopil Oblast
- Raion: Ternopil Raion
- Hromada: Pidhaitsi urban hromada
- Time zone: UTC+2 (EET)
  - Summer (DST): UTC+3 (EEST)
- Postal code: 48023

Zastavche (Ukrainian: Заставче) is a village in Pidhaitsi urban hromada, Ternopil Raion, Ternopil Oblast, Ukraine.

== History ==
The first written mention of the village was in 1449.

After the liquidation of the Pidhaitsi Raion on 19 July 2020, the village became part of the Ternopil Raion.

== Religion ==
- St. George church (1832).

== Sources ==
- (in Ukrainian) Ternopil Encyclopedic Dictionary: in 4 v. / editorial board: H. Yavorskyi and other, Ternopil: "Zbruch", 2004–2010. — ISBN 966-528-197-6.
- "Zastawce, Zastawcze 3.), wieś, powiat podhajecki". Geographical Dictionary of the Kingdom of Poland (in Polish). 14. Warszawa: Kasa im. Józefa Mianowskiego. 1895. p. 451.
