= Holhocha =

Village in Ternopil Oblast, Ukraine

Holhocha Голгоча
- Location in Ternopil Oblast
- Coordinates: 49°11′22″N 25°9′10″E
- Country: Ukraine
- Oblast: Ternopil Oblast
- Raion: Ternopil Raion
- Hromada: Pidhaitsi Hromada
- Postal code: 48024

Holhocha (Ukrainian: Голгоча) is a village in Pidhaitsi urban hromada, Ternopil Raion, Ternopil Oblast, Ukraine.

== History ==
The first written mention of the village dates back to 1435.

After the liquidation of the Pidhaitsi Raion on 19 July 2020, the village became part of the Ternopil Raion.

== Religion ==
- Saints Cosmas and Damian church (2nd half of the 18th century, UGCC)
- Saint Michael church (1990s, OCU)

== People ==
- Hryhorii Petryshyn (1934–1998), Ukrainian priest, protoiereus, writer
