= Lysa =

Rural locality in Ternopil Oblast, Ukraine

Lysa Лиса
- Location in Ternopil Oblast
- Coordinates: 49°14′32″N 25°1′2″E
- Country: Ukraine
- Oblast: Ternopil Oblast
- Raion: Ternopil Raion
- Hromada: Pidhaitsi urban hromada
- Time zone: UTC+2 (EET)
  - Summer (DST): UTC+3 (EEST)
- Postal code: 48033

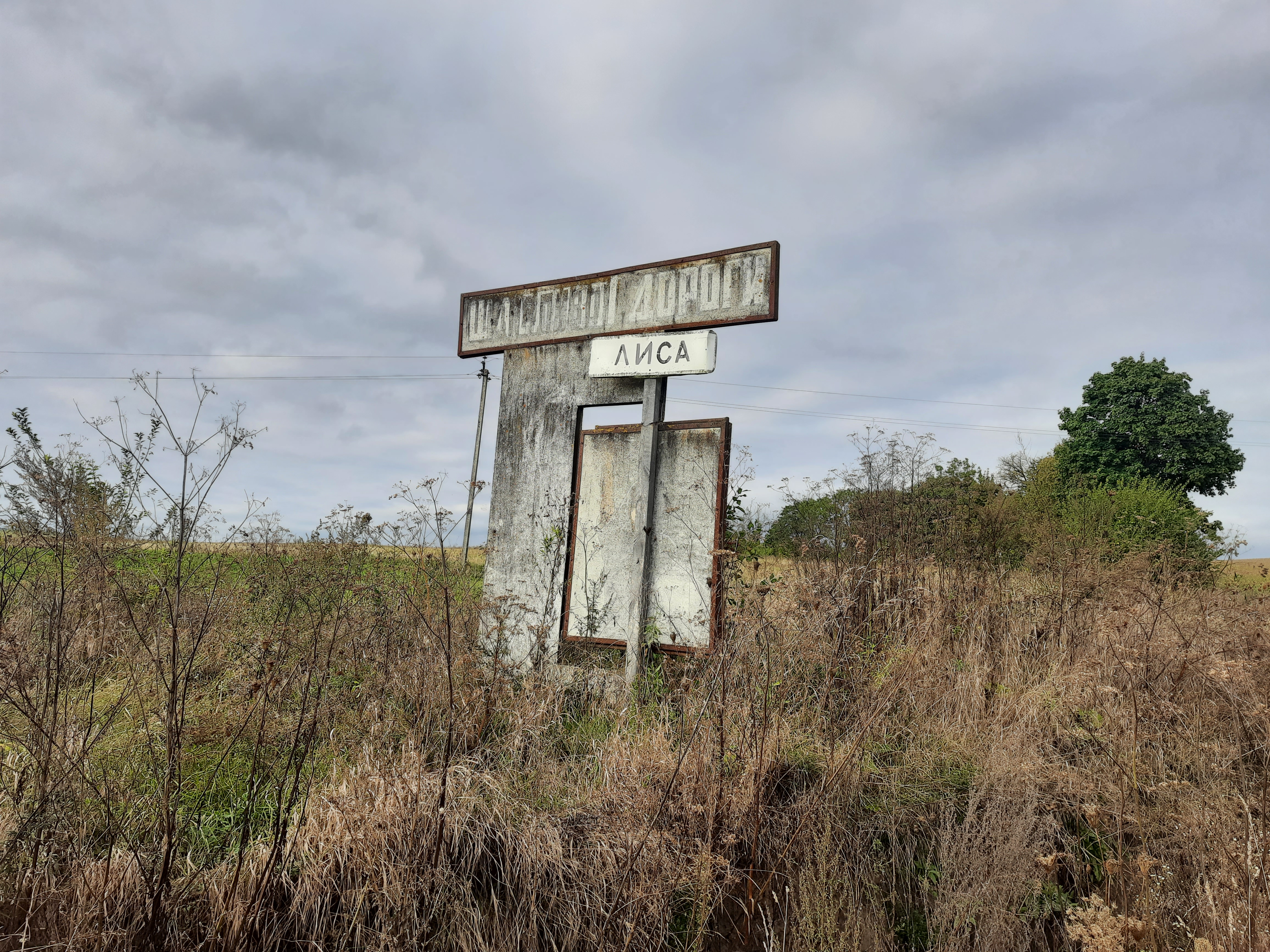

Lysa (Ukrainian: Лиса) is a village in Pidhaitsi urban hromada, Ternopil Raion, Ternopil Oblast, Ukraine.

== History ==
The village is known from the 16th century.

After the liquidation of the Pidhaitsi Raion on 19 July 2020, the village became part of the Ternopil Raion.

== Religion ==
- St. Michael church (1883).

== Sources ==
- (in Ukrainian) Онишкевич П., Хаварівський Б., Лиса // Ternopil Encyclopedic Dictionary: in 4 v. / editorial board: H. Yavorskyi and other, Ternopil: "Zbruch", 2005, V. 2: К—О, S. 358. — ISBN 966-528-199-2.
- "Łysa (1), pow. podhajecki". Geographical Dictionary of the Kingdom of Poland (in Polish). 5. Warszawa: Kasa im. Józefa Mianowskiego. 1884. p. 851.
