= Bilokrynytsia, Pidhaitsi urban hromada, Ternopil Raion, Ternopil Oblast =

Rural locality in Ternopil Oblast, Ukraine

Bilokrynytsia Білокриниця
- Location in Ternopil Oblast
- Coordinates: 49°16′57″N 25°12′36″E
- Country: Ukraine
- Oblast: Ternopil Oblast
- Raion: Ternopil Raion
- Hromada: Pidhaitsi urban hromada
- Time zone: UTC+2 (EET)
  - Summer (DST): UTC+3 (EEST)
- Postal code: 48012

Bilokrynytsia (Ukrainian: Білокриниця) is a village in Pidhaitsi urban hromada, Ternopil Raion, Ternopil Oblast, Ukraine.

== History ==
The first written mention of the village was in 1447.

After the liquidation of the Pidhaitsi Raion on 19 July 2020, the village became part of the Ternopil Raion.

== Religion ==
- St. Paraskeva church (1904–1945 – Roman Catholic Church of St. Peter and Paul).

== Sources ==
- (in Ukrainian) Буняк І., Уніят В., Білокриниця // Ternopil Encyclopedic Dictionary: in 4 v. / editorial board: H. Yavorskyi and other, Ternopil: "Zbruch", 2004, V. 1: А—Й, S. 136. — ISBN 966-528-197-6.
- "Białokiernica 1) wieś, powiat podhajecki". Geographical Dictionary of the Kingdom of Poland (in Polish). 1. Warszawa: Kasa im. Józefa Mianowskiego. 1880. p. 190.
