= Zahaitsi =

Rural locality in Ternopil Oblast, Ukraine

Zahaitsi Загайці
- Location in Ternopil Oblast
- Coordinates: 49°16′51″N 25°9′11″E
- Country: Ukraine
- Oblast: Ternopil Oblast
- Raion: Ternopil Raion
- Hromada: Pidhaitsi urban hromada
- Time zone: UTC+2 (EET)
  - Summer (DST): UTC+3 (EEST)
- Postal code: 48000

Zahaitsi (Ukrainian: Загайці) is a village in Pidhaitsi urban hromada, Ternopil Raion, Ternopil Oblast, Ukraine.

== History ==
The first written mention of the village was in 1472.

After the liquidation of the Pidhaitsi Raion on 19 July 2020, the village became part of the Ternopil Raion.

== Sources ==
- (in Ukrainian) Врублевич Н., Загайці // Ternopil Encyclopedic Dictionary: in 4 v. / editorial board: H. Yavorskyi and other, Ternopil: "Zbruch", 2004, V. 1: А—Й, S. 594. — ISBN 966-528-197-6.
- (in Ukrainian) Колодницький С., Коропецька У., Мельничук Б., Загайці // Ternopil Oblast. History of cities and villages: in 3 v. / Ternopil: "Terno-graph", 2014, V. 3: М—Ш, S. 182. — ISBN 978-966-457-246-7.
- "Zahajce, wś, pow. podhajecki". Geographical Dictionary of the Kingdom of Poland (in Polish). 14. Warszawa: Kasa im. Józefa Mianowskiego. 1895. p. 278.
