= Panovychi =

Rural locality in Ternopil Oblast, Ukraine

Panovychi Пановичі
- Location in Ternopil Oblast
- Coordinates: 49°11′1″N 24°58′6″E
- Country: Ukraine
- Oblast: Ternopil Oblast
- Raion: Ternopil Raion
- Hromada: Pidhaitsi urban hromada
- Time zone: UTC+2 (EET)
  - Summer (DST): UTC+3 (EEST)
- Postal code: 48034

Panovychi (Ukrainian: Пановичі) is a village in Pidhaitsi urban hromada, Ternopil Raion, Ternopil Oblast, Ukraine.

== History ==
In the 18th century, Polish colonists settled on the territory of the present village.

After the liquidation of the Pidhaitsi Raion on 19 July 2020, the village became part of the Ternopil Raion.

== Religion ==
- Saint Peter and Paul church (1935, reconstructed from a Roman Catholic church in 1991).

== Sources ==
- (in Ukrainian) Гуцал П., Уніят В., Пановичі // Ternopil Encyclopedic Dictionary: in 4 v. / editorial board: H. Yavorskyi and other, Ternopil: "Zbruch", 2008, V. 3: П—Я, S. 23. — ISBN 978-966-528-279-2.
- "Hnilcze (z Sieniawką i Panowicami)". Geographical Dictionary of the Kingdom of Poland (in Polish). 3. Warszawa: Kasa im. Józefa Mianowskiego. 1882. p. 81.

}
