= Staryi Lytvyniv =

Rural locality in Ternopil Oblast, Ukraine

Staryi Lytvyniv Старий Литвинів
- Location in Ternopil Oblast
- Coordinates: 49°17′15″N 24°58′31″E
- Country: Ukraine
- Oblast: Ternopil Oblast
- Raion: Ternopil Raion
- Hromada: Pidhaitsi urban hromada
- Time zone: UTC+2 (EET)
  - Summer (DST): UTC+3 (EEST)
- Postal code: 48030

Staryi Lytvyniv (Ukrainian: Старий Литвинів) is a village in Pidhaitsi urban hromada, Ternopil Raion, Ternopil Oblast, Ukraine.

== History ==
The first written mention of the village was in 1414.

After the liquidation of the Pidhaitsi Raion on 19 July 2020, the village became part of the Ternopil Raion.

== Sources ==
- (in Ukrainian) Кунька Г., Старий Литвинів // Ternopil Encyclopedic Dictionary: in 4 v. / editorial board: H. Yavorskyi and other, Ternopil: "Zbruch", 2008, V. 3: П—Я, S. 332. — ISBN 978-966-528-279-2.
- "Litwinów". Geographical Dictionary of the Kingdom of Poland (in Polish). 5. Warszawa: Kasa im. Józefa Mianowskiego. 1884. p. 350–351.
