= Stepove, Ternopil Oblast =

Rural locality in Ternopil Oblast, Ukraine

Stepove Степове
- Location in Ternopil Oblast
- Coordinates: 49°19′46″N 25°15′12″E
- Country: Ukraine
- Oblast: Ternopil Oblast
- Raion: Ternopil Raion
- Hromada: Pidhaitsi urban hromada
- Time zone: UTC+2 (EET)
  - Summer (DST): UTC+3 (EEST)
- Postal code: 48013

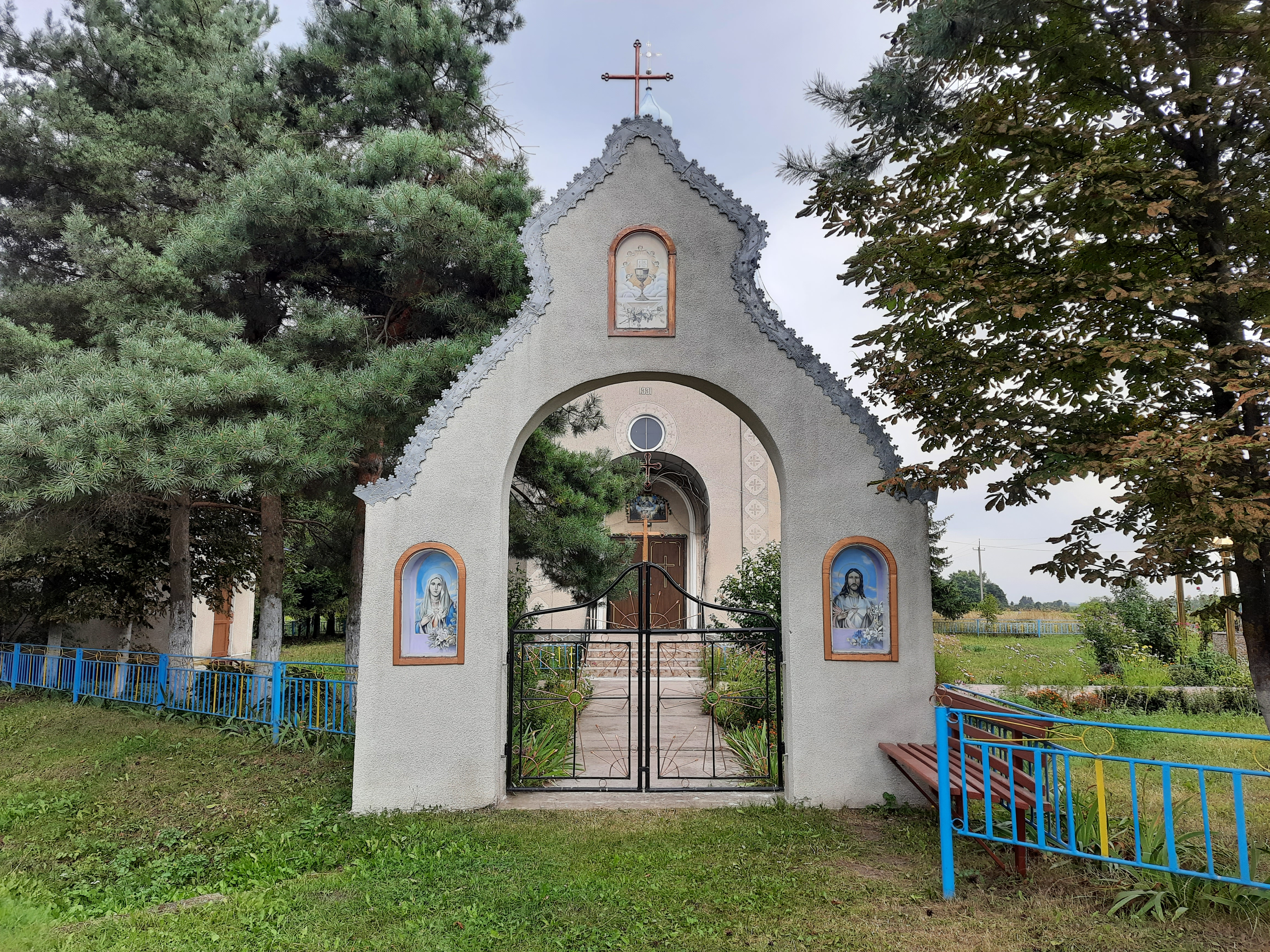
Church of the Holy Trinity in Stepove, Ukraine

Stepove (Ukrainian: Степове; until 1977, Ryhailykha) is a village in Pidhaitsi urban hromada, Ternopil Raion, Ternopil Oblast, Ukraine.

== History ==
The first written mention of the village was in 1870.

After the liquidation of the Pidhaitsi Raion on 19 July 2020, the village became part of the Ternopil Raion.

== Religion ==
- Holy Trinity Church (1992).

== Sources ==
- (in Ukrainian) Уніят В., Степове // Ternopil Encyclopedic Dictionary: in 4 v. / editorial board: H. Yavorskyi and other, Ternopil: "Zbruch", 2008, V. 3: П—Я, S. 346. — ISBN 978-966-528-279-2.
