= Bilokrynytsia =

Bilokrynytsia (Ukrainian: Білокриниця) is a name of several populated places in Ukraine:

- Bilokrynytsia, Kremenets Raion, Ternopil Oblast
- Bilokrynytsia, Pidhaitsi urban hromada, Ternopil Raion, Ternopil Oblast
- Bilokrynytsia, Zaliztsi settlement hromada, Ternopil Raion, Ternopil Oblast
