= Lytvyniv =

Rural locality in Ternopil Oblast, Ukraine

Lytvyniv Литвинів
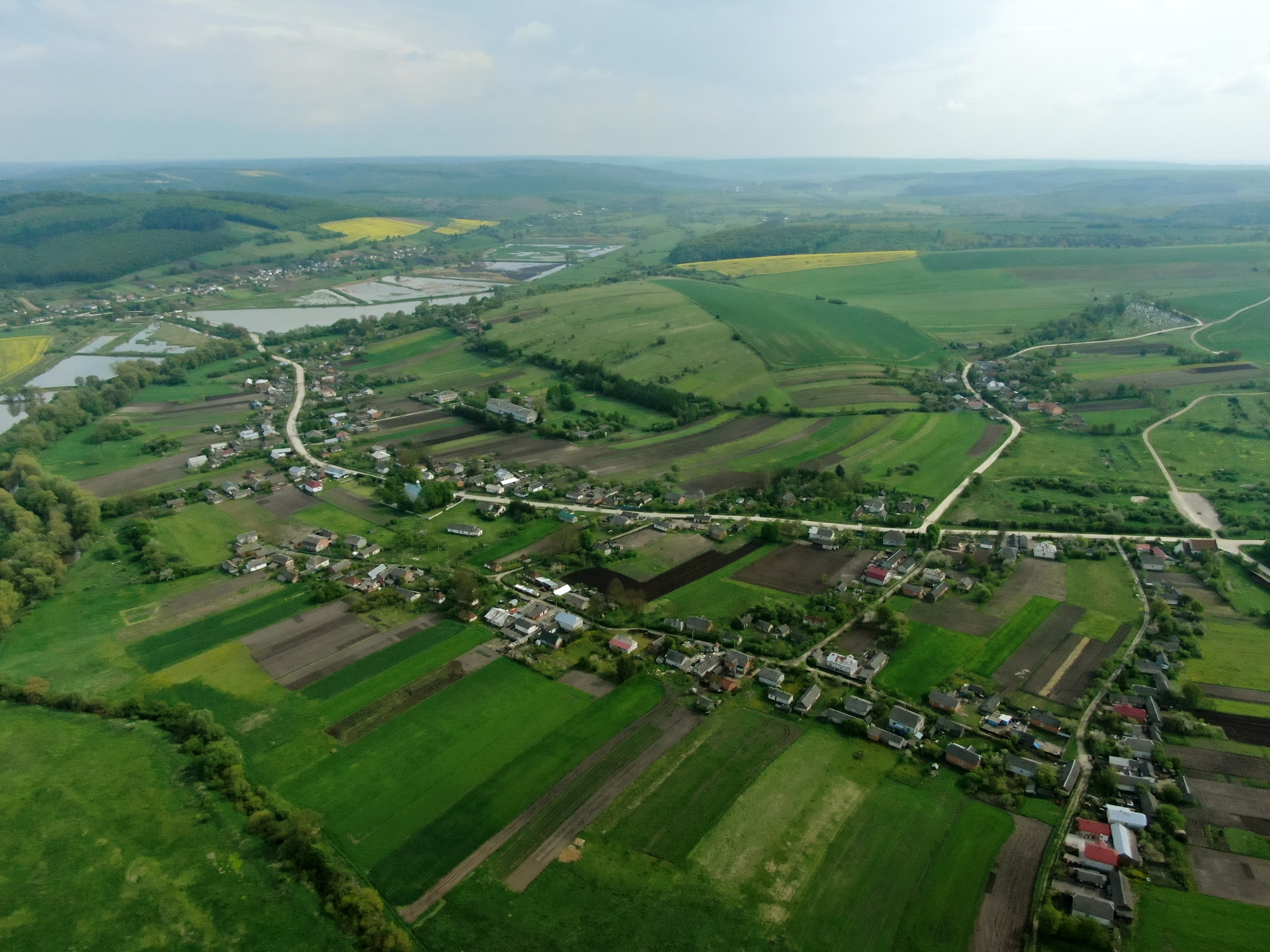
- Lytvyniv

- Location in Ternopil Oblast
- Coordinates: 49°17′19″N 25°1′50″E
- Country: Ukraine
- Oblast: Ternopil Oblast
- Raion: Ternopil Raion
- Hromada: Pidhaitsi urban hromada
- Time zone: UTC+2 (EET)
  - Summer (DST): UTC+3 (EEST)
- Postal code: 48030

Lytvyniv (Ukrainian: Литвинів) is a village in Pidhaitsi urban hromada, Ternopil Raion, Ternopil Oblast, Ukraine.

== History ==
The first written mention of the village was in 1459.

After the liquidation of the Pidhaitsi Raion on 19 July 2020, the village became part of the Ternopil Raion.

== Religion ==
- Church of the Nativity of the Blessed Virgin Mary (1842, brick),
- Roman Catholic church (1930s, brick),
- Holy Trinity Monastery of the Order of St. Basil the Great (15th century, remains preserved).

== Sources ==
- (in Ukrainian) Колодницький С., Кунька Г., Уніят В., Литвинів // Ternopil Encyclopedic Dictionary: in 4 v. / editorial board: H. Yavorskyi and other, Ternopil: "Zbruch", 2005, V. 2: К—О, S. 367—368. — ISBN 966-528-199-2.
- "Litwinów". Geographical Dictionary of the Kingdom of Poland (in Polish). 5. Warszawa: Kasa im. Józefa Mianowskiego. 1884. p. 350–351.
