= Stare Misto, Ukraine =

Stare Misto Старе Місто
- Village
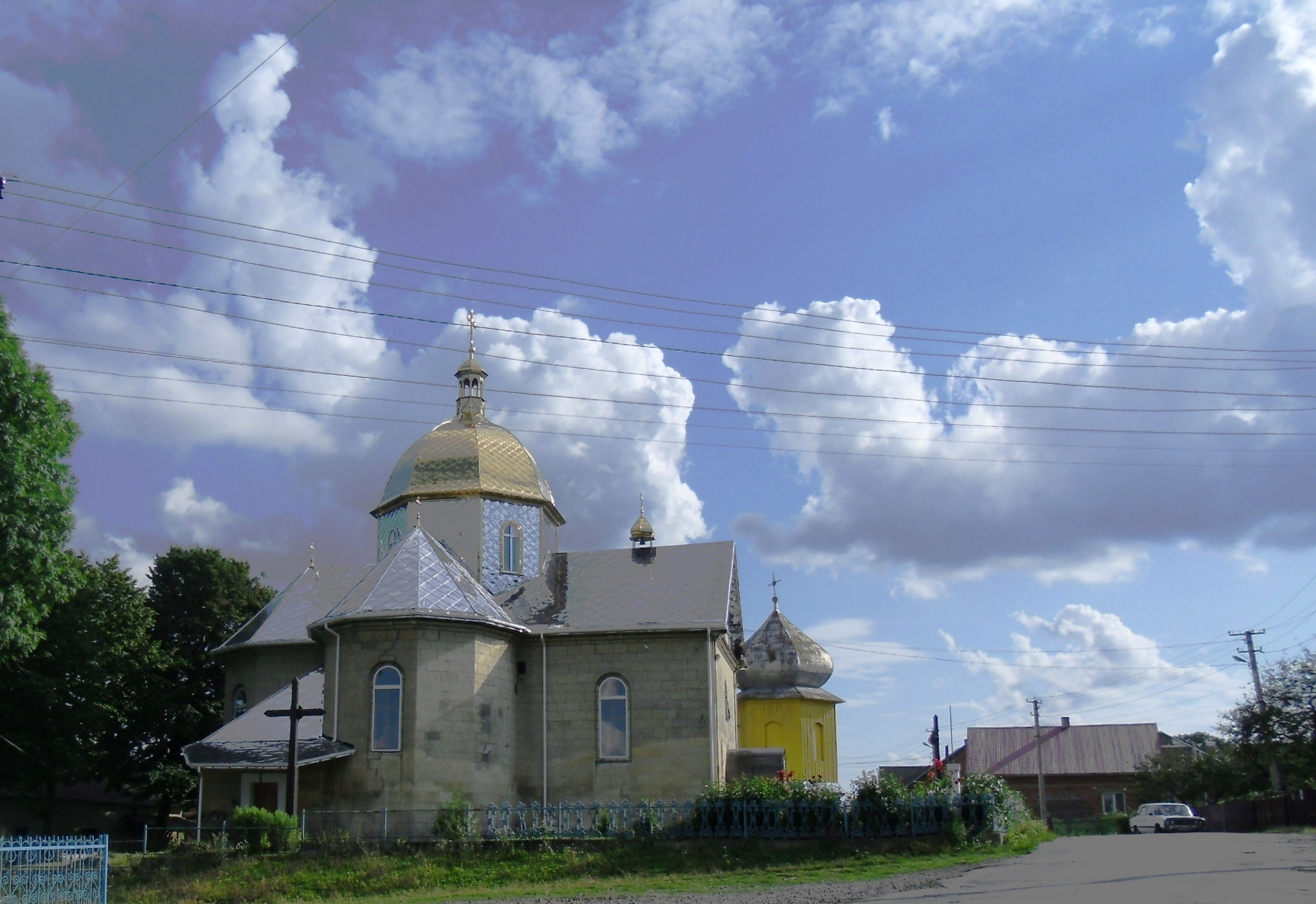

- Location within Ternopil Oblast Location within Ukraine
- Coordinates: 49°16′53″N 25°6′59″E
- Country: Ukraine
- Oblast: Ternopil Oblast
- Raion: Ternopil Raion
- Area: 29.961 km^{2} (11.568 sq mi)
- Elevation: 348 m (1,142 ft)
- Population: 1,107
  - Density: 36.51/km^{2} (94.6/sq mi)
- Website: село Старе Місто ^{(Ukrainian)}

Stare Misto (Ukrainian: Старе Місто, lit. 'Old town', Polish: Staremiasto, Stare Podhajce) is a village (selo) in Ternopil Raion, Ternopil Oblast. It lies on the Koropets River. Local government – Staromiska village council. It belongs to Pidhaitsi urban hromada, one of the hromadas of Ukraine. To her subordinated villages Holendra and Zahaytsi. Pop. 1,107.

== History ==
According to the chronicles of the church in the territory of the village Stare Misto in the 14th century there was a settlement with the church. The first written mention of Pidhaytsi is written in the 1st volume of the collection of the medieval documents in 1397.

The territory of the settlement repeatedly has undergone to frequent attacks by foreign invaders. Are known attacks of Tatars in 1516, 1620, 1621, 1633, respectively, of the Polish nobility in the 1618, of Cossacks in 1648, 1653, 1655, respectively. There was a battle between the forces of Peter Doroshenko and Jan Sobieski in the fields near Stare Misto in 1667. Even today, one can find traces of defensive walls and signs fires.

Stari Pidhaitsi was renamed into Stare Misto in 1469.

When the Stare Misto came under the Austrian power, it was already quite restored, having 116 houses in 1785.

The Village was highly developed in the 19th century, especially after the abolition of serfdom in 1848. “Prosvita”, “Sich”, “Ridna Shkola” and other societies were established in the early 20th-century. The slogans of the new-created Ukrainian National Democratic Party promoted the development of populations national consciousness.

Prior to 1990, Stare Misto belonged to Berezhany Raion Until 18 July 2020, Stare Misto belonged to Pidhaitsi Raion. The raion was abolished in July 2020 as part of the administrative reform of Ukraine, which reduced the number of raions of Ternopil Oblast to three. The area of Pidhaitsi Raion was merged into Ternopil Raion.

== Attractions ==
- Church of the Intercession (1854 wood)
- Church of St. George (1931, stone)
- Chapel of St. Pokrova (1995)
- "Figure" of Jesus Christ (1991) and St. Anna (1992)

== Gallery ==
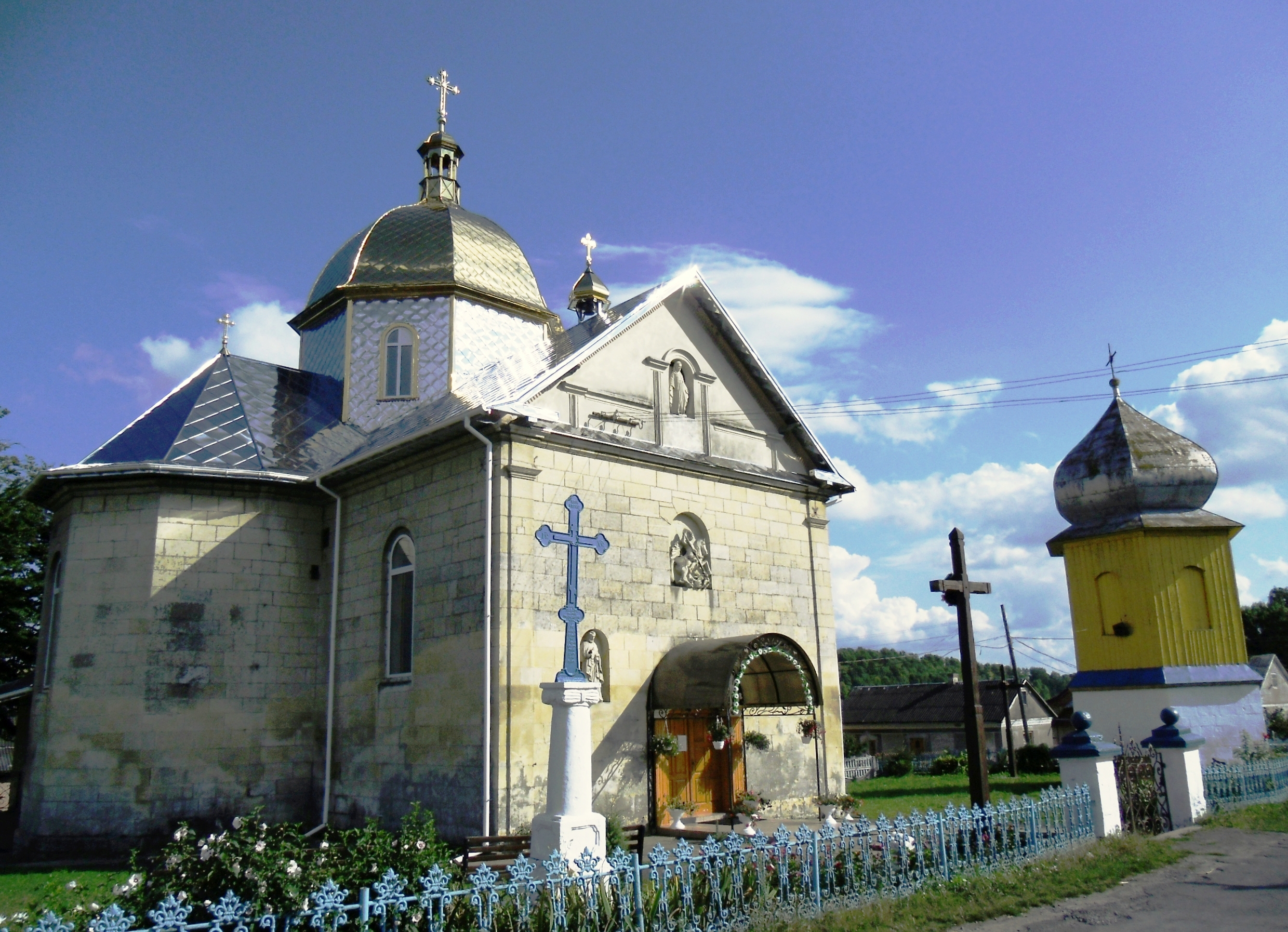
Church of St. George and the bell tower (1931, stone).

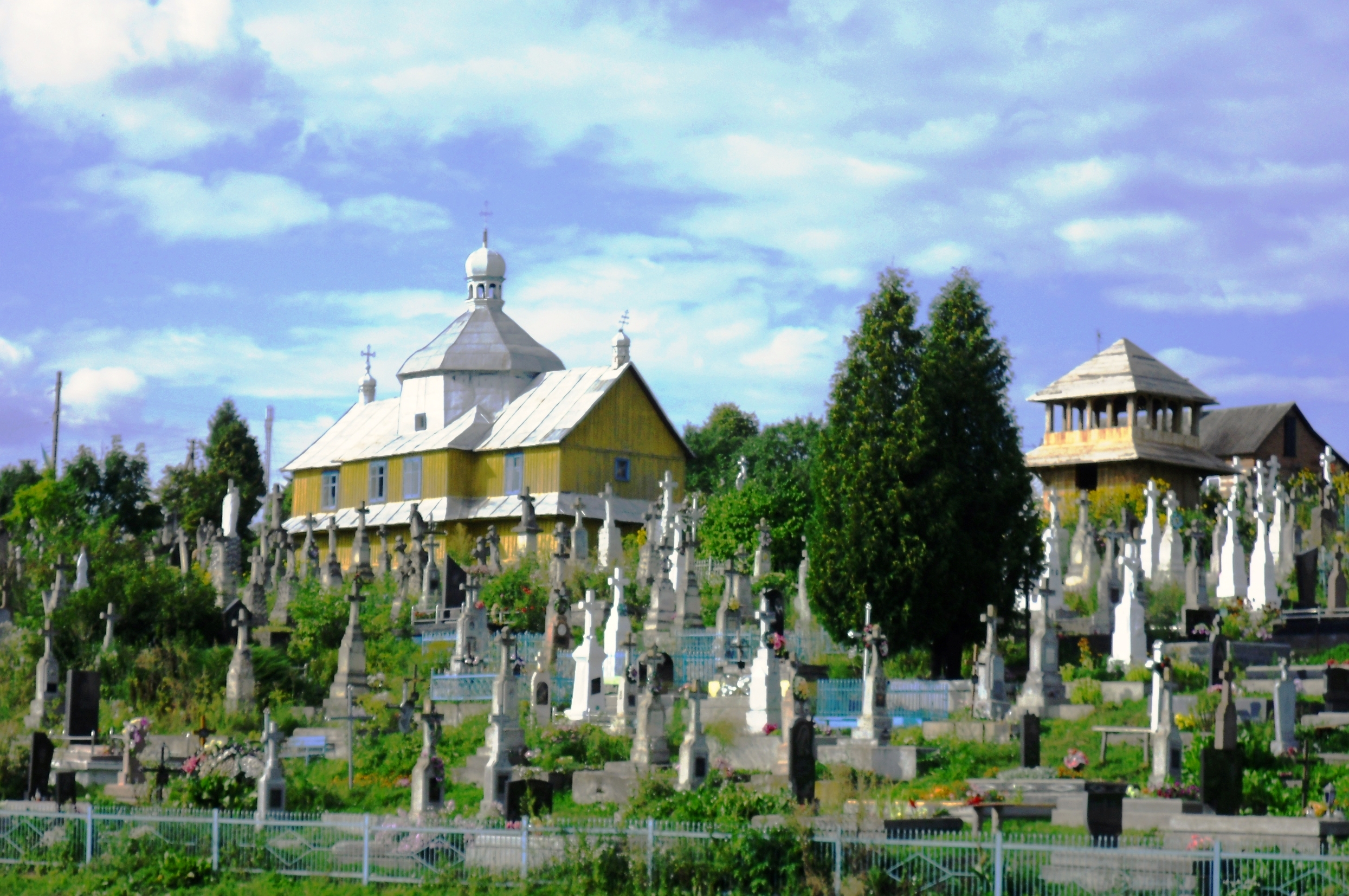
Church of the Intercession (1854 wood) and cemetery.

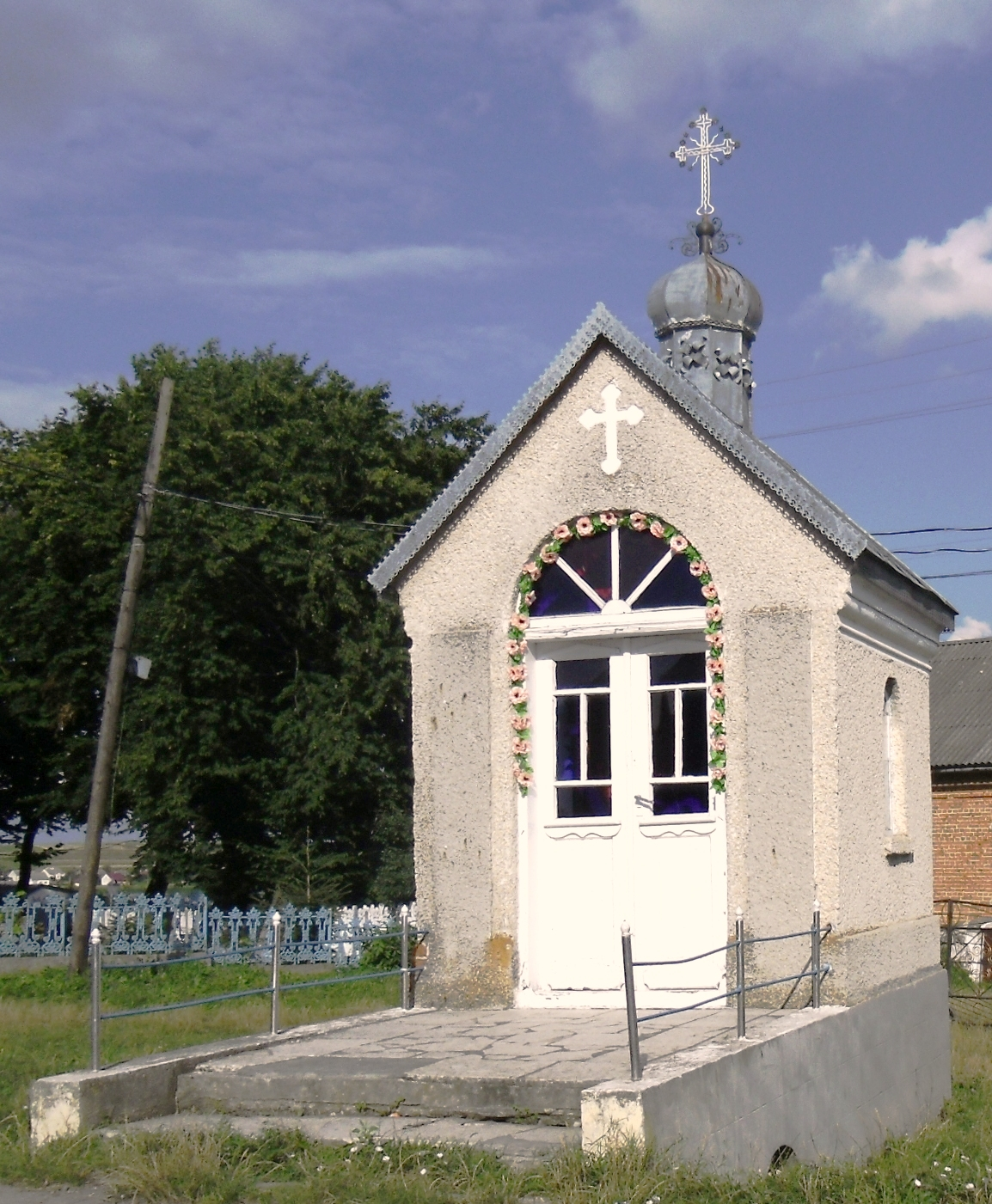
Chapel of St. Pokrova (1995).

== Literature ==
- Ukrainian: Історія міст і сіл УРСР : Тернопільська область. – К. : ГРУРЕ, 1973 р. – 640 с.
- Śladem przodków. Podhajce. Grzegorz Gołębiowski (in Polish)
- (in Ukrainian) В. Уніят, Старе Місто // Ternopil Encyclopedic Dictionary: in 4 v. / editorial board: H. Yavorskyi and other, Ternopil: "Zbruch", 2008, V. 3: П—Я, S. 331. — ISBN 978-966-528-279-2.
