= Shveikiv =

Rural locality in Ternopil Oblast, Ukraine

Shveikiv Швейків
- Location in Ternopil Oblast
- Coordinates: 49°8′53″N 25°9′43″E
- Country: Ukraine
- Oblast: Ternopil Oblast
- Raion: Chortkiv Raion
- Hromada: Monastyryska urban hromada
- Time zone: UTC+2 (EET)
  - Summer (DST): UTC+3 (EEST)
- Postal code: 48314

Shveikiv (Ukrainian: Швейків) is a village in Monastyryska urban hromada, Chortkiv Raion, Ternopil Oblast, Ukraine.

== History ==
It was first mentioned in writings in 1448.

After the liquidation of the Monastyryska Raion on 19 July 2020, the village became part of the Chortkiv Raion.

== Religion ==
- St. Demetrius church (1900, brick, restored in 2002).

== Famous people ==
- Hryhorii Petryshyn (1934–1998), Ukrainian priest, protoiereus, writer.

== Sources ==
- (in Ukrainian) Бабій Г., Чернихівський Г., Швейків // Ternopil Encyclopedic Dictionary: in 4 v. / editorial board: H. Yavorskyi and other, Ternopil: "Zbruch", 2008, V. 3: П—Я, S. 629. — ISBN 978-966-528-279-2.
- "Szwejków, powiat podhajecki". Geographical Dictionary of the Kingdom of Poland (in Polish). 12. Warszawa: Kasa im. Józefa Mianowskiego. 1892. p. 89.
- "Szwejków, powiat podhajecki". Geographical Dictionary of the Kingdom of Poland (in Polish). p. 648.
