= Zaturyn =

Rural locality in Ternopil Oblast, Ukraine

Zaturyn Затурин
- Location in Ternopil Oblast
- Coordinates: 49°10′48″N 25°3′56″E
- Country: Ukraine
- Oblast: Ternopil Oblast
- Raion: Ternopil Raion
- Hromada: Pidhaitsi urban hromada
- Time zone: UTC+2 (EET)
  - Summer (DST): UTC+3 (EEST)
- Postal code: 48023

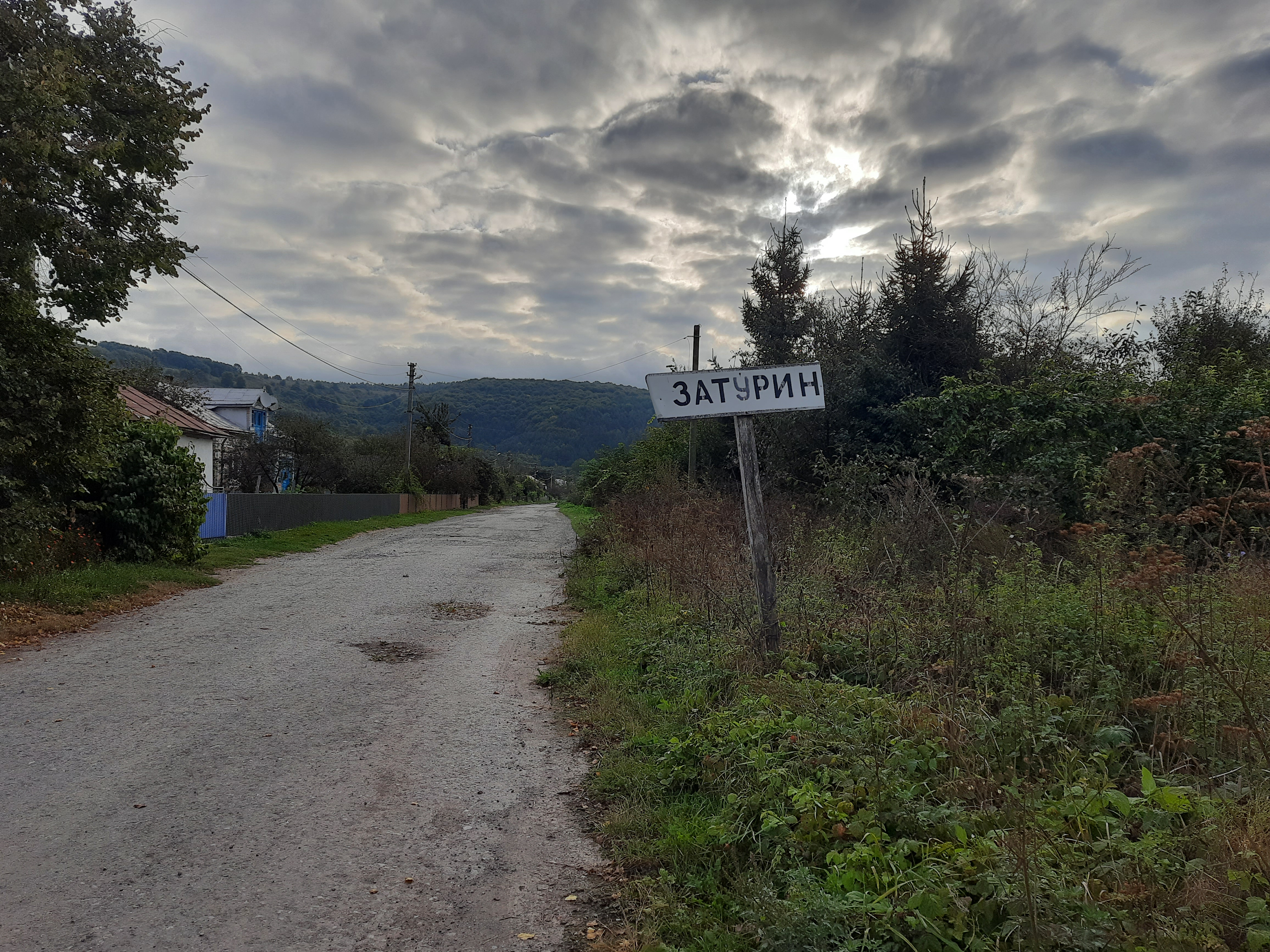
Road sign at the entrance to Zaturyn Village

Zaturyn (Ukrainian: Затурин) is a village in Pidhaitsi urban hromada, Ternopil Raion, Ternopil Oblast, Ukraine.

== History ==
The first written mention of the village was in 1661.

After the liquidation of the Pidhaitsi Raion on 19 July 2020, the village became part of the Ternopil Raion.

== Religion ==
- Church of the Nativity of the Blessed Virgin Mary (1992; brick, OCU),
- Chapel of the Nativity of the Blessed Virgin Mary (2000; brick, UGCC).

== Sources ==
- "Zaturzyn". Geographical Dictionary of the Kingdom of Poland (in Polish). 14. Warszawa: Kasa im. Józefa Mianowskiego. 1895. p. 466.
