= Stepove, Feodosia Municipality, Crimea =

Stepove
- Village
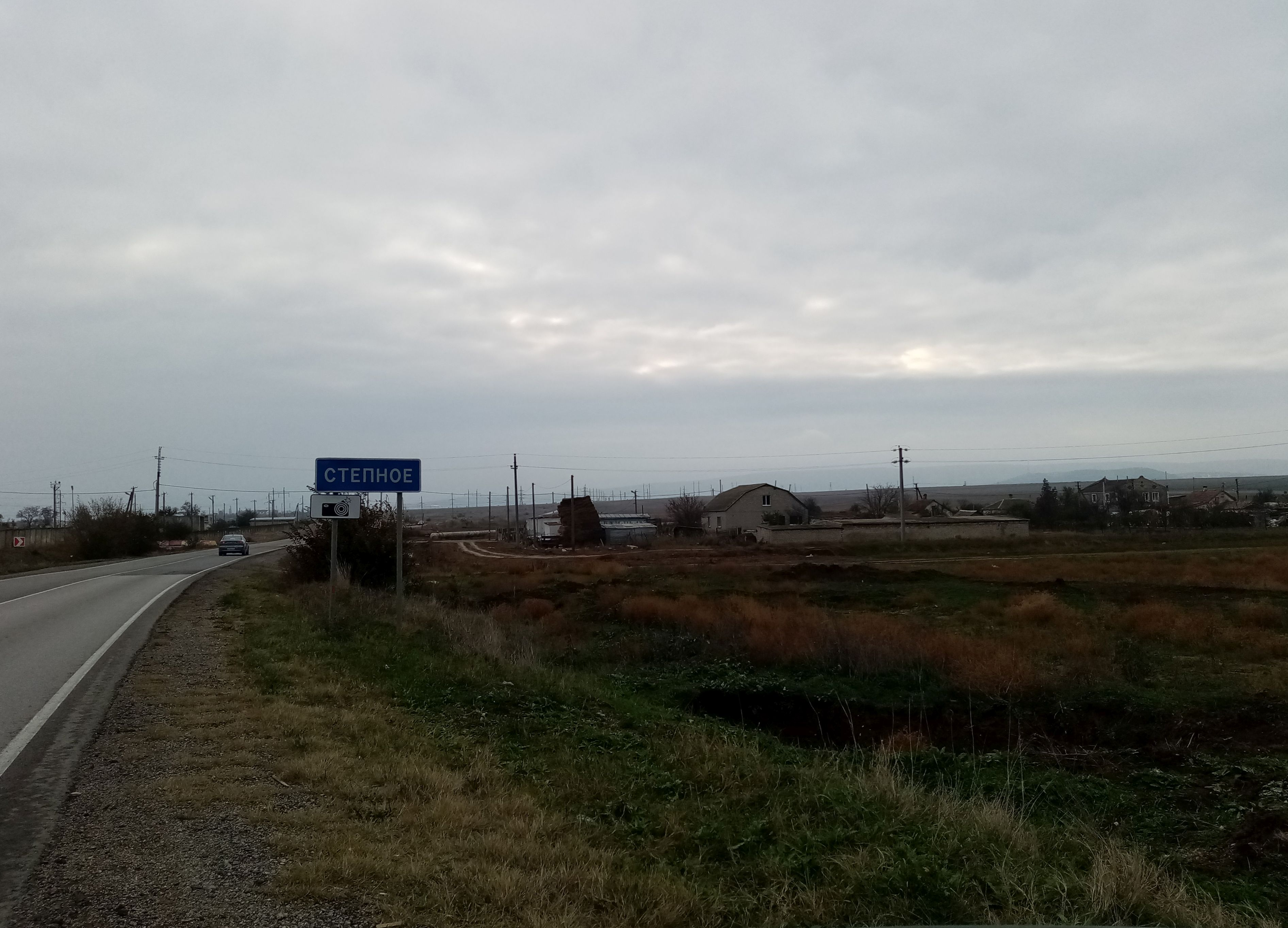
- A sign in Stepove

- Location within Crimea
- Coordinates: 45°5′38″N 35°22′52″E
- Country: Disputed: Ukraine (de jure); Russia (de facto)
- Region: (Autonomous Republic of Crimea) Crimea^{1}
- Municipality: Feodosia
- Elevation: 15 m (49 ft)

Population (2014)
  - Total: 57
- Time zone: UTC+4 (MSK)
- ^{1} Autonomous Republic of Crimea (de jure) or Republic of Crimea (de facto), depending on jurisdiction.

Stepove (Russian: Степное; Ukrainian: Степове, romanized: Stepove; Crimean Tatar: Stepnoye) is a village in Feodosia Municipality, Crimea. Population: 57 (2014 Census). It is located about 7 km (4.3 mi) north of the city of Feodosia.
