= Verbiv, Pidhaitsi urban hromada, Ternopil Raion, Ternopil Oblast =

Rural locality in Ternopil Oblast, Ukraine

Verbiv Вербів
- Interactive map of Verbiv
- Coordinates: 49°31′27″N 24°51′25″E
- Country: Ukraine
- Oblast: Ternopil Oblast
- Raion: Ternopil Raion

Population (2001 census)
  - Total: 968
- Time zone: UTC+2 (EET)
  - Summer (DST): UTC+3 (EEST)
- Postal code: 48022
- Area code: +380 3542

Verbiv (Ukrainian: Вербів) - village in Ternopil Raion of Ternopil Oblast, Ukraine. It belongs to Pidhaitsi urban hromada, one of the hromadas of Ukraine.

Until 18 July 2020, Verbiv belonged to Pidhaitsi Raion. The raion was abolished in July 2020 as part of the administrative reform of Ukraine, which reduced the number of raions of Ternopil Oblast to three. The area of Pidhaitsi Raion was merged into Ternopil Raion.

== Population ==
- Population in 2001: 968 inhabitants.

== Sources ==
- (in Ukrainian) В. Карпович, І. Кушлик, Б. Мельничук., Вербів // Ternopil Encyclopedic Dictionary: in 4 v. / editorial board: H. Yavorskyi and other, Ternopil: "Zbruch", 2004, V. 1: А—Й, S. 245. — ISBN 966-528-197-6.
