= Yustynivka =

Yustynivka Юстинівка
- Village
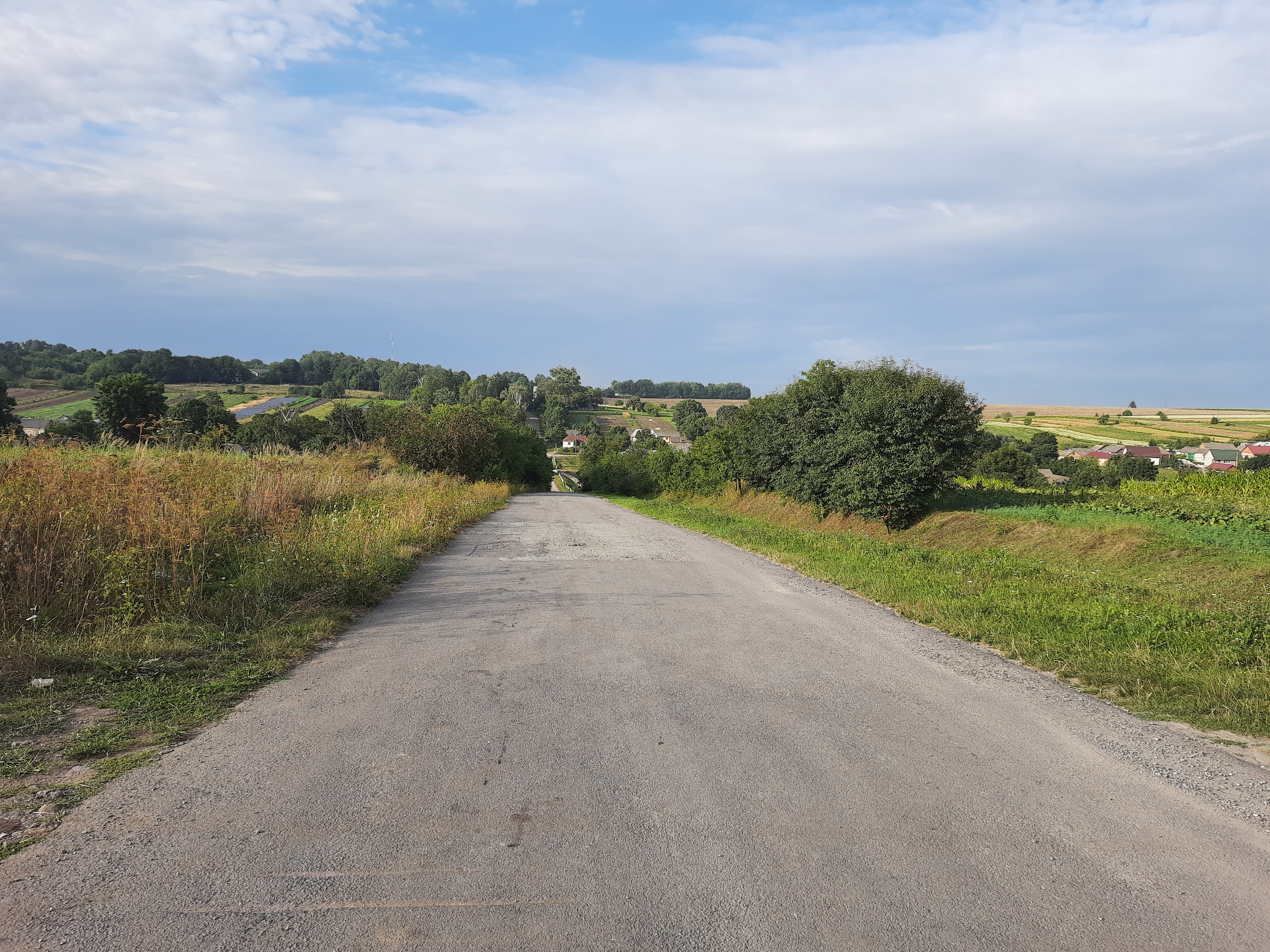
- Yustynivka village
- Interactive map of Yustynivka
- Coordinates: 49°20′26″N 25°11′30″E
- Country: Ukraine
- Oblast: Ternopil Oblast
- Raion: Ternopil Raion

Population
  - Total: 250
- Time zone: UTC+2
  - Summer (DST): UTC+3

Yustynivka (Ukrainian: Юстинівка) is a village in Ternopil Raion of Ternopil Oblast in western Ukraine. It belongs to Pidhaitsi urban hromada, one of the hromadas of Ukraine. The population is 250.

== History ==
The village was founded in the late 18th Century, around 13 km north-east of Pidhaytsi. The village was an ethnic German colony, and had the name Beckersdorf. In 1945, the German inhabitants were forced to leave the territory.

Hans Moretti, the illusionist and escapologist, was born (as Johannes Crewe) in Yustynivka in 1928, when it was still known as Beckersdorf.
