= Bokiv =

Rural locality in Ternopil Oblast, Ukraine

Bokiv Боків
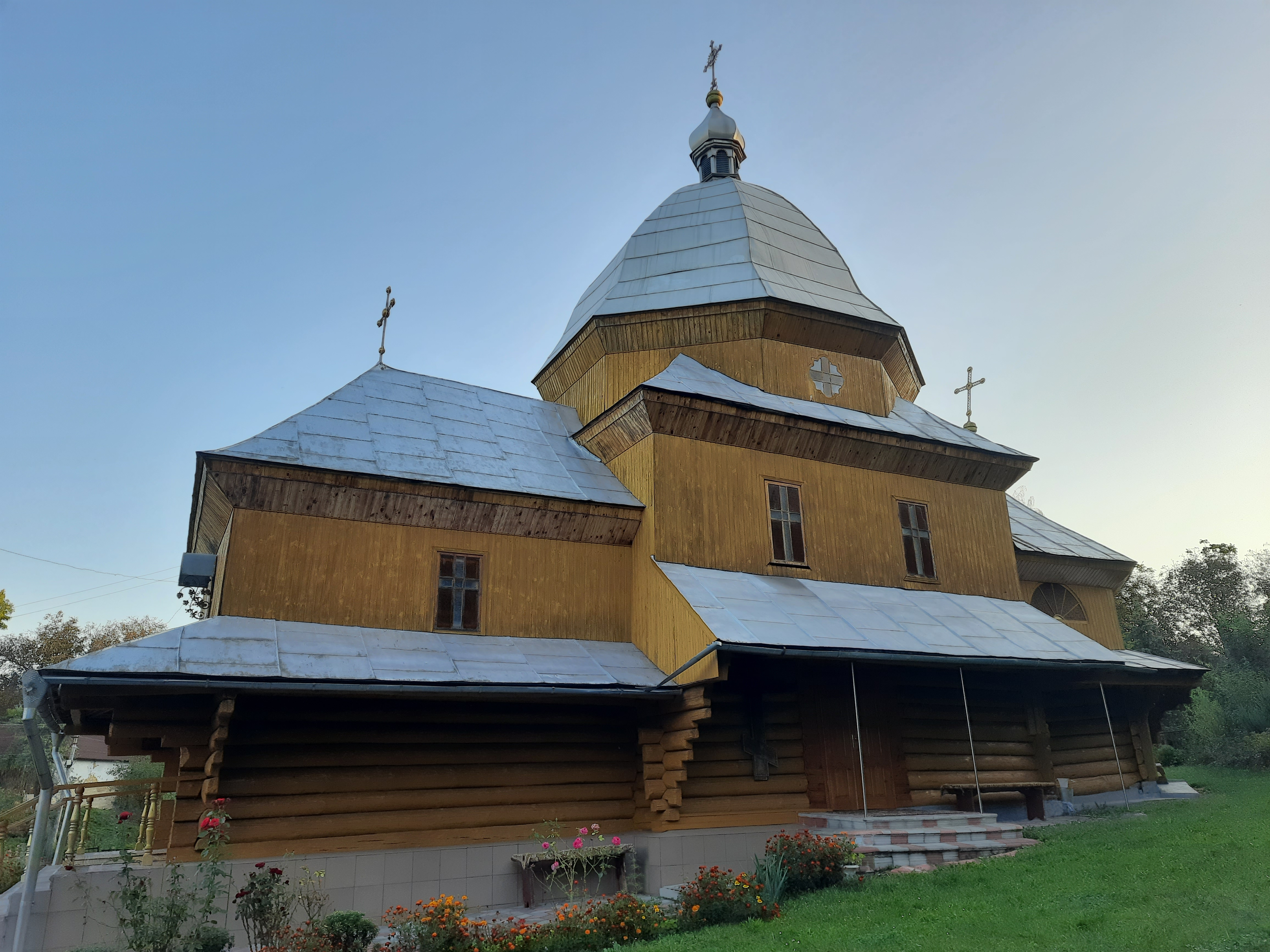
- Saint Nicholas Church in Bokiv

- Location in Ternopil Oblast
- Coordinates: 49°15′25″N 24°54′18″E
- Country: Ukraine
- Oblast: Ternopil Oblast
- Raion: Ternopil Raion
- Hromada: Pidhaitsi urban hromada
- Time zone: UTC+2 (EET)
  - Summer (DST): UTC+3 (EEST)
- Postal code: 48032

Bokiv (Ukrainian: Боків) is a village in Pidhaitsi urban hromada, Ternopil Raion, Ternopil Oblast, Ukraine.

== History ==
The first written mention of the village was in 1440.

After the liquidation of the Pidhaitsi Raion on 19 July 2020, the village became part of the Ternopil Raion.

== Religion ==
- Saint Nicholas church (1708, wooden),
- Roman Catholic church (early 19th century).

== Sources ==
- (in Ukrainian) Ониськів М., Уніят В., Боків // Ternopil Encyclopedic Dictionary: in 4 v. / editorial board: H. Yavorskyi and other, Ternopil: "Zbruch", 2004, V. 1: А—Й, S. 163. — ISBN 966-528-197-6.
- "Boków, pow. podhajecki". Geographical Dictionary of the Kingdom of Poland (in Polish). 1. Warszawa: Kasa im. Józefa Mianowskiego. 1880. p. 296.
