= Stepove, Saky Raion, Crimea =

Stepove Степове Qambar
- Village
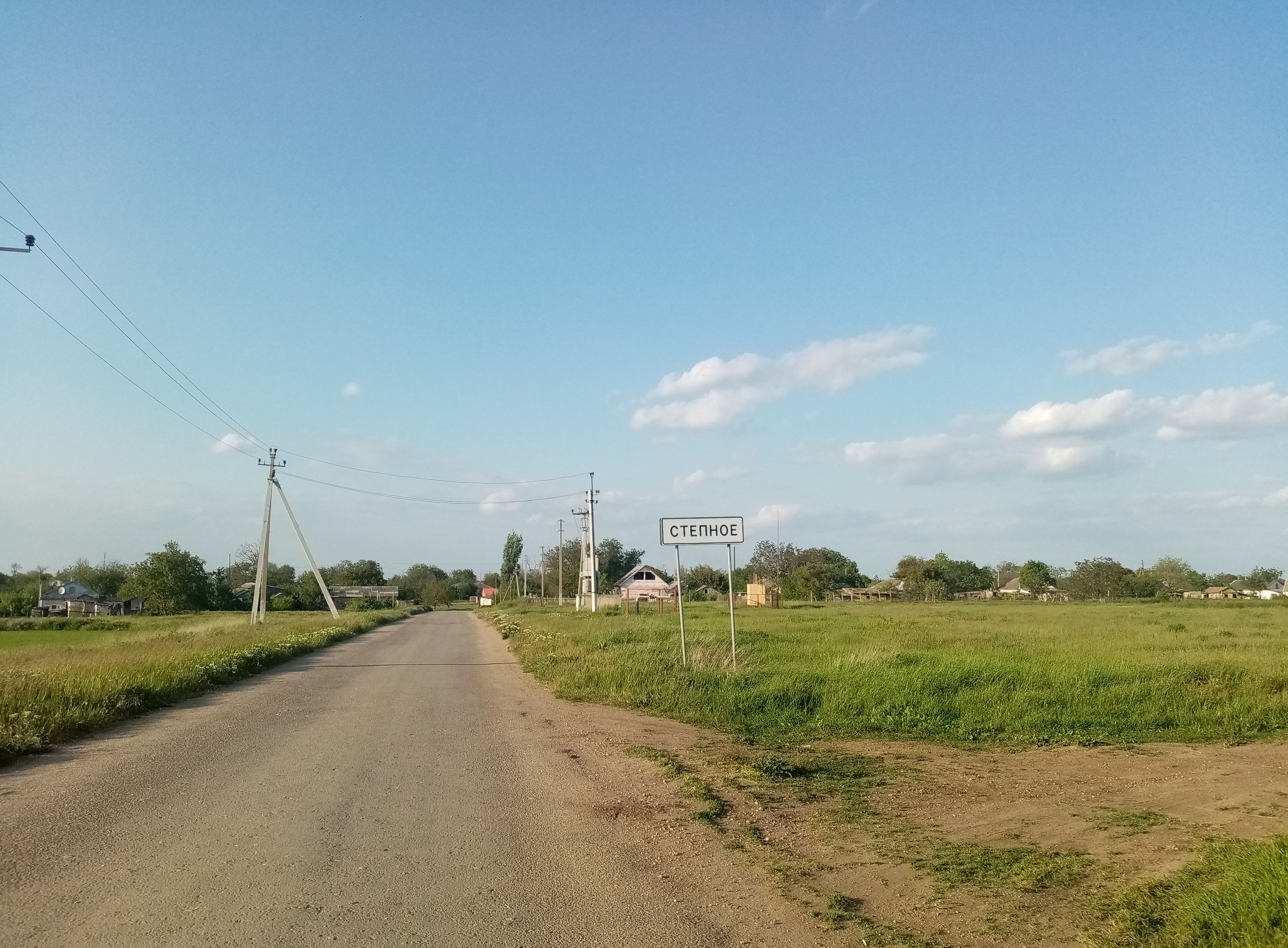

- Location of Stepove in the Autonomous Republic of Crimea
- Coordinates: 45°09′00″N 33°53′48″E
- Country: Disputed: Ukraine (de jure); Russia (de facto)
- Oblast: (Autonomous Republic of Crimea) Crimea^{1}
- Raion: Saky Raion
- Elevation: 101 m (331 ft)
- ^{1} Autonomous Republic of Crimea (de jure) or Republic of Crimea (de facto), depending on jurisdiction.

Stepove (Ukrainian: Степове, romanized: Stepove; Crimean Tatar: Qambar) is a village in the Saky Raion of the Autonomous Republic of Crimea in southern Ukraine. It is about 27 km NW of Simferopol, and 24 km east of Saky. Following the 2014 annexation of Crimea, Stepove came under the control of Russia. Population: 361 (2014 Census).
