= Pidhaitsi urban hromada =

Urban hromada in Ternopil Oblast, Ukraine

Pidhaitsi urban hromada Підгаєцька міська громада
- hromada
- Location within Ternopil Oblast Location within Ukraine
- Coordinates: 49°16′30″N 25°8′3″E
- Country: Ukraine
- Oblast: Ternopil Oblast
- Raion: Ternopil Raion
- Administrative center: Pidhaitsi

Government
  - Hromada head: Ihor Merena

Area
  - Total: 477.9 km^{2} (184.5 sq mi)

Population (2022)
  - Total: 16,236
- City: 1
- Villages: 35
- Website: pidgayci-miskrada.gov.ua

Pidhaitsi urban territorial hromada (Ukrainian: Підгаєцька територіальна громада, romanized: Pidhaietska miska terytorialna hromada) is a hromada in Ukraine, in Ternopil Raion of Ternopil Oblast. The administrative center is the city of Pidhaitsi. Its population is 16,236 (2022 estimate)

== Settlements ==
The hromada consists of 1 city (Pidhaitsi) and 35 villages:

- Bilokrynytsia
- Bokiv
- Bronhalivka
- Vaha
- Verbiv
- Volytsia
- Halych
- Hnylche
- Holhocha
- Holendra
- Zavaliv
- Zahaitsi
- Zastavche
- Zaturyn
- Lysa
- Lytvyniv
- Myrne
- Mykhailivka
- Mozolivka
- Muzhyliv
- Novosilka
- Nosiv
- Panovychi
- Poplavy
- Rudnyky
- Serednie
- Siltse
- Soniachne
- Stare Misto
- Staryi Lytvyniv
- Stepove
- Uhryniv
- Cherven
- Yustynivka
- Yablunivka
