= Pidhaitsi Raion =

Former subdivision of Ternopil Oblast, Ukraine

Coordinates: 49°27′N 24°56′E

Pidhaitsi Raion Підгаєцький район
- Raion
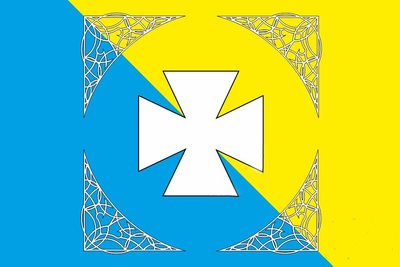
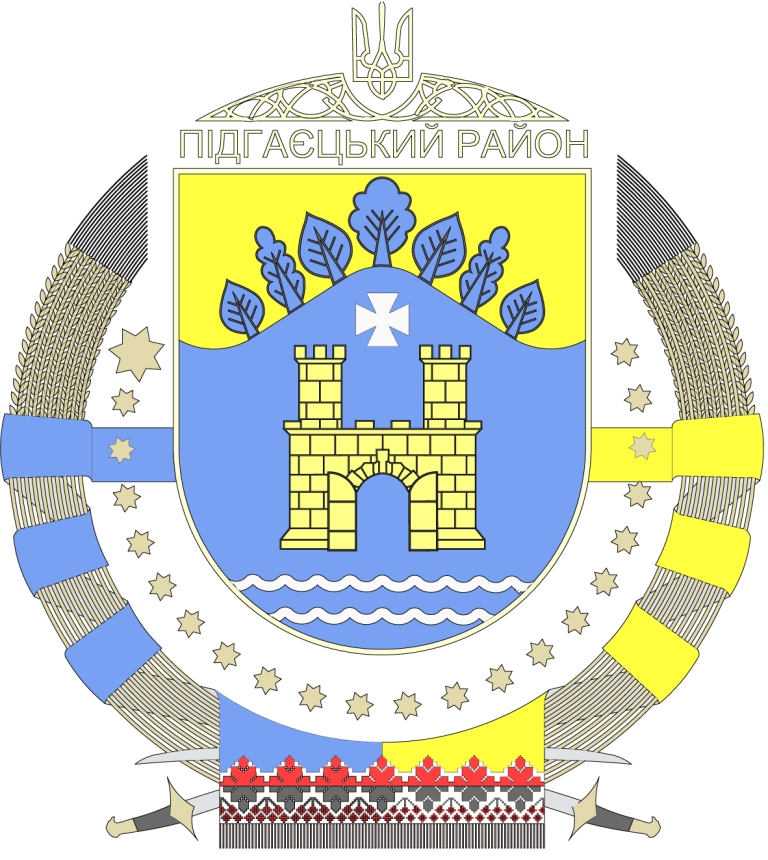
- Flag Coat of arms

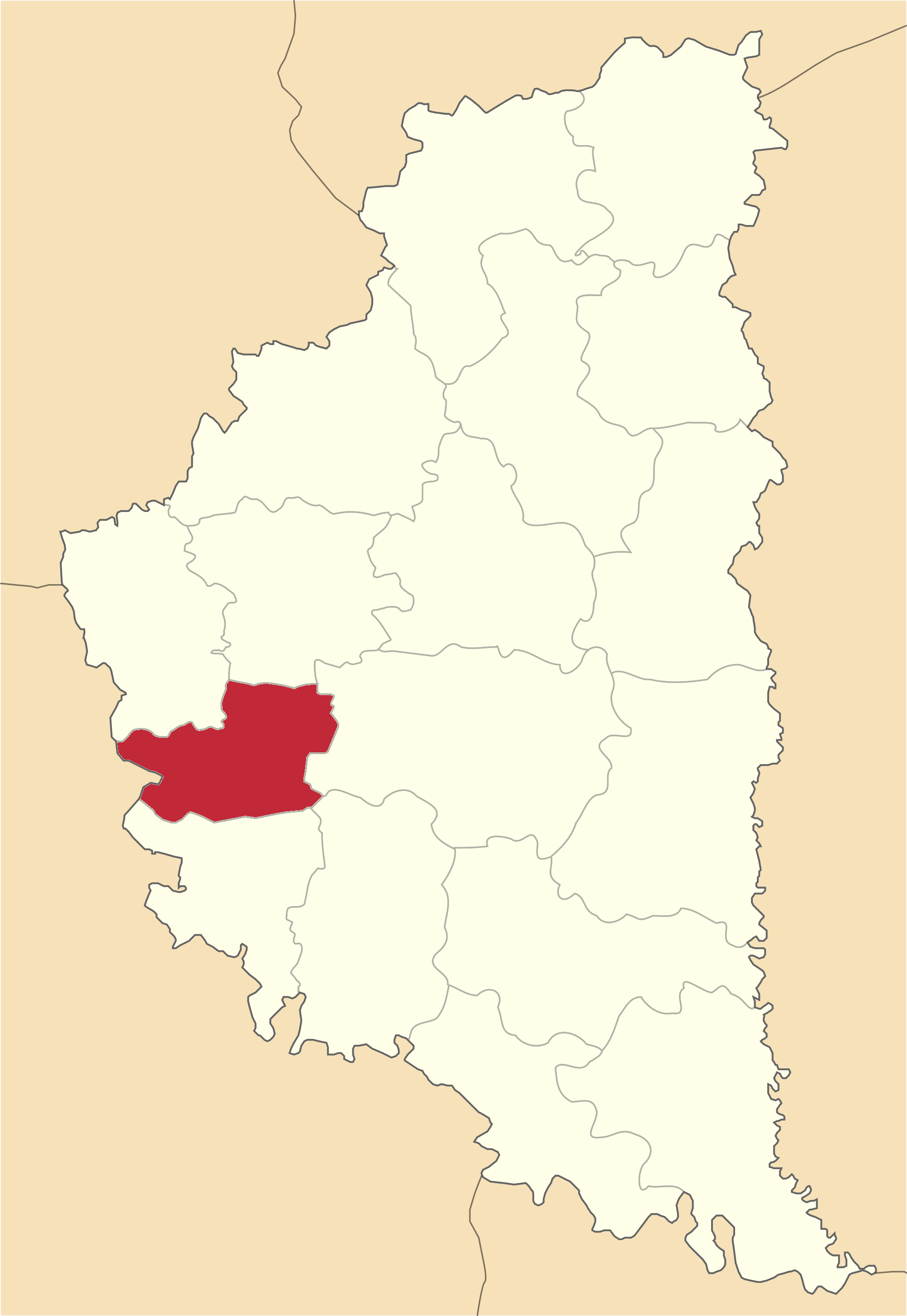
- Country: Ukraine
- Oblast: Ternopil Oblast
- Established: 1991
- Disestablished: 18 July 2020
- Admin. center: Pidhaitsi
- Subdivisions: List: — city councils; — settlement councils; — rural councils; Number of localities: — cities; — urban-type settlements; 36 — villages; — rural settlements

Area
  - Total: 496 km^{2} (192 sq mi)

Population (2020)
  - Total: 17,534
  - Density: 35.4/km^{2} (91.6/sq mi)
- Time zone: UTC+02:00 (EET)
  - Summer (DST): UTC+03:00 (EEST)
- Area code: 380-3542

Pidhaitsi Raion (Ukrainian: Підгаєцький район) was a raion (district) in the western part of Ternopil Oblast, western Ukraine. It was part of the historic area known as Halychyna (Galicia). The administrative center was the city of Pidhaitsi. The Koropets River flowed through the district. This raion was formed as a separate district on December 6, 1991 by a decree of the Ukrainian parliament. Before that it was part of neighbouring Berezhany Raion. The raion was abolished on 18 July 2020 as part of the administrative reform of Ukraine, which reduced the number of raions of Ternopil Oblast to three. The area of Pidhaitsi Raion was merged into Ternopil Raion. The last estimate of the raion population was 17,534 (2020 est.).

== Subdivisions ==
At the time of disestablishment, the raion consisted of one hromada, Pidhaitsi urban hromada with the administration in Pidhaitsi.

== Population ==
The population of the district was 22,913 inhabitants. Of these 3,203 are concentrated in Pidhaitsi, the rest in the villages cited below.

== Territory ==
The area of Pidhaitsi Raion was 496 km^{2} (192 sq mi).

== Villages ==
Names are presented in modern Ukrainian transliteration. Polish spellings (often used in documents prior to 1939 when the area was part of the Austro-Hungarian empire and Poland) are given in parentheses:

- Bilokrynytsia (Białokrynica)
- Bokiv (Boków)
- Bronhalivka (Brongalówka)
- Сherven
- Vaha (Waga)
- Verbiv (Wierzbów)
- Volytsia (Wolica)
- Halych (Halicz) - should not be mistaken with the city of Halych, in Ivano-Frankivsk Oblast
- Hnylche (Hnylcze)
- Holhocha (Hołhocze)
- Holendra (Holendry)
- Zavaliv (Zawałów) - used to be a town and is one of the more interesting larger villages in the district.
- Zahaitsi (Zahajce)
- Zastavche (Zastawcze)
- Zaturyn (Zaturyn)
- Lysa (Łysa)
- Lytvyniv (Litwinów)
- Myrne - former name: Telache (Telacze)
- Mykhailivka (Michałówka)
- Mozolivka (Mozołówka)
- Myzhyliv (Mużyłów)
- Novosilka (Nowosiółka)
- Nosiv (Nosów)
- Panovychi (Panowice)
- Poplavy (Popławy)
- Rudnyky (Rudniki)
- Serednye (Seredne)
- Siltse (Siołko)
- Soniachne (Soniachne)
- Stare Misto (Stare Miasto)
- Staryi Lytvyniv (Stary Litwinów)
- Stepove (Stepowe)
- Uhryniv (Uhrynów)
- Shumliany (Szumliany)
- Yustynivka (Justynówka)
- Yablunivka (Jabłonówka)
