= Battle of Podhajce (1698) =

Battle during the Great Turkish War

Coordinates: 49.27°N 25.14°E

- Part of the Great Turkish War and the Polish–Ottoman War
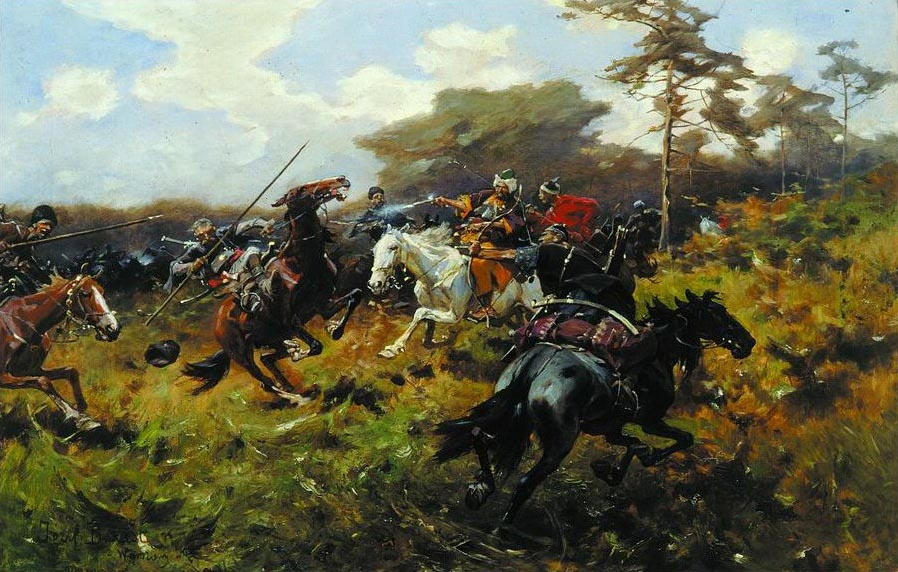
- Battle against Tatars by Józef Brandt
Date	September 8–9, 1698
Location	Podhajce, Ruthenian Voivodship (today Pidhaitsi, Ukraine)
Result	Polish–Lithuanian victory

Belligerents
Polish–Lithuanian Commonwealth	Ottoman Empire; Crimean Khanate; Budjak Horde

Commanders and leaders
Feliks Kazimierz Potocki; Nikodem Żaboklicki; Krzysztof Skarbek	Qaplan Giray; Ğazı III Giray

Strength
6,000 (Polish sources): 5,000 cavalry; 1,000 infantry; 16 light cannons	11,000–14,000 (Polish sources): Crimean Tatars; 3,000 Budjak Tatars; several hundred Sekbans

Casualties and losses
Uncertain c. 100–650; 960 (Parthenay)	Uncertain c. 200–3,000; 6,000 (Jonsac)

The Battle of Podhajce took place on 8–9 September 1698 near Podhajce in Ruthenian Voivodship during the Great Turkish War. In response to the impending military campaign of the Polish, the Ottoman Empire made a pre-emptive strike on the area of Commonwealth. Near Podhajce, the Polish army under Field Crown Hetman Feliks Kazimierz Potocki repelled the Crimean Tatar expedition under Qaplan I Giray.

== Background ==
The Ottoman Empire was defeated during the Azov campaigns (1695–1696) and in the Battle of Zenta in 1697. The empire, exhausted by the war and recent Janissaries riots and in fear of losing other territories, began to be willing to enter into peace negotiations. Habsburg Monarchy wanted to relocate forces and focus on the succession of Habsburg Spain during the impending death of Charles II of Spain. Habsburg Monarchy in the fall of 1697 began negotiations with the Ottoman Empire proposing the end of war with each member of the Holy League keeping captured territories (Uti possidetis, ita possideatis). This proposition was unfavorable for Commonwealth that would not regain part of Ukraine with Kamianets-Podilskyi that was lost after the Treaty of Buchach of 1672.

Recently elected in 1697, Commonwealth king Augustus II the Strong decided to launch a military campaign using Commonwealth and Electorate of Saxony armies against Ottomans with purpose to occupy Wallachia and Moldavia.

At the same time, Commonwealth senators headed by Stanisław Jan Jabłonowski proposed to recapture Kamianets. They did not want the king to strengthen his position through this expedition. They also argued that Kamianets was a more realistic target and already fortress garrison has problems because of partial Commonwealth supply blockade to the fortress leading to Ottomans demoralisation and desertions.

=== Commonwealth campaign preparations ===
Campaign preparations started on January 1698. In June, Polish troops started concentration at Monasterzysk. In September, at least 20,000 Saxons (~9,300 cavalry) arrived at Lviv, and 5,000 Lithuanians started heading to Lviv. Commonwealth gathered 24,000 troops (12,500 cavalry).

On August 10–13, Augustus met with Peter the Great returning from Grand Embassy to Russia. During talks held in Rava-Ruska, Peter did not promise Augustus to support his campaign despite the king's request. On August 20, a meeting of the Senate was held, and on August 21, a council of war was held. Aware of the insufficient number of troops and supplies to capture initial targets, Wallachia and Moldavia, the Poles proposed to start a siege of Kamianets, while the Saxon commanders proposed a limited campaign in Moldavia to capture a few locations.

=== Ottoman Empire preparations ===
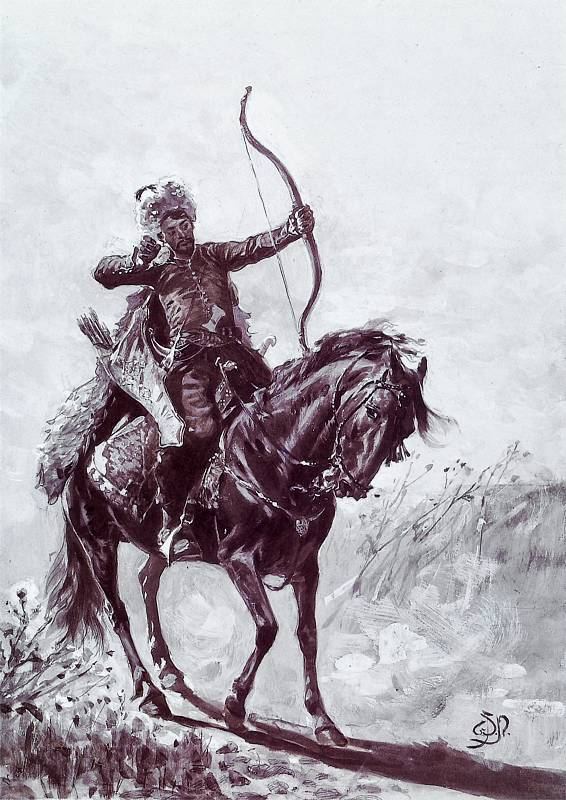
Tatar horse archer

In January 1698, Stambul's intelligence started to receive information about the king's preparations that were suspected to capture Kamianets. In May, the Antioh Cantemir was ordered to supply the fortress with 100,000 Thalers and 2,000 Janissaries. From June, Kamianets' garrison started raiding in order to gather information and kidnap slaves. These raids reached Okopy, Sniatyn and Pokuttia, enslaving multiple people and stealing 1,500 cows.

In July, Ottoman army arrived from Budjak to Cecora. According to older sources, its numbers were between 30,000 and 50,000. According to recent research, it was estimated to be between 12,000 and 15,000. The army consisted of 3,000 Tatars from Budjak Horde, several hundred Sekbans and the rest were Crimean Tatars. Additionally 2,000 Janissaries set off with army to strengthen the Kamianets fortress crew. The army was commanded by Qaplan Giray together with his deputy Ğazı III Giray. Three thousand Tatars from Budjak orda were commanded by Ğazı Giray. In the middle of August, the army, with wagons containing supplies, set out for Kamianets, where it arrived on August 23.

From Kamianets, the Ottoman army passed through Czarny Ostrów and concentrated at Oleksiniec around September 1. The Tatars sent out many raids to obtain information. Thousands of people were killed by Tatars. These raids found a smaller army group near Monasterzysk, and on September 3 reached the second, bigger army group with the Saxons near Lviv. Qaplan Giray decided to attack group near Monasterzysk. After beheading 400 peasants, they moved along Strypa River towards Osowce where on September 7 they crossed the river and set up camp near Bobulińce.

Potocki decided to concentrate Polish army in Podhajce because the terrain gave the defenders an advantage together with a castle. On September 7, hearing news about an approaching Tatar army, sent message to Żaboklicki with order to set out to Podhajce. After hearing news about the Tatar army nearby at Bobulińce, Żaboklicki gathered all units from Monasterzysk (with 12 light cannons) and on the early morning of September 8 set off to Podhajce with a separate front and rear guard ready to repel Tatars' attacks.

== Battle ==
=== September 8 ===
A map of the first day of battle

Qaplan Giray received news about the army that marched from Monasterzysk. The march route of this army in forest and swampy areas gave the Polish advantage. According to this information, he decided to divide his army into two groups. The first one, numbering c. 8,000 people, was to attack Podhajce, while the second one, numbering c. 4,000 people, was to tie up and delay Żaboklicki arrival to Podhajce.

==== Attack next to castle ====
In the afternoon, the first group led by Qaplan Giray approached Podhajce from the southeast. The Tatars immediately attacked next to the castle in order to cross levee. Defenders were not surprised, castle cannons started firing at the Tatars. Because of the Tatars' numerical superiority, defenders were forced back from levee. Due to accurate artillery fire, the Tatars were unable to successfully cross the river and defeat defenders. Charge of the cavalry reserve led by Michał Potocki forced the enemy to retreat.

==== Attack on Old City ====
After witnessing retreat, Qaplan Giray decided to cross between two ponds near Zahajce and after crossing Koropiec River they attacked the Old City. Infantry defending this position opened musket fire. Again, outnumbered defenders started losing ground, but after Polish cavalry counterattack, Tatars were repelled.

==== Attack on Zahajce ====
Next, Qaplan Giray ordered attack on Zahajce. Defenders' situation here was more complicated not only because of defenders being outnumbered but also because Tatars could attack from 3 directions. On the northern direction, Tatars managed to breach defense and captured 100 peasants. The Tatars were repelled there by three freshly arrived cavalry Chorągiews from Monasterzysk.

==== Attack on marching group from Monasterzysk ====
When the first Tatars group attacked Podhajce, the second group attacked rear guard of marching army from Monasterzysk. Despite difficult fights, the Poles – with help of cannons, wagon fort and good terrain for defense – managed to repel Tatars. Near Wierzbów, previously long Polish group (stretched up to c. 9 kilometers) created one big wagon fort and defended by it managed to reach Podhajce.

After unsuccessful attacks, Qaplan Giray decided to concentrate army at Nowosiłka and spent the night there. The second army group spent night in forests near Wierzbów.

=== September 9 ===
A map of the second day of battle

During the night war council, Potocki decided to give battle to the Tatars outside the city, 2 kilometers towards the north. West direction was protected by forests and east direction showed day before that Tatars were unable to use full advantage of numerical superiority and would not likely use it again. The decision to fight in the field had three important reasons: an insufficient number of infantry for defensive combat, the majority of the army consisted of cavalry, and the fear of devastation of the city, which was owned by Potocki.

Army was divided into three sections:

- Front section commanded by Jan Sobieski consisted mostly of c. 1,470 armoured companions, c. 170 infantry and cannons (commanded by Marcin Kątski), with purpose to tie up enemy.
- Center section commanded by Potocki consisted of c. 1,700 Polish hussars and was made to counterattack after front groups halts Tatars. Left wing was commanded by Skarbek while right by Żaboklicki. This section was 500 steps behind front section to allow cavalry to gain momentum to charge.
- Back section commanded by Potocki's son Michał Potocki was reserve and consisted of c. 1,270 armoured companions who were fighting day before.

Behind the back section, next to the city, a camp was set up, surrounded by wagons. The rest of infantry was to defend the city.

At 11 a.m. the Polish army was already deployed and prepared for battle. During early morning of September 9, main Tatars group moved to Monaster (2 km east of Litwinów). There, Qaplan sent scouting raids and reestablished contact with Ğazı's group located near Wierzbów. Around 11 a.m., army was ordered to attack Podhajce. Right wing (c. 2,000 people) was commanded by Ğazı while left wing (c. 5,000 people) was commanded by Qaplan.

==== Battle north of the city ====
At noon, Gazi's wing reached Polish advance guard and pushed it back. Around 12:30, Qaplan's wing, located on elevated position, started charge on Polish troops. It was shelled by cannons and musket fire, as a result of which it was disorganized. To take advantage of this situation, Jan Sobieski ordered cavalry attack using spears on Tatars. However, this attack was not fully effective because of charging uphill and being outnumbered by Tatars (630 vs 5,000). After 30 minutes of fight, Poles were forced to retreat closer to own artillery. Tatars attacked again and again, but cannons and musket fire stopped their attack. The Tatars retreated to within the distance of a bow shot and both sides fired at each other. Gazi's wing was also under cannon fire from the beginning and seeing results of left-wing fight, decided not to attack Poles.

==== Surprise Tatars attack on camp ====
In the meantime, c. 4,000 group of Tatars that day before attacked Żaboklicki marching group, set out from Wierzbów and went through the forests reaching Polish army from the west. This attack was complete surprise, and Tatars defeated Polish left wing of back section. This caused panic in the ranks of the army giving Tatars a chance to completely defeat Potocki's army. The Tatars reached the camp and instead of continuing attack started to plunder the camp and slaughter people there. This gave Polish troops time to reorganize and execute counterattack. Potocki ordered to attack camp by right wing of back section. Also troops from broken left wing of back section joined the fight. After the fierce fight, resulting in heavy losses, the Tatars were driven out.

== Aftermath ==
=== Tatars withdrawal ===
The Tatars did not carry out any further attacks, withdrew and burned Mużyłów, then crossed Koropiec next to Kozova. Potocki suspected the Tatars trick and Polish troops for the next 2 days were on combat alert and did not pursue enemy. Tatars, on the way back, sent multiple raiding groups plundering and catching slaves. In the second half of September, Tatars reached Kamianets.

=== Nobility conflict with king resulting in end of the campaign ===
Polish and Saxon troops located near Lviv noticed increased Tatar activity and on 6 September set out at a slow pace in the direction of Podhajce through Brzeżany. In Brzeżany, king received information about Tatar's withdrawal. Commonwealth army was insufficiently equipped with supplies (and demoralised because of it) and did not have enough artillery to siege Kamianets. Also, the conflict between the nobility and the Sapieha family in Lithuania resulted in call to gather of Pospolite ruszenie there. Therefore, king proposed ending the campaign. Senate Council made king assign 10,000 troops to block Kamianets for the duration of peace negotiations. Resolution of the Senate Council ended the campaign.

Conflict between king and Polish nobilities intensified. King showed a disrespectful attitude towards Polish laws and customs. Poles did not like the demoralised Saxons army that committed robbery and rapes. On 25 September Michał Potocki and drunken soldiers from his chorągiew went to the king's tent in Brzeżany and insulted the people present there. The king was not there at that moment, and when he found out about it, he moved to the Saxon camp. He prepared the Saxon troops in battle formation and moved 1,000 steps to the Polish camp in order to temper the Poles. Polish army hetmans tried to calm down the agitated Polish army. The hetmans did not believe that king will strike the Polish army, but as a precaution, instead of entering into a general battle, it was decided to use Hit-and-run tactics. However, mediation between commanders allowed the situation to be calmed down peacefully and on 28 September a settlement has been reached. After that situation the promised units to block Kamianets were not assigned.

=== Treaty of Karlowitz ===
5 months after the battle Treaty of Karlowitz was signed. Although unsuccessful, the Commonwealth campaign had political impact on Polish demands, contributing to obtaining Podolia with undestroyed Kamianets. Commonwealth returned John III Sobieski gains in Moldova. The last Tatars raid occurred one month later resulting in second Battle of Martynów (1699). From then on, the Commonwealth and the Ottomans were friendly neighbours.
