= Józef Potocki (disambiguation) =

Józef Potocki was a Polish magnate.

Józef Potocki may also refer to:

- Józef Potocki (starost of Leżajsk)
- Józef Felicjan Potocki, starost of Bełz
