= Lopushne rural hromada =

Rural hromada in Ternopil Oblast, Ukraine

Lopushne rural hromada Лопушненська сільська громада
- hromada
- Location within Ternopil Oblast Location within Ukraine
- Coordinates: 49°55′1″N 25°28′6″E
- Country: Ukraine
- Oblast: Ternopil Oblast
- Raion: Kremenets Raion
- Administrative center: Lopushne

Government
  - Hromada head: Oleksandr Stetsiuk

Area
  - Total: 144.0 km^{2} (55.6 sq mi)

Population (2022)
  - Total: 5,110
- Villages: 11
- Website: lopushnenska-gromada.gov.ua

Lopushne rural territorial hromada (Ukrainian: Лопушненська територіальна громада, romanized: Lopushnenska silska terytorialna hromada) is a hromada in Ukraine, in Kremenets Raion of Ternopil Oblast. The administrative center is the village of Lopushne. Its population is 5,110 (2022 estimate) Established on 10 August 2015.

== Settlements ==
The hromada consists of 11 villages:

- Bashuky
- Velyka Horianka
- Volytsia
- Ivannia
- Krutniv
- Lopushne
- Mala Horianka
- Novyi Oleksynets
- Raslavka
- Roztoky
- Staryi Oleksynets
