= Novyi Oleksynets =

Rural locality in Ternopil Oblast, Ukraine

Novyi Oleksynets Новий Олексинець
- Interactive map of Novyi Oleksynets
- Location in Ternopil Oblast Novyi Oleksynets (Ternopil Oblast)
- Coordinates: 49°50′23″N 25°29′46″E
- Country: Ukraine
- Oblast: Ternopil Oblast
- Raion: Kremenets Raion
- Hromada: Lopushne rural hromada

Population (2025)
  - Total: 503
- Time zone: UTC+2 (EET)
  - Summer (DST): UTC+3 (EEST)
- Postal code: 47065

Novyi Oleksynets (Ukrainian: Новий Олексинець) is a village in Ukraine, Ternopil Oblast, Kremenets Raion, Lopushne rural hromada. After the liquidation of the Kremenets Raion (1940–2020) on 19 July 2020, the village became part of the Kremenets Raion.

== Bibliography ==
- (in Ukrainian) Клименко О., Хаварівський Б., Новий Олексинець // Ternopil Encyclopedic Dictionary: in 4 v. / editorial board: H. Yavorskyi and other, Ternopil: "Zbruch", 2005, V. 2: К—О, S. 639. — ISBN 966-528-199-2.
- "Oleksiniec (2), Nowy, pow. krzemieniecki". Geographical Dictionary of the Kingdom of Poland (in Polish). 7. Warszawa: Kasa im. Józefa Mianowskiego. 1886. p. 459.
