= Velyka Horianka =

Rural locality in Ternopil Oblast, Ukraine

Velyka Horianka Велика Горянка
- Interactive map of Velyka Horianka
- Location in Ternopil Oblast Velyka Horianka (Ternopil Oblast)
- Coordinates: 49°52′56″N 25°30′4″E
- Country: Ukraine
- Oblast: Ternopil Oblast
- Raion: Kremenets Raion
- Hromada: Lopushne rural hromada

Population (2001)
  - Total: 454
- Time zone: UTC+2 (EET)
  - Summer (DST): UTC+3 (EEST)
- Postal code: 47054

Velyka Horianka (Ukrainian: Велика Горянка) is a village in Ukraine, Ternopil Oblast, Kremenets Raion, Lopushne rural hromada. After the liquidation of the Kremenets Raion (1940–2020) on 19 July 2020, the village became part of the Kremenets Raion.

== Bibliography ==
- (in Ukrainian) Уніят В., Велика Горянка // Ternopil Encyclopedic Dictionary: in 4 v. / editorial board: H. Yavorskyi and other, Ternopil: "Zbruch", 2004, V. 1: А—Й, S. 236. — ISBN 966-528-197-6.
- (in Ukrainian) Івахів Г., Уніят В., Велика Горянка // Ternopil Oblast. History of cities and villages: in 3 v. / Ternopil: "Terno-graph", 2014, V. 2: Г—Л, S. 527—528. — ISBN 978-966-457-228-3.
- "Horynka Wielka i Mała". Geographical Dictionary of the Kingdom of Poland (in Polish). p. 586.
