= Great Turkish War =

Conflicts between Ottomans and Holy League (1683–1699)

- Part of the Ottoman–Habsburg wars, the Russo-Ottoman wars and the Polish–Ottoman wars
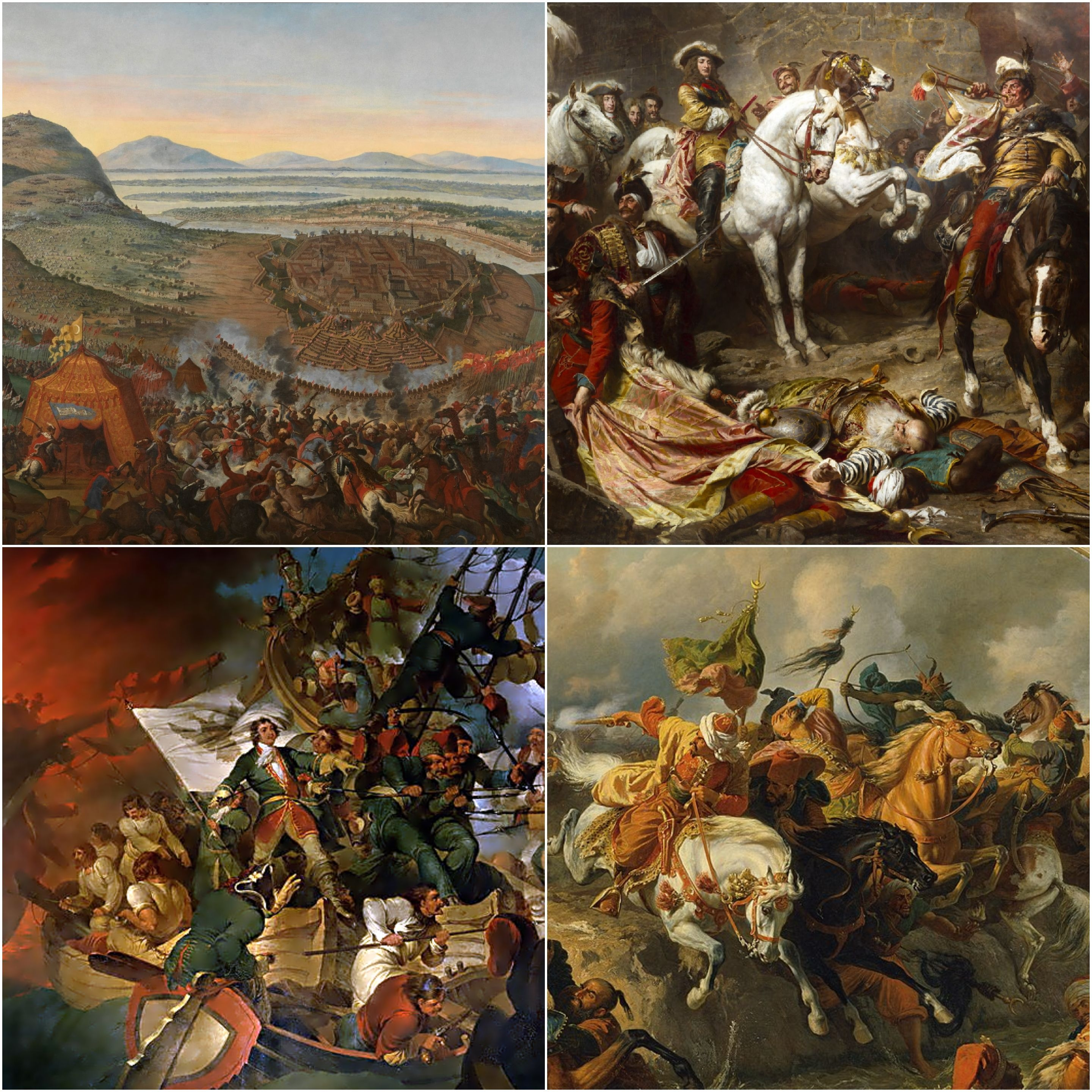
- From top left: The Battle of Vienna, the Siege of Buda, the Azov campaigns, the Battle of Zenta
Date	14 July 1683 – 26 January 1699 (15 years, 6 months, 1 week and 5 days)
Location	Central Europe; Eastern Europe; Balkans
Result	Holy League victory
Territorial changes	The Habsburg monarchy wins lands in Hungary, the Principality of Transylvania and the Balkans; Poland–Lithuania captures Podolia; Russia captures the port of Azov; Venice captures Morea and inner Dalmatia.

Belligerents
Holy League: Holy Roman Empire; Poland–Lithuania; Tsardom of Russia; Republic of Venice; Knights of Malta; Papal States	Ottoman Empire

Commanders and leaders
(Holy Roman Empire) Leopold I (Holy Roman Empire) Charles of Lorraine (Holy Roman Empire) Eugene of Savoy (Holy Roman Empire) Louis of Baden (Holy Roman Empire) Rüdiger Starhemberg (Polish–Lithuanian Commonwealth) John III Sobieski (Polish–Lithuanian Commonwealth) Kazimierz Potocki (Republic of Venice) Francesco Morosini (Republic of Venice) Wilhelm Königsmarck	(Ottoman Empire) Mehmed IV # (Ottoman Empire) Mustafa Pasha (executed) (Ottoman Empire) Süleyman Pasha (executed) (Ottoman Empire) Mehmed Pasha †

Strength
(Holy Roman Empire) 88,100 (annual average) (Polish–Lithuanian Commonwealth) 27,000–60,000 (Tsardom of Russia) 162,902 (peak, 1687) (Note: 112,902 Muscovite, 50,000 Cossacks) (Republic of Venice) 25,000 (1688)	(Ottoman Empire) 150,000

Casualties and losses
(Holy Roman Empire) 300,000 killed and wounded (Note: Approximately 120,000 were killed.) (Tsardom of Russia) 90,000 killed and wounded (Polish–Lithuanian Commonwealth) Unknown (Republic of Venice) Unknown	Unknown
- 384,000 military deaths

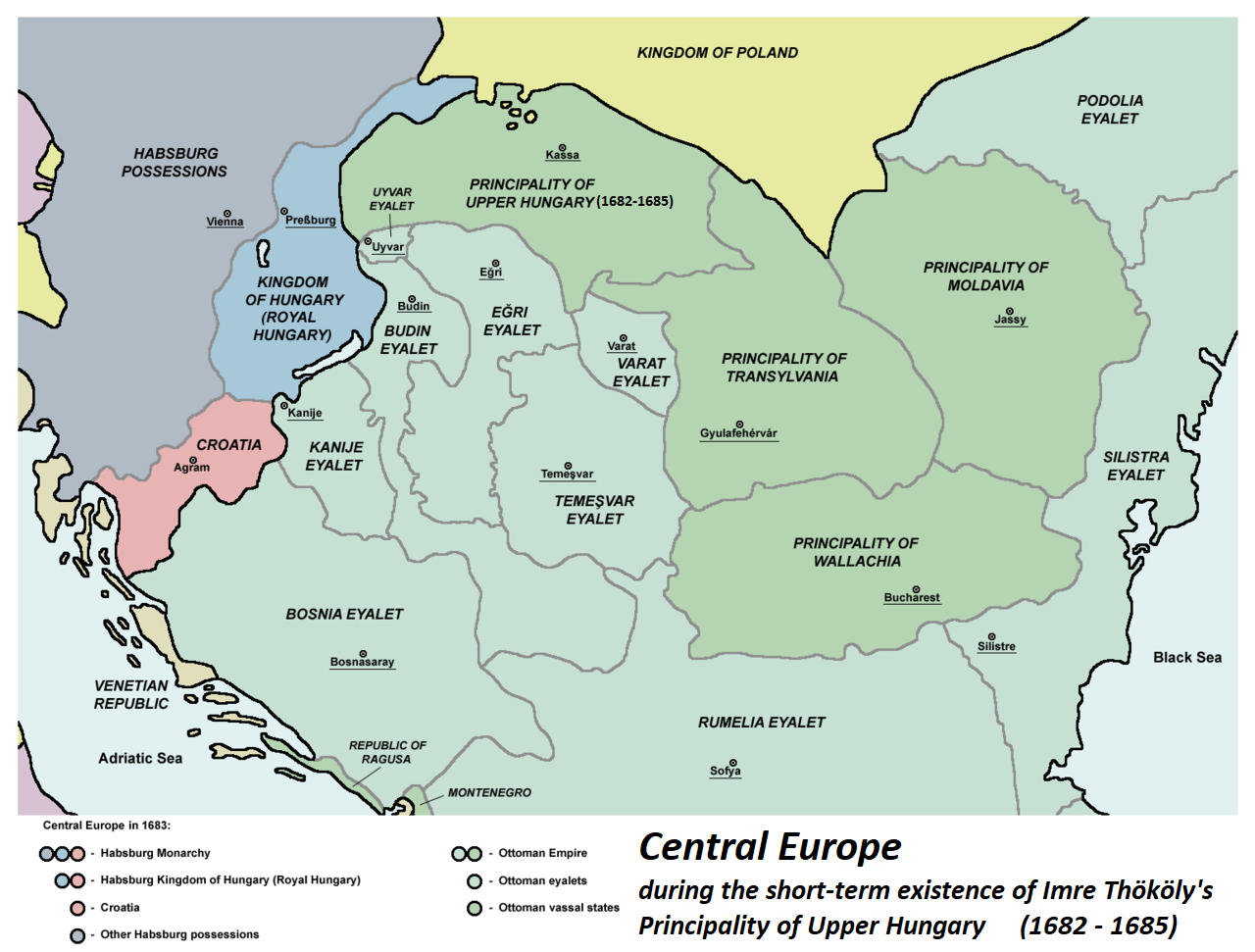
The northern Balkans in 1683, before the war. The northwestern portion is shown as belonging to the Habsburgs, the bulk of the Balkans under the Ottomans, with the far-northeastern area being Polish. Habsburg Empire Ottoman Empire

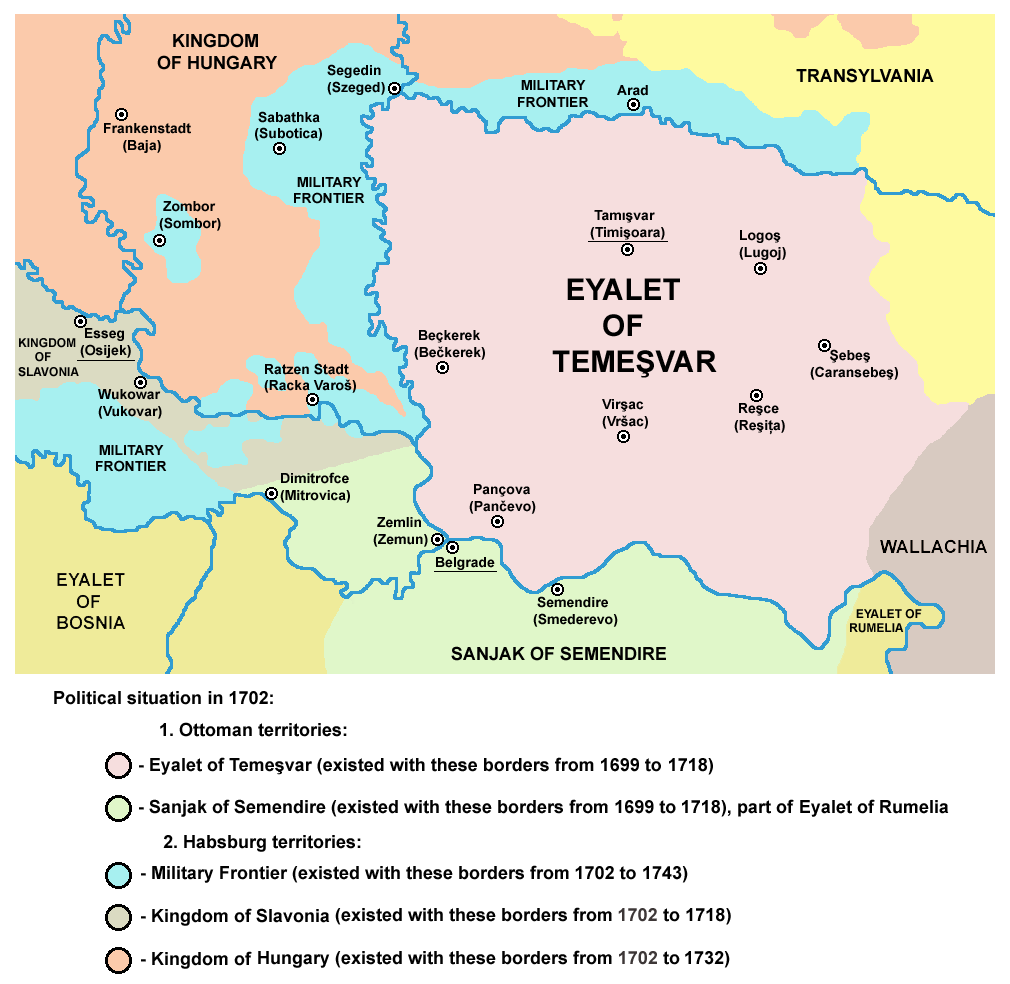
The northern Balkans, after the Treaty of Karlowitz. Habsburg Empire Ottoman Empire

The Great Turkish War was a series of conflicts between the Ottoman Empire and the Holy League consisting of the Holy Roman Empire, Poland-Lithuania, Venice, Russia, and the Kingdom of Hungary. Intensive fighting began in 1683 and ended with the signing of the Treaty of Karlowitz in 1699. The war was a resounding defeat for the Ottoman Empire, which for the first time lost substantial territory, in Hungary and the Polish–Lithuanian Commonwealth, as well as in part of the western Balkans. The war was also the first instance of Russia joining an alliance with Western Europe.

The French did not join the Holy League, as France had agreed to reviving an informal Franco-Ottoman alliance in 1673, in exchange for Louis XIV being recognized as a protector of Catholics in the Ottoman domains.

Initially, Louis XIV took advantage of the conflict to extend France's eastern borders, seizing Luxembourg in the War of the Reunions, but deciding that it was unseemly to be fighting the Holy Roman Empire at the same time of its struggle with the Ottomans, he agreed to the Truce of Ratisbon in 1684. However, as the Holy League made gains against the Ottoman Empire, capturing Belgrade by 1688, the French began to worry that their Habsburg rivals would grow too powerful and eventually turn on France. Therefore, the French besieged Philippsburg on 27 September 1688, breaking the truce and triggering the separate Nine Years' War against the Grand Alliance, which included the Dutch Republic, the Holy Roman Empire and, after the Glorious Revolution, England as well. The war drew Imperial resources to the west and relieved the Turks. This was partially compensated by the entrance of Russia into the war in 1687. While the war started off with the Ottomans facing Imperial forces in the west, the Venetians to the south, and Poland-Lithuania to the north, which stretched Ottoman military resources across multiple fronts. As a result, they positioned about 60,000 men against the Holy Roman Empire, 37,000 against the Polish-Lithuanians, 35,000 against the Venetians, and a smaller force against Russians between 1684 and 1687.

As a result, the advance made by the Holy League stalled, allowing the Ottomans to retake Belgrade in 1690. The war then fell into a stalemate, and peace was concluded in 1699, which began following the Battle of Zenta in 1697 when an Ottoman attempt to retake their lost possessions in Hungary was crushed by the Holy League.

The war largely overlapped with the Nine Years' War (1688–1697), which took up the vast majority of the Habsburgs' attention while it was active. In 1695, for instance at the height of Imperial military deployment in the west, the Holy Roman Empire states had 263,000 troops in the field, with England, the Dutch Republic, and Spain contributing another 173,000, specifically to the conflict against France. Of those 263,000, only 74,000, or about one quarter, were positioned against the Turks; ~190,000 were positioned against the French. Overall, from 1683 to 1699, the Imperial States had on average 88,100 men fighting the Turks, while from 1688 to 1697, they had on average 127,410 fighting the French. (Note: The figure of 127,410 also includes the core Habsburg army under Leopold I, which numbered about 70,000 men, of which only a small part was transferred from the Eastern to the Western front and was barely used there; therefore, the figure may be misleading.)

== Names ==
The term Great Turkish War comes from German: Großer Türkenkrieg. Names for the war include the "Last Crusade", or the "Fourteenth Crusade" launched against the Turks by the papacy. It is also called in Ottoman sources the "Disaster Years" (Turkish: Felaket Seneleri).

== Background (1667–1683) ==
Following Bohdan Khmelnytsky's rebellion, the Tsardom of Russia in 1654 acquired territories from the Polish–Lithuanian Commonwealth (currently parts of eastern Ukraine), while some Cossacks stayed in the southeastern part of the Commonwealth. Their leader, Petro Doroshenko, sought the Ottoman Empire's protection and in 1667 attacked the Polish commander John Sobieski.

In August 1672, Sultan Mehmed IV, who knew that the Polish–Lithuanian Commonwealth was weakened by internal conflicts, attacked Kamenets Podolski, a large city on the border of the Commonwealth. The small Polish force resisted the siege of Kamenets for two weeks but was then forced to surrender. The Polish army was too small to resist the Ottoman invasion and could score only some minor tactical victories. After three months, the Poles were forced to sign the Treaty of Buchach in which they agreed to cede Kamenets, Podolia and to pay tribute to the Ottomans. When the news of the defeat and treaty terms reached Warsaw, the General Sejm refused to pay the tribute and organized a large army under Sobieski; subsequently, the Poles won the Battle of Khotyn (1673). After the death of King Michael in 1673, Sobieski was elected king of Poland. He tried to defeat the Ottomans for four years, with no success. The war ended on 17 October 1676 with the Treaty of Żurawno in which the Turks retained control over only Kamenets-Podolski. This Turkish attack also led in 1676 to the beginning of the Russo-Turkish Wars.

== Overview ==
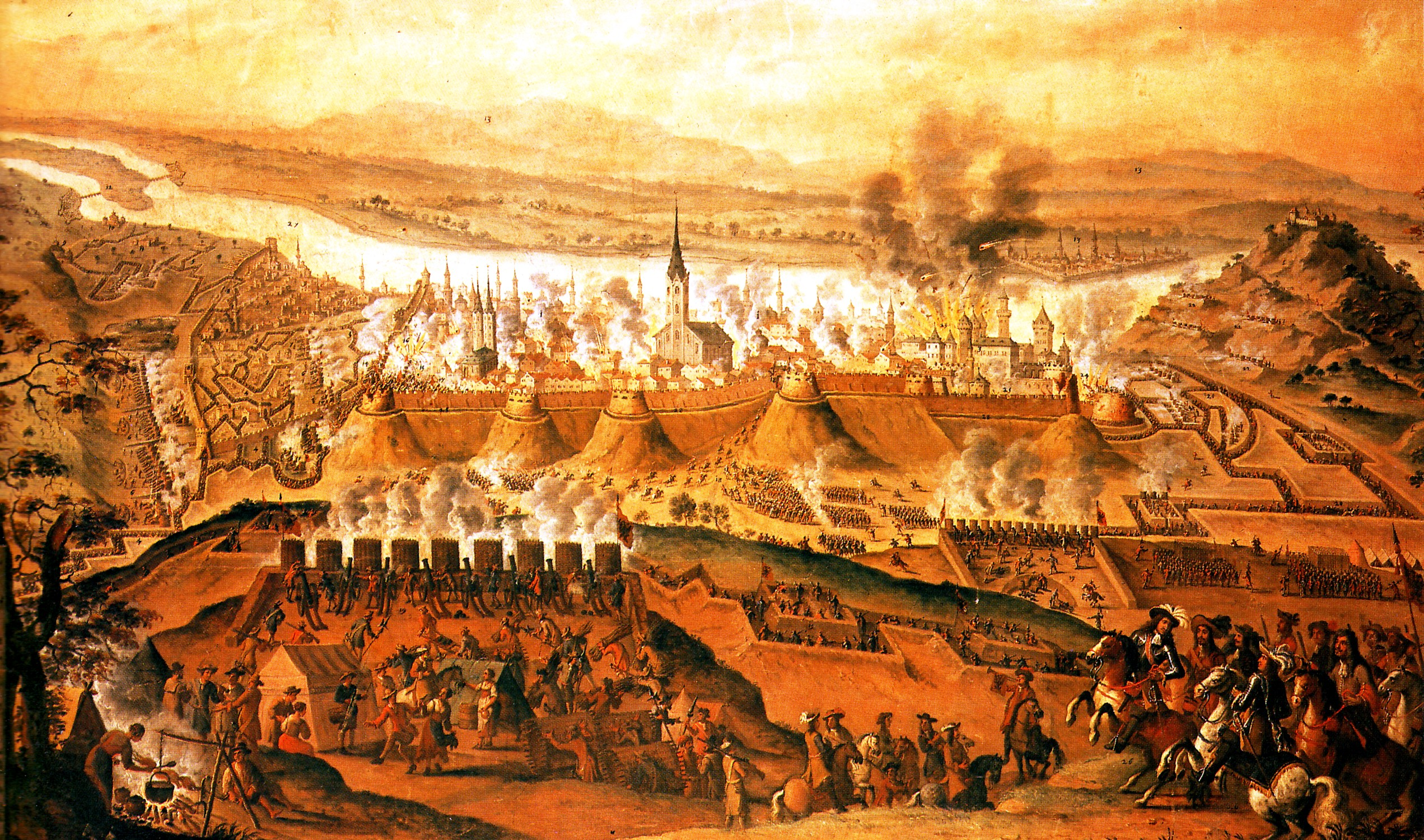
The Holy League took Buda after a long siege in 1686

After a few years of peace, the Ottoman Empire, encouraged by successes in the west of the Polish–Lithuanian Commonwealth, attacked the Habsburg monarchy. The Turks almost captured Vienna, but John III Sobieski led a Christian alliance that defeated them in the Battle of Vienna (1683), stalling the Ottoman Empire's hegemony in south-eastern Europe.

A new Holy League was initiated by Pope Innocent XI and encompassed the Holy Roman Empire (headed by the Habsburg monarchy), the Polish–Lithuanian Commonwealth and the Venetian Republic in 1684, joined by Russia in 1686. Holy League's troops besieged and in 1686 conquered Buda, which had been under Ottoman rule since 1541. The second battle of Mohács (1687) was a crushing defeat for the Sultan. The Turks were more successful on the Polish front and were able to retain Podolia during their battles with the Polish–Lithuanian Commonwealth.

Russia's involvement marked the first time the country formally joined an alliance of European powers. This was the beginning of a series of Russo-Turkish Wars, the last of which was part of World War I. As a result of the Crimean campaigns and Azov campaigns, Russia captured the key Ottoman fortress of Azov.

Following the decisive Battle of Zenta in 1697 and lesser skirmishes (such as the Battle of Podhajce in 1698), the League won the war in 1699 and forced the Ottoman Empire to sign the Treaty of Karlowitz. The Ottomans ceded most of Hungary, Transylvania and Slavonia, as well as parts of Croatia, to the Habsburg monarchy while Podolia returned to Poland. Most of Dalmatia passed to Venice, along with the Morea, which the Ottomans reconquered in 1715 and regained in the Treaty of Passarowitz of 1718.

=== Serbia ===
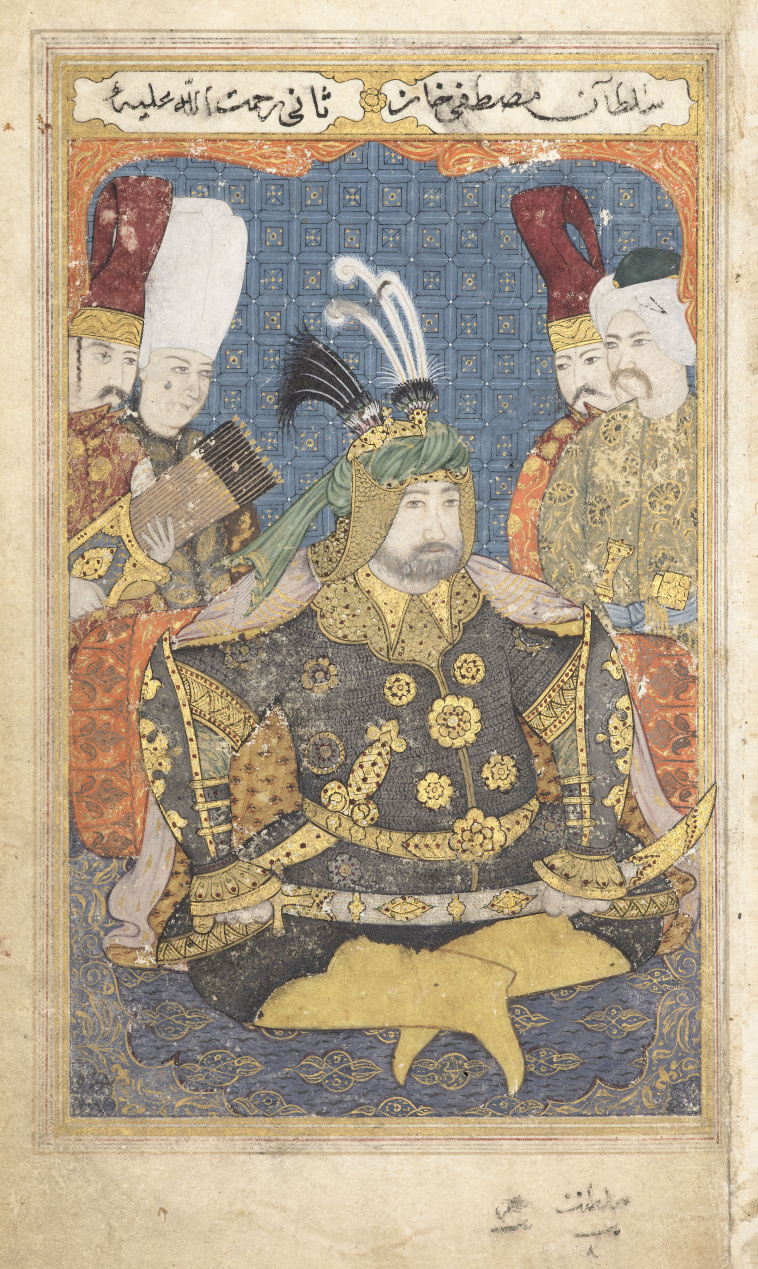
Mustafa II came to power during the war, where he personally commanded the Ottoman Army.

After allied Christian forces had captured Buda from the Ottoman Empire in 1686 during the Great Turkish War, Serbs from Pannonian Plain (present-day Hungary, Slavonia region in present-day Croatia, Bačka and Banat regions in present-day Serbia) joined the troops of the Habsburg monarchy as separate units known as Serbian Militia. Serbs, as volunteers, massively joined the Habsburg side. In the first half of 1688, the Habsburg army, together with units of Serbian Militia, captured Gyula, Lippa (today Lipova, Romania) and Borosjenő (today Ienu, Romania) from the Ottoman Empire. After the capture of Belgrade from the Ottomans in 1688, Serbs from the territories in the south of the Sava and Danube rivers began to join Serbian Militia units.

=== Kosovo ===
The Roman Catholic bishop and philosopher Pjetër Bogdani returned to the Balkans in March 1686 and spent the next years promoting resistance to the armies of the Ottoman Empire, in particular in his native Kosovo. He and his vicar Toma Raspasani played a leading role in the pro-Austrian movement in Kosovo during the Great Turkish War. He contributed a force of 6,000 Albanian soldiers to the Austrian army which had arrived in Pristina and accompanied it to capture Prizren. There, however, he and much of his army were met by another equally formidable adversary, the plague. Bogdani returned to Pristina but succumbed to the disease there on 6 December 1689. His nephew, Gjergj Bogdani, reported in 1698 that his uncle's remains were later exhumed by Turkish and Tatar soldiers and fed to the dogs in the middle of the square in Pristina.

Sources from 1690 report that the "Germans" in Kosovo have made contact with 20,000 Albanians who have turned their weapons against the Turks.

== Battle of Vienna ==
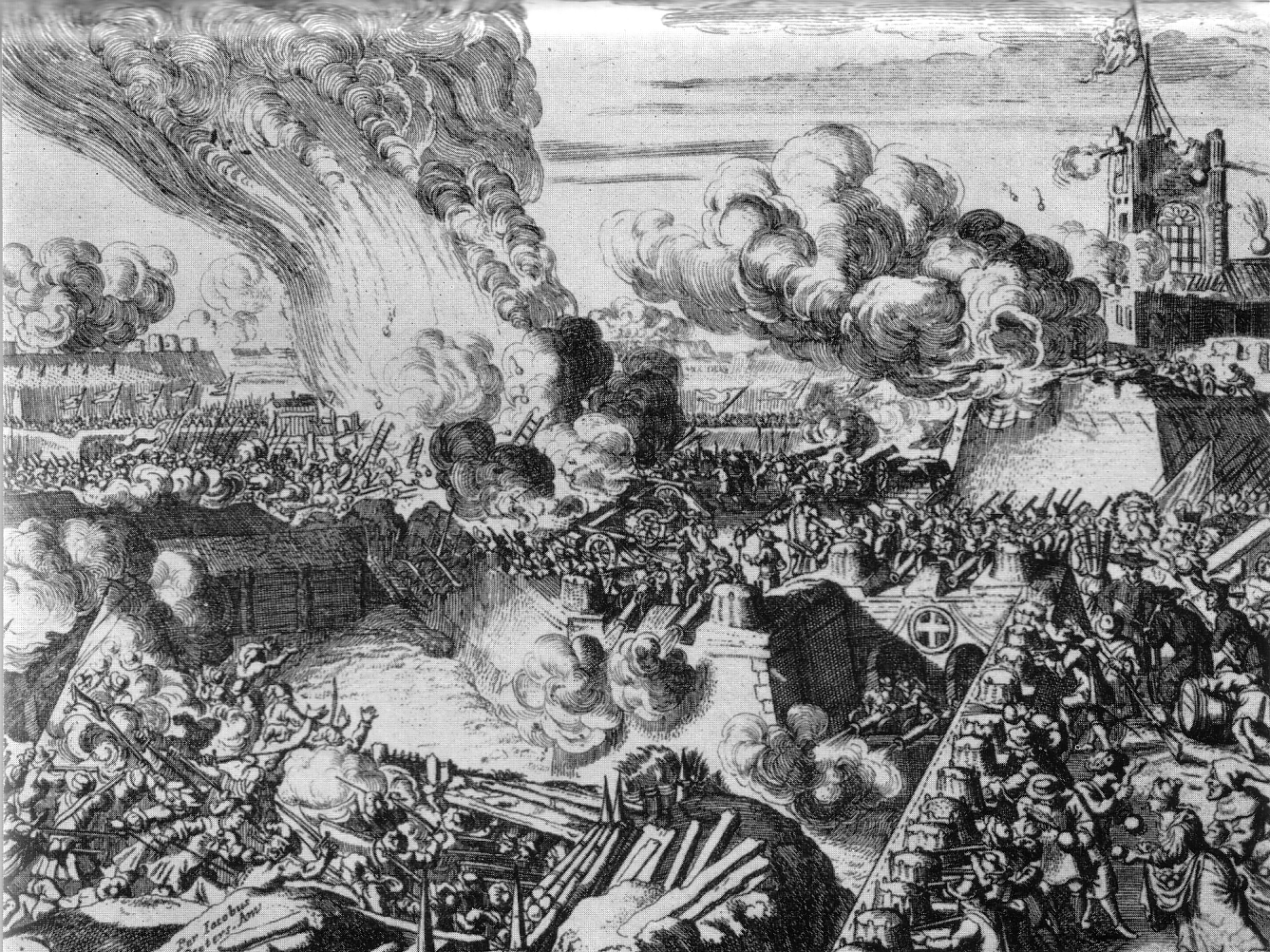
Defence of the fortifications of Vienna by civilians, oil painting by Romeyn de Hooghe

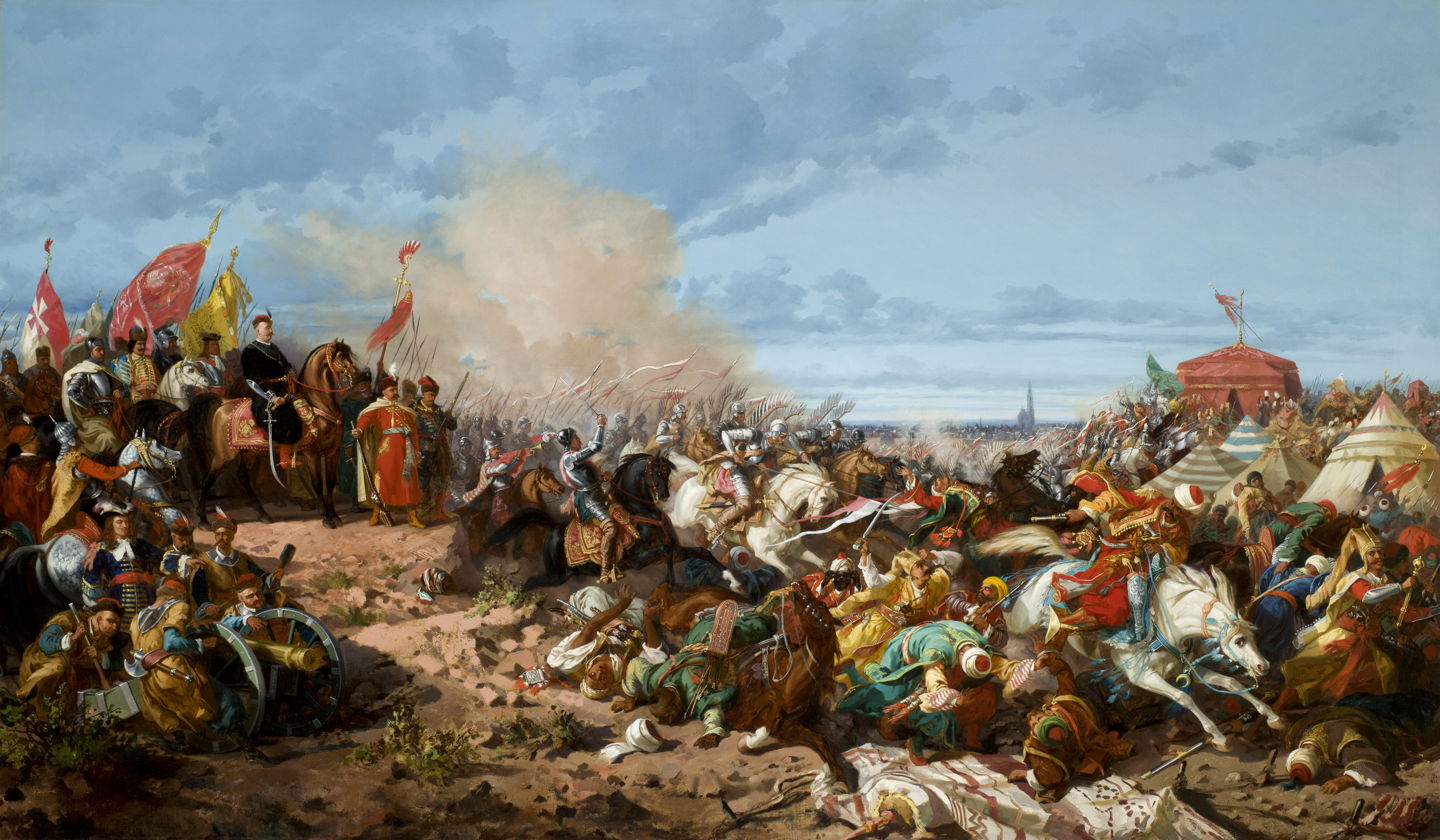
Sobieski at Vienna by Stanisław Chlebowski – king John III of Poland and Grand Duke of Lithuania

Capturing Vienna had long been a strategic aspiration of the Ottoman Empire, because of its interlocking control over Danubian (Black Sea to Western Europe) southern Europe, and the overland (Eastern Mediterranean to Germany) trade routes. During the years preceding this second siege (the first had taken place in 1529), under the auspices of Grand viziers from the influential Köprülü family, the Ottoman Empire undertook extensive logistical preparations, including the repair and establishment of roads and bridges leading into the Holy Roman Empire and its logistical centres, as well as the forwarding of ammunition, cannon and other resources from all over the Ottoman Empire to these centres and into the Balkans. Since 1679, the Great Plague had been ravaging Vienna.

The main Ottoman army finally laid siege to Vienna on 14 July 1683. On the same day, Kara Mustafa Pasha sent the traditional demand for surrender to the city. Ernst Rüdiger Graf von Starhemberg, leader of the garrison of 15,000 troops and 8,700 volunteers with 370 cannon, refused to capitulate. Only days before, he had received news of the mass slaughter at Perchtoldsdorf, a town south of Vienna, where the citizens had handed over the keys of the city after having been given a similar choice. Siege operations started on 17 July.

On 6 September, the Poles under John III Sobieski crossed the Danube 30 km north-west of Vienna at Tulln to unite with the Imperial troops and the additional forces from Saxony, Bavaria, Baden, Franconia, and Swabia. Louis XIV of France declined to help his Habsburg rival, having just annexed Alsace. An alliance between Sobieski and the Emperor Leopold I resulted in the addition of the Polish hussars to the already existing allied army. The command of the forces of European allies was entrusted to the Polish king, who had under his command 70,000–80,000 soldiers facing a Turkish army of 150,000. Sobieski's courage and remarkable aptitude for command were already known in Europe.

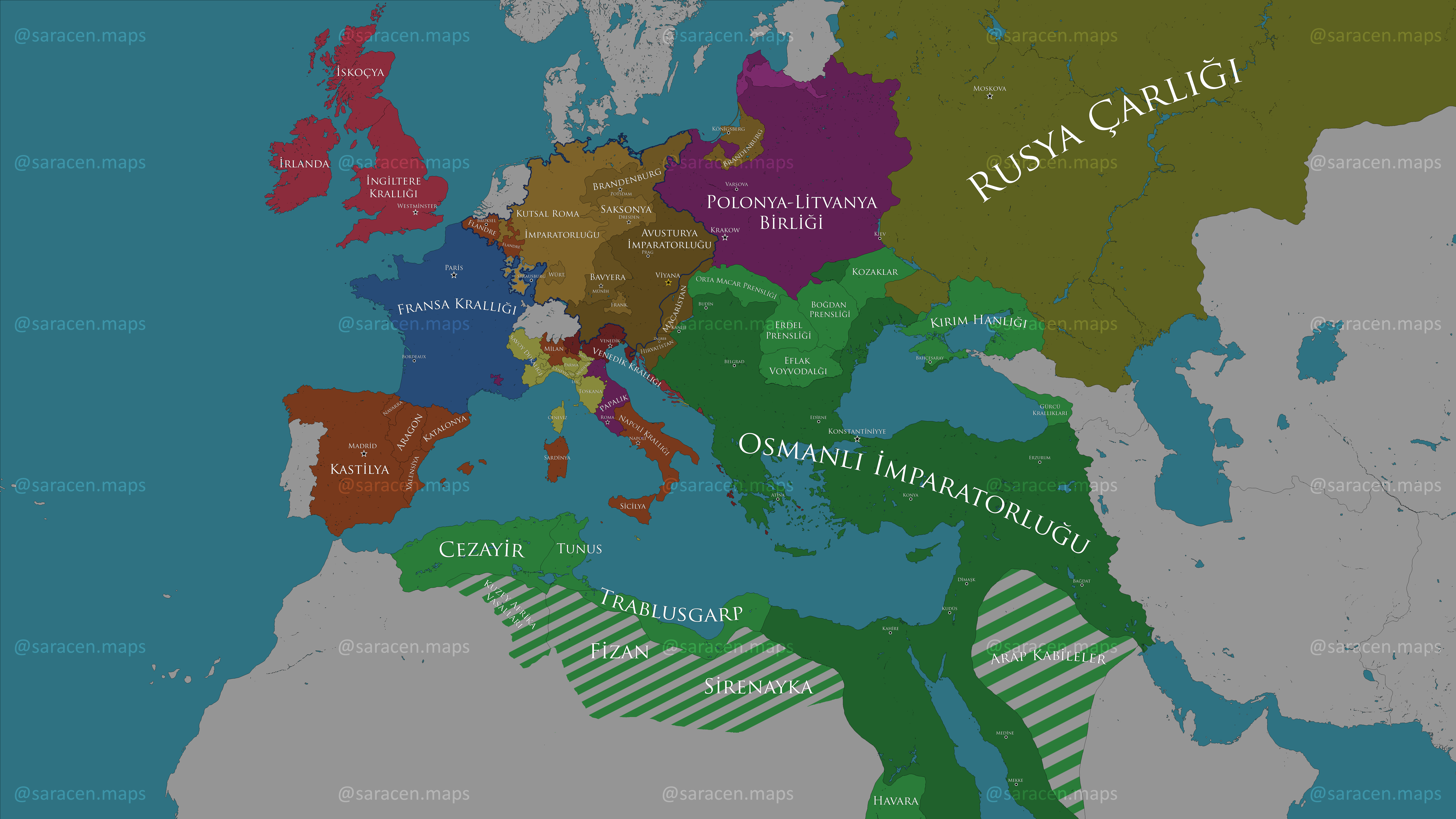
Europe after Battle of Vienna

During early September, the experienced 5,000 Ottoman sappers had repeatedly blown up large portions of the walls between the Burg bastion, the Löbel bastion and the Burg ravelin, creating gaps of about 12m in width. The Viennese tried to counter this by digging their own tunnels to intercept the depositing of large amounts of gunpowder in caverns. The Ottomans finally managed to occupy the Burg ravelin and the low wall in that area on 8 September. Anticipating a breach in the city walls, the remaining Viennese prepared to fight in the inner city.

=== Staging the battle ===
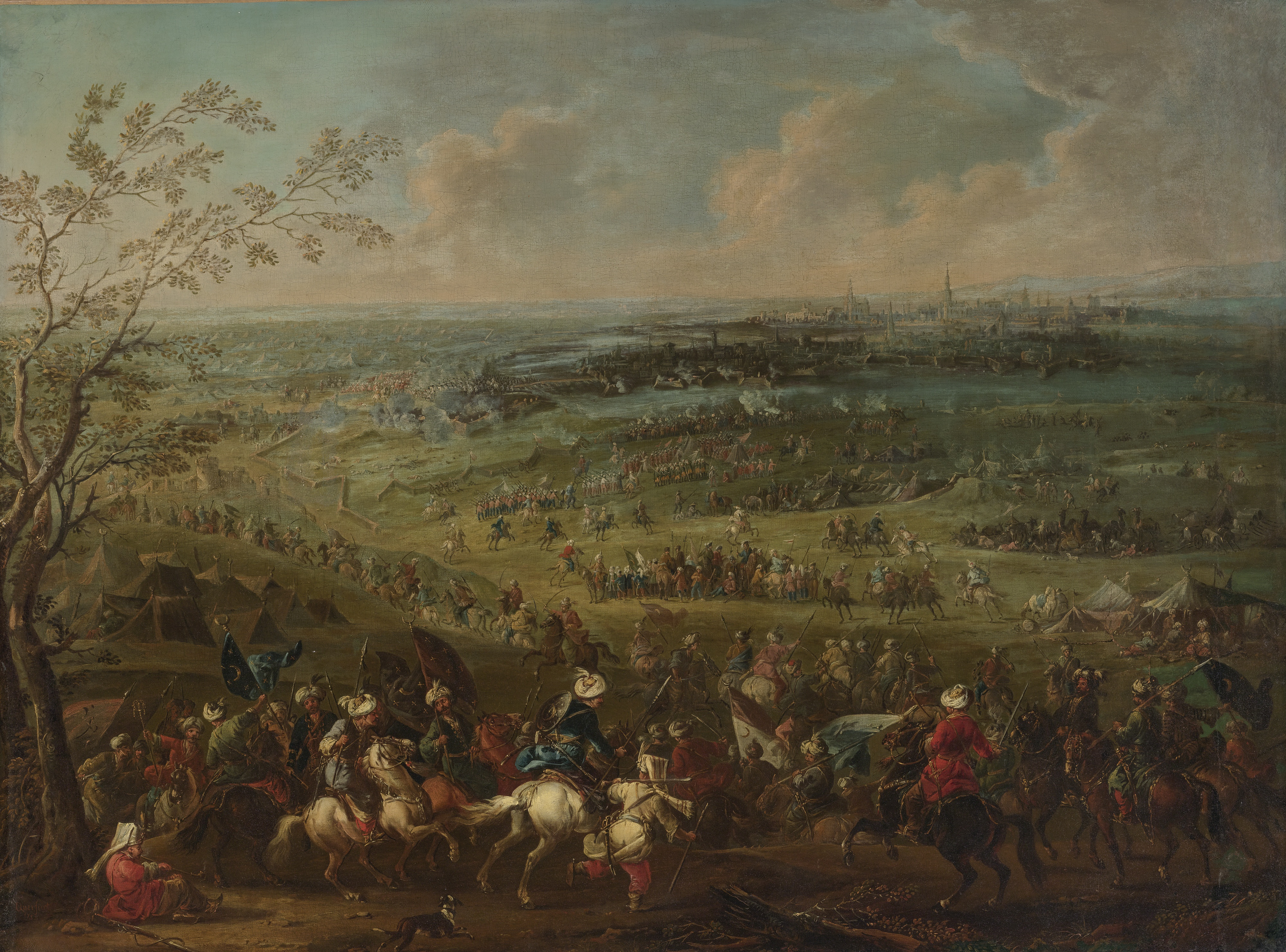
Turks before the walls of Vienna

The relief army had to act quickly to save the city and so prevent another long siege. Despite the binational composition of the army and the short space of only six days, an effective leadership structure was established, centred on the Polish king and his Hussars. The Holy League settled the issues of payment by using all available funds from the government, loans from several wealthy bankers and noblemen and large sums of money from the Pope. Also, the Habsburgs and Poles agreed that the Polish government would pay for its own troops while still in Poland, but that they would be paid by the Emperor once they had crossed into Imperial territory. However, the Emperor had to recognise Sobieski's claim to first rights of plunder of the enemy camp in the event of a victory.

Kara Mustafa Pasha was less effective at ensuring his forces' motivation and loyalty, and preparing for the expected relief-army attack. He had entrusted defence of the rear to the Khan of Crimea and his light cavalry force, which numbered about 30,000–40,000. There is doubt as to how far the Tatars participated in the final battle before Vienna. The Ottomans could not rely on their Wallachian and Moldavian allies. George Ducas, Prince of Moldavia, was captured, while Șerban Cantacuzino's forces joined the retreat after Sobieski's cavalry charge.

The confederated troops signalled their arrival on the Kahlenberg above Vienna with bonfires. Before the battle a Mass was celebrated for the King of Poland and his nobles.

=== Battle ===
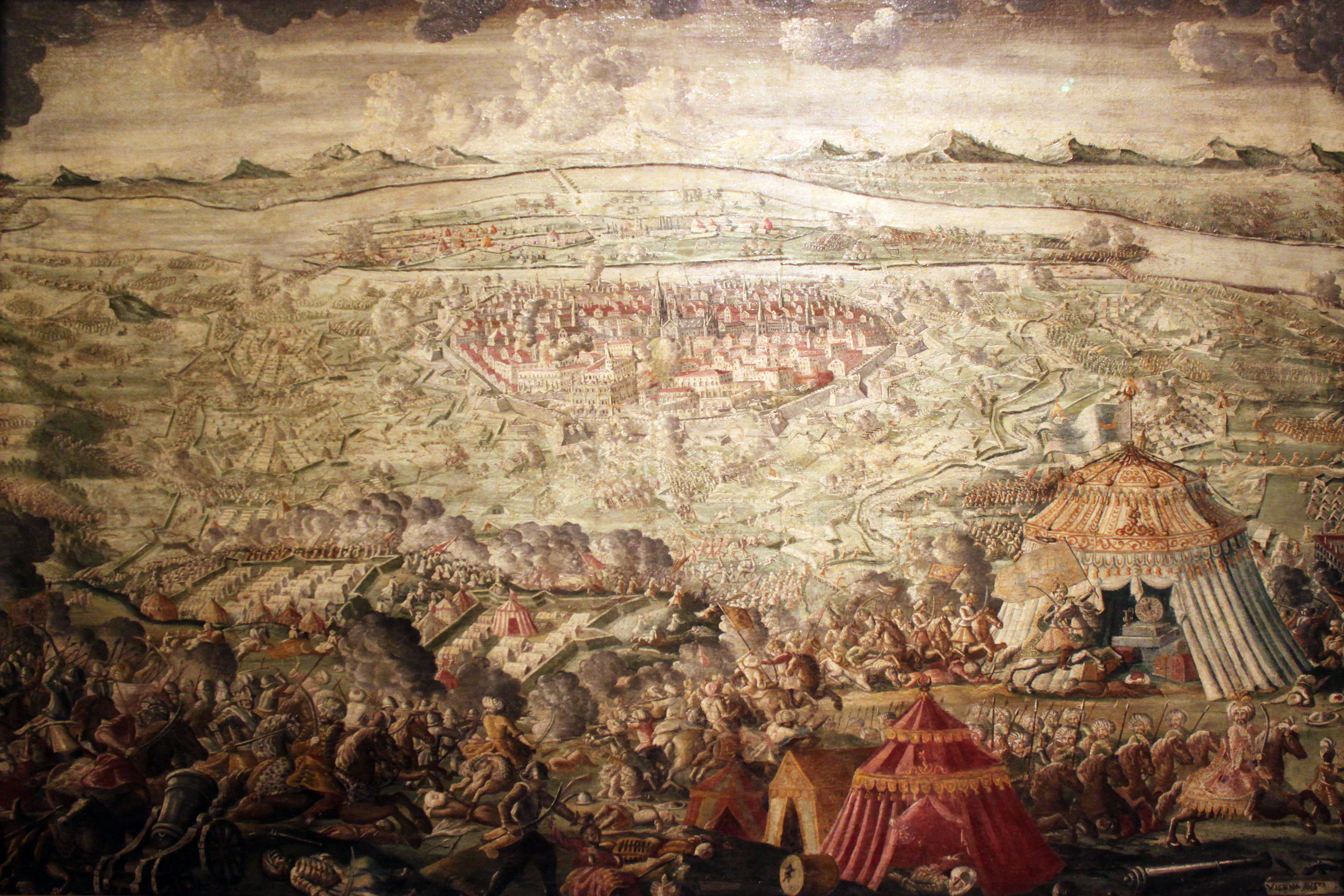
The relief of Vienna on 12 September 1683

Around 6:00 pm, the Polish king ordered the cavalry to attack in four groups, three Polish and one from the Holy Roman Empire. Eighteen thousand horsemen charged down the hills, the largest cavalry charge in history. Sobieski led the charge at the head of 3,000 Polish heavy lancers, the famed "Winged Hussars". The Lipka Tatars, who fought on the Polish side, wore a sprig of straw in their helmets to distinguish themselves from the Tatars fighting on the Ottoman side. The charge easily broke the lines of the Ottomans, who were exhausted and demoralised and soon started to flee the battlefield. The cavalry headed straight for the Ottoman camps and Kara Mustafa's headquarters, while the remaining Viennese garrison sallied out of its defences to join in the assault.

The Ottoman troops were tired and dispirited following the failure of both the attempt at sapping and the assault on the city and the advance of the Holy League infantry on the Turkenschanz. The cavalry charge was one last deadly blow. Less than three hours after the cavalry attack, the Christian forces had won the battle and saved Vienna. The first Christian officer who entered Vienna was Margrave Ludwig of Baden, at the head of his dragoons.

Afterwards, Sobieski paraphrased Julius Caesar's famous quotation Veni, vidi, vici in saying "Veni, vidi, Deus vicit" – "I came, I saw, God conquered".

== Reconquest of Hungary ==
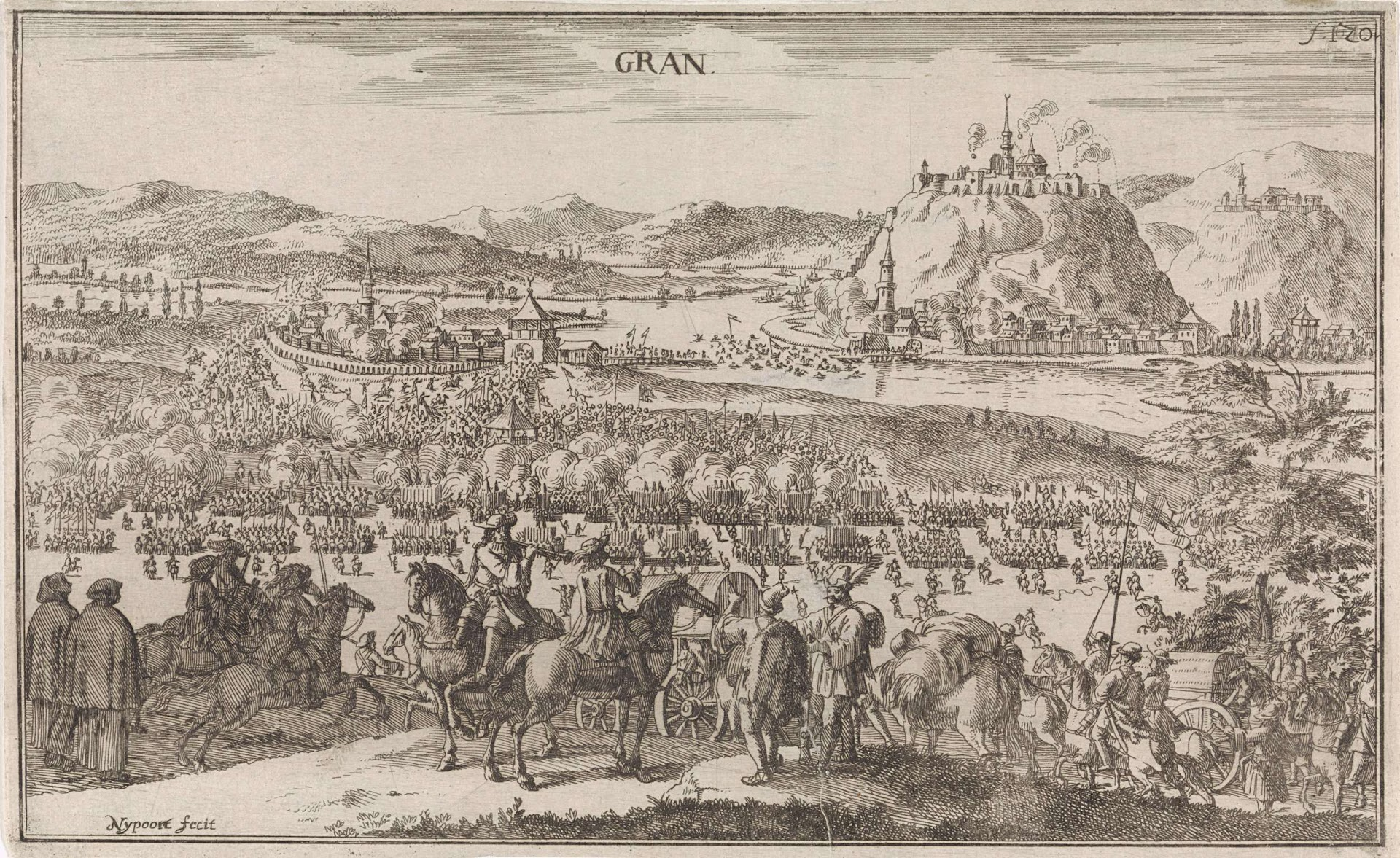
The Battle of Párkány with Esztergom in the background, 7–9 October 1683

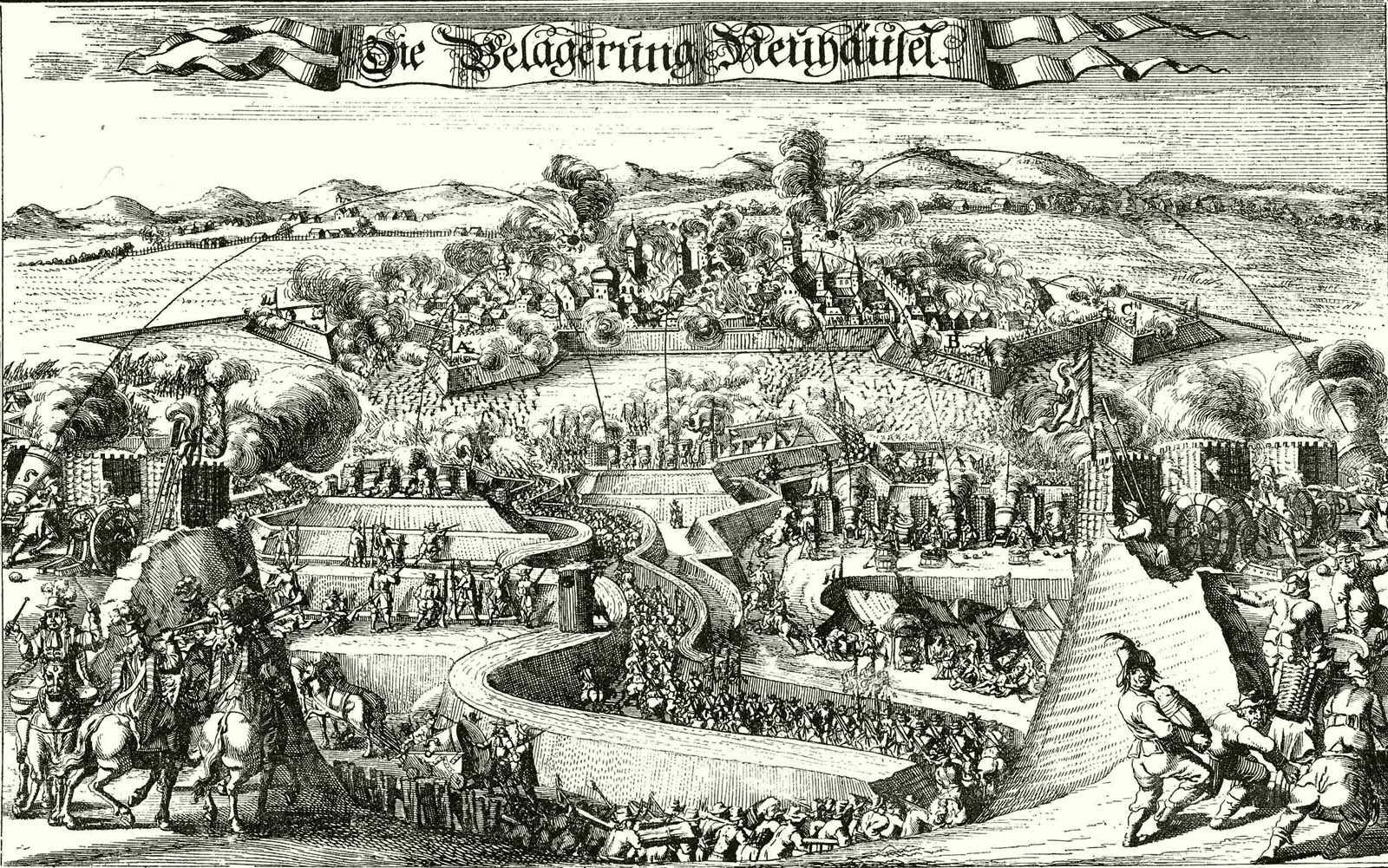
Siege of Érsekújvár in what is today Nové Zámky, Slovakia, 1685

After the Ottoman army was defeated at Vienna, the Imperial army and its allied Polish troops began a counteroffensive to conquer Ottoman Hungary. After the Victory at Párkány in October 1683, Esztergom was forced to surrender after a short siege.

Field Marshal Aeneas de Caprara defeated the Ottoman Army near the city of Kassa in 1685. After the Ottoman field army was defeated near Esztergom in 1685, the cities besieged by the Imperial forces could no longer count on relief. Érsekújvár (Nové Zámky) fell on 19 August, soon afterwards also the places Eperies, Kaschau, and Tokaj.

In 1686, two years after an unsuccessful siege of Buda, a renewed European campaign was started to enter Buda. In June 1686, the Duke of Lorraine besieged Buda (Budapest), the centre of Ottoman Hungary and the old royal capital. After resisting for 78 days, the city fell on 2 September, and Turkish resistance collapsed throughout the region as far away as Transylvania and Serbia.

In 1687, the Ottomans raised new armies and marched north once more. However, Charles V, Duke of Lorraine intercepted the Turks at the Second Battle of Mohács and avenged the loss inflicted over 160 years ago by Suleiman the Magnificent. Such was the scale of their defeat that the Ottoman army mutinied—a revolt which spread to Constantinople. The Grand Vizier, Sarı Süleyman Pasha, was executed and Sultan Mehmed IV deposed.

Only when the Ottomans suffered yet another disastrous battle at the Battle of Zenta in 1697 did they sue for peace; the resulting Treaty of Karlowitz in 1699 secured territories, the rest of Hungary and overlordship of Transylvania for the Austrians. Throughout Europe Protestants and Catholics hailed Prince Eugene of Savoy as "the savior of Christendom".

== Balkan campaign ==
The distractions of the war against Louis XIV had enabled the Turks to recapture Belgrade in 1690. In August 1691, the Austrians, under Louis of Baden, regained the advantage by heavily defeating the Turks at the Battle of Slankamen on the Danube, securing Habsburg possession of Hungary and Transylvania.

While the Ottoman army was in the process of crossing the Tisza River near Zenta, it was engaged in a surprise attack by Habsburg Imperial forces commanded by Prince Eugene of Savoy. His victory at Zenta had turned him into a European hero. After a brief raid into Ottoman Bosnia, culminating in the sack of Sarajevo, Eugene returned to Vienna in November 1697 to a triumphal reception.

== Associated wars ==
=== Morean War ===
The Republic of Venice had held several islands in the Aegean and the Ionian seas, together with strategically positioned forts along the coast of the Greek mainland since the carving up of the Byzantine Empire after the Fourth Crusade. However, with the rise of the Ottomans, during the 16th and early 17th centuries, they lost most of these, such as Cyprus and Euboea (Negropont) to the Turks. Between 1645 and 1669, the Venetians and the Ottomans fought a long and costly war over Crete, the last major Venetian possession in the Aegean. During this war, the Venetian commander, Francesco Morosini, came into contact with the rebellious Maniots, for a joint campaign in the Morea. In 1659, Morosini landed in the Morea, and together with the Maniots, he took Kalamata. However, he was soon after forced to return to Crete, and the Peloponnesian venture failed.

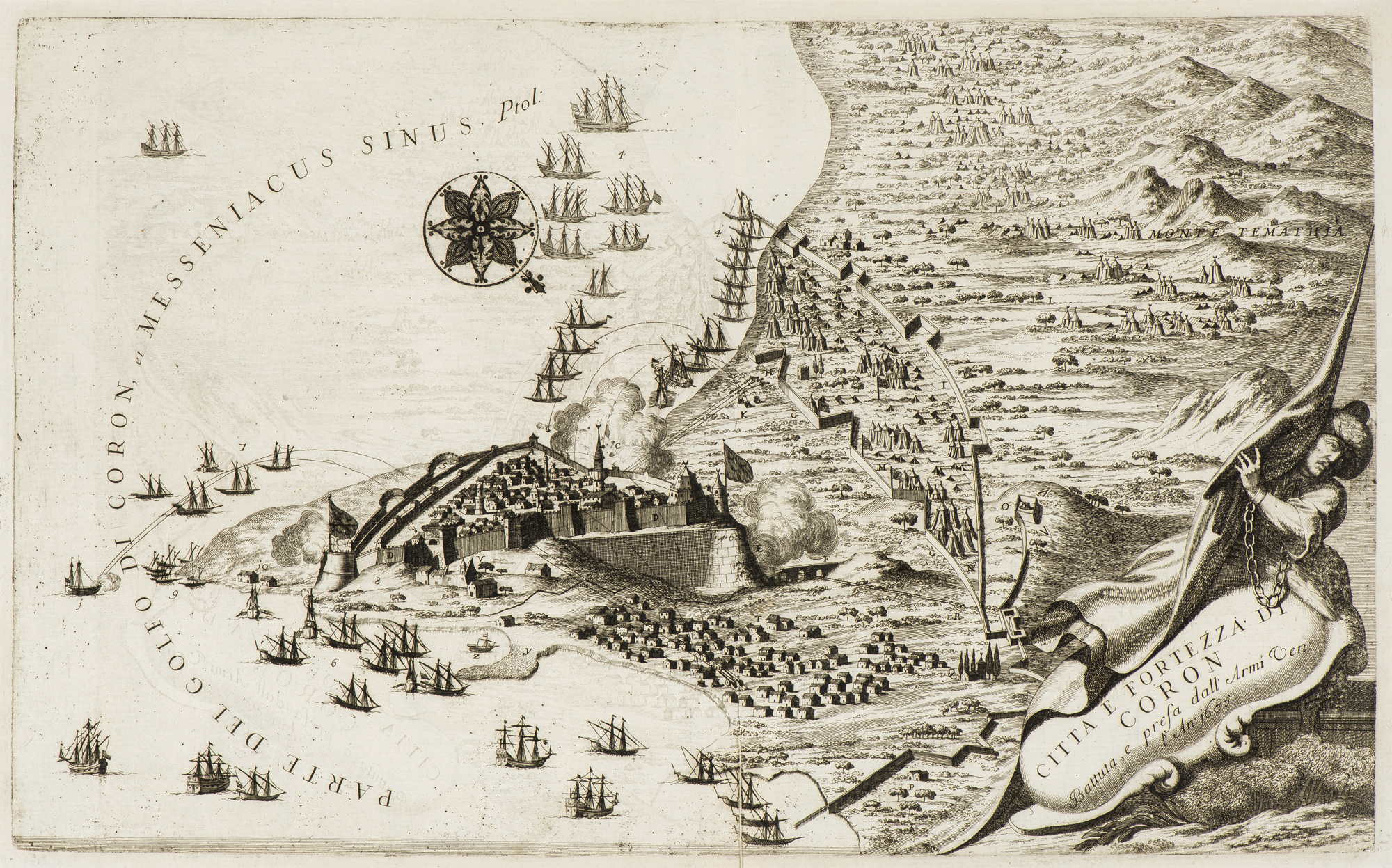
The Siege of Coron, depicted by Vincenzo Coronelli

In 1683, a new war broke out between the Habsburg monarchy and the Ottomans, with a large Ottoman army advancing towards Vienna. In response to this, a Holy League was formed. After the Ottoman army was defeated in the Battle of Vienna, the Venetians decided to use the opportunity of the weakening of Ottoman power and their distraction on the Danubian front to reconquer its lost territories in the Aegean and Dalmatia. On 25 April 1684, the Most Serene Republic declared war on the Ottomans.

Aware that it would have to rely on its own strength for success, Venice prepared for the war by securing financial and military aid in men and ships from Hospitaller Malta, the Duchy of Savoy, the Papal States, and the Knights of St. Stephen. In addition, the Venetians enrolled large numbers of mercenaries from Italy and the German states, especially Saxony and Brunswick.

==== Operations in the Ionian Sea ====
In mid-June, the Venetian fleet moved from the Adriatic towards the Ottoman-held Ionian Islands. The first target was the island of Lefkada (Santa Maura), which fell, after a siege of 16 days, on 6 August 1684. The Venetians, aided by Greek irregulars, then crossed into the mainland and started raiding the opposite shore of Acarnania. Most of the area was soon under Venetian control, and the fall of the forts of Preveza and Vonitsa in late September removed the last Ottoman bastions. These early successes were important for the Venetians not only for reasons of morale, but because they secured their communications with Venice, denied to the Ottomans the possibility of threatening the Ionian Islands or of ferrying troops via western Greece to the Peloponnese, and because these successes encouraged the Greeks to cooperate with them against the Ottomans.

==== The conquest of the Morea ====
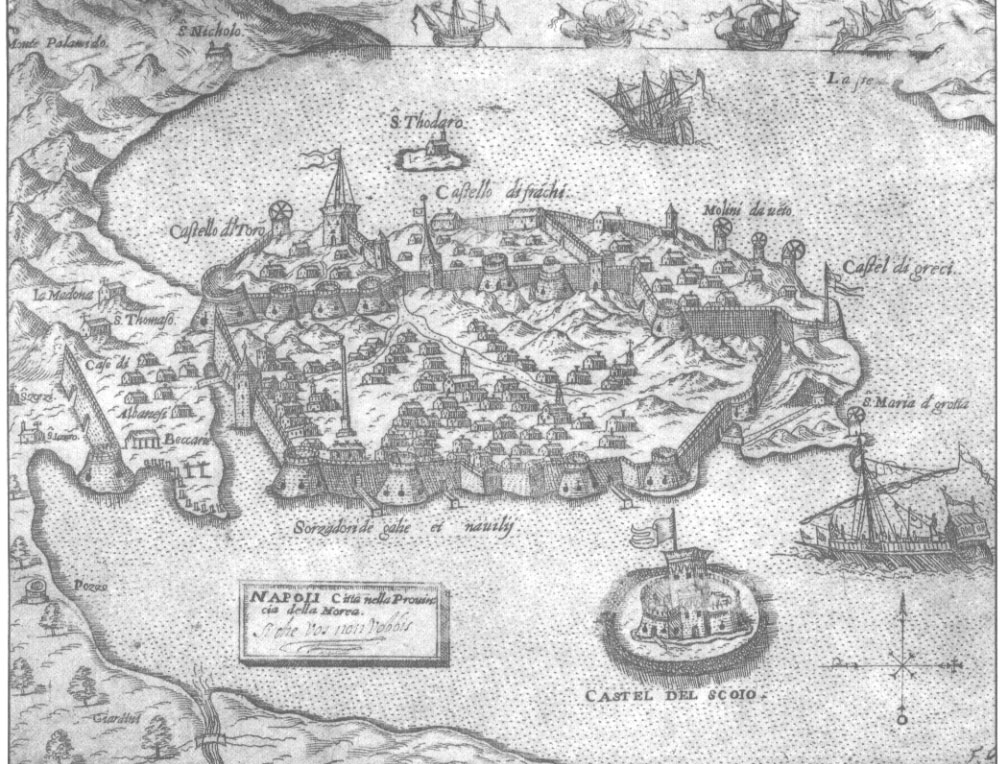
Nafplion, or Napoli di Romagna, in the mid-16th century

Having secured his rear during the previous year, Morosini set his sights upon the Peloponnese, where the Greeks, especially the Maniots, had begun showing signs of revolt and communicated with Morosini, promising to rise up in his aid. Ismail Pasha, the new military commander of Morea, learned of this and invaded the Mani Peninsula with 10,000 men, reinforcing the three forts that the Ottomans already garrisoned, and compelled the Maniots to give up hostages to secure their loyalty. As a result, the Maniots remained uncommitted when, on 25 June 1685, the Venetian army, 8,100 men strong, landed outside the former Venetian fort of Koroni and laid siege to it. The castle surrendered after 49 days, on 11 August, and the garrison was massacred. After this success, Morosini embarked his troops towards the town of Kalamata, in order to encourage the Maniots to revolt. The Venetian army, reinforced by 3,300 Saxons and under the command of general Hannibal von Degenfeld, defeated a Turkish force of ca. 10,000 outside Kalamata on 14 September, and by the end of the month, all of Mani and much of Messenia were under Venetian control.

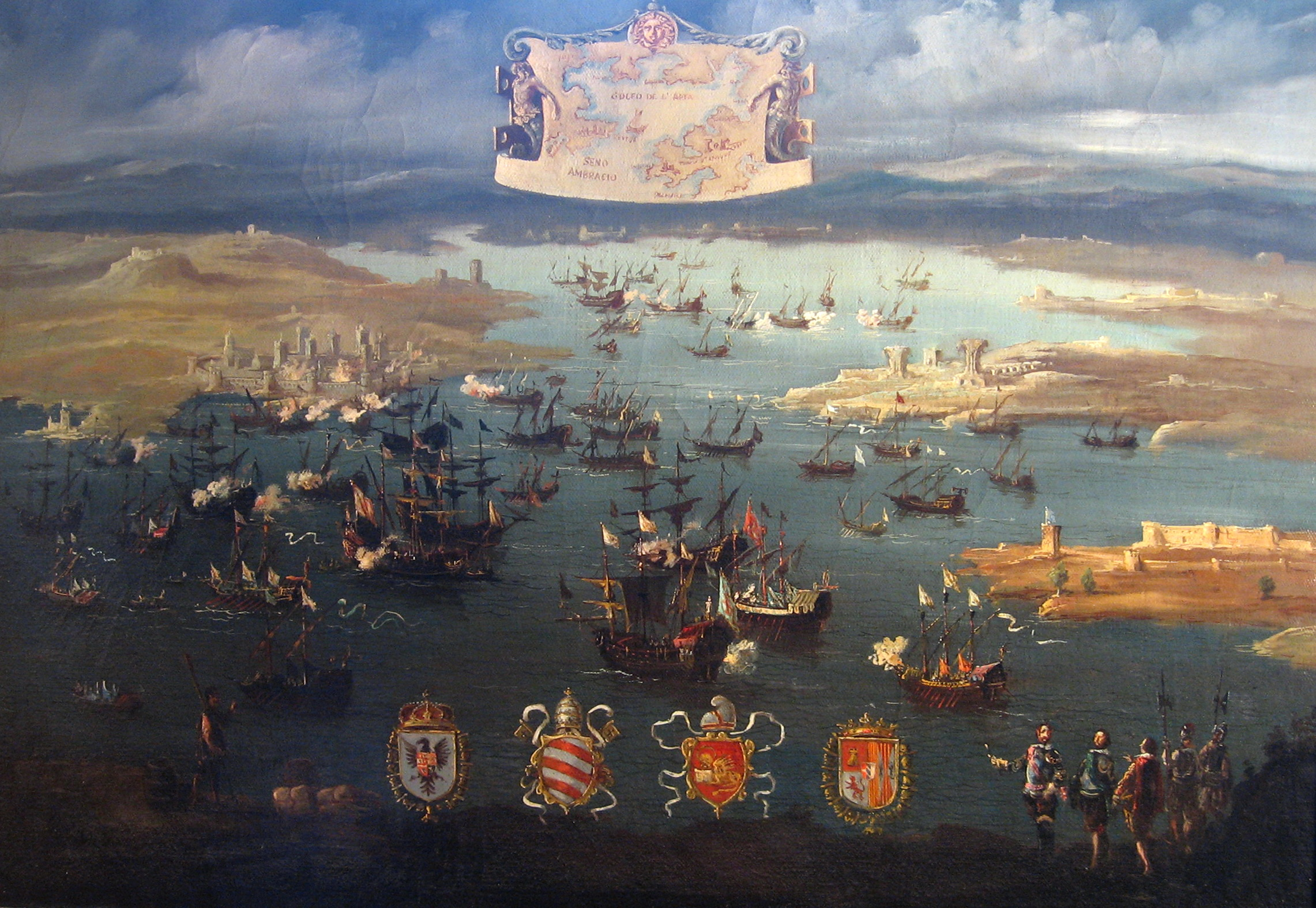
The conquest of Preveza in 1684

In October 1685, the Venetian army retreated to the Ionian Islands for winter quarters, where a plague broke out, something which would occur regularly in the next years, and take a great toll on the Venetian army, especially among the German contingents. In April 1686, the Venetians helped repulse an Ottoman attack that threatened to overrun Mani, and were reinforced from the Papal States and Tuscany. The Swedish marshal Otto Wilhelm Königsmarck was appointed head of the land forces, while Morosini retained command of the fleet. On 3 June, Königsmarck took Pylos and proceeded to lay siege the fortress of Navarino. A relief force under Ismail Pasha was defeated on 16 June, and the next day the fort surrendered. The garrison and the Muslim population were transported to Tripoli. Methoni (Modon) followed on 7 July, after an effective bombardment destroyed the fort's walls, and its inhabitants were also transferred to Tripoli. The Venetians then advanced towards Argos and Nafplion, which was then the most important town in the Peloponnese. The Venetian army, ca. 12,000 strong, landed around Nafplion between 30 July and 4 August. Königsmarck immediately led an assault upon the hill of Palamidi, then unfortified, which overlooked the town. Despite the Venetians' success in capturing Palamidi, the arrival of a 7,000 strong Ottoman army under Ismail Pasha at Argos rendered their position difficult. The Venetians' initial assault against the relief army succeeded in taking Argos and forcing the pasha to retreat to Corinth, but for two weeks, from 16 August, Königsmarck's forces were forced to continuously repulse attacks from Ismail Pasha's forces, fight off the sorties of the besieged Ottoman garrison and cope with a new outbreak of plague. On 29 August 1686 Ismail Pasha attacked the Venetian camp, but was heavily defeated. With the defeat of the relief army, Nafplion was forced to surrender on 3 September. News of this major victory was greeted in Venice with joy and celebration. Nafplion became the Venetians' major base, while Ismail Pasha withdrew to Achaea after strengthening the garrisons at Corinth, which controlled the passage to central Greece.

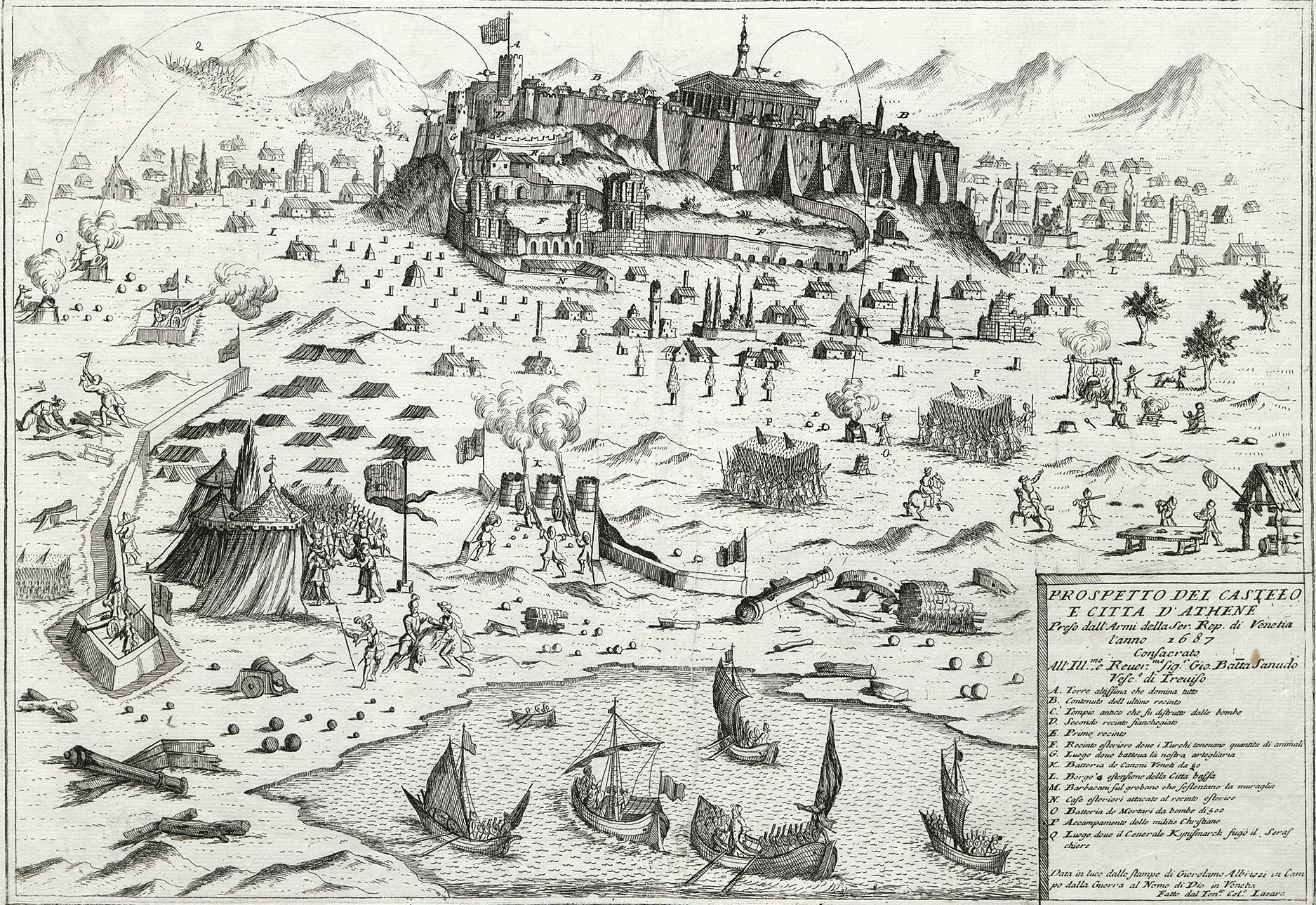
Depiction of the Venetian siege of the Acropolis of Athens during 1687

Despite losses to the plague during the autumn and winter of 1686, Morosini's forces were replenished by the arrival of new German mercenary corps from Hanover in spring 1687. Thus strengthened, he was able to move against the last major Ottoman bastion in the Peloponnese, the town of Patras and the fort of Rion, which along with its twin at Antirrion controlled the entrance to the Corinthian Gulf (the "Little Dardanelles"). On 22 July 1687, Morosini, with a force of 14,000, landed outside Patras, where the new Ottoman commander, Mehmed Pasha, had established himself. Mehmed, with an army of roughly equal size, attacked the Venetian force immediately after it landed, but was defeated and forced to retreat. At this point panic spread among the Ottoman forces, and the Venetians were able, within a few days, to capture the citadel of Patras, and the forts of Rion, Antirrion, and Nafpaktos (Lepanto) without any opposition, as their garrisons abandoned them. This new success caused great joy in Venice, and honours were heaped on Morosini and his officers. Morosini received the victory title "Peloponnesiacus", and a bronze bust of his was displayed in the Great Hall, something never before done for a living citizen. The Venetians followed up this success with the reduction of the last Ottoman bastions in the Peloponnese, including Corinth, which was occupied on 7 August, and Mystra, which surrendered later in the month. The Peloponnese was under complete Venetian control, and only the fort of Monemvasia (Malvasia) in the southeast continued to resist, holding out until 1690.

=== Polish–Ottoman & Austro-Turkish Wars (1683–1699) ===
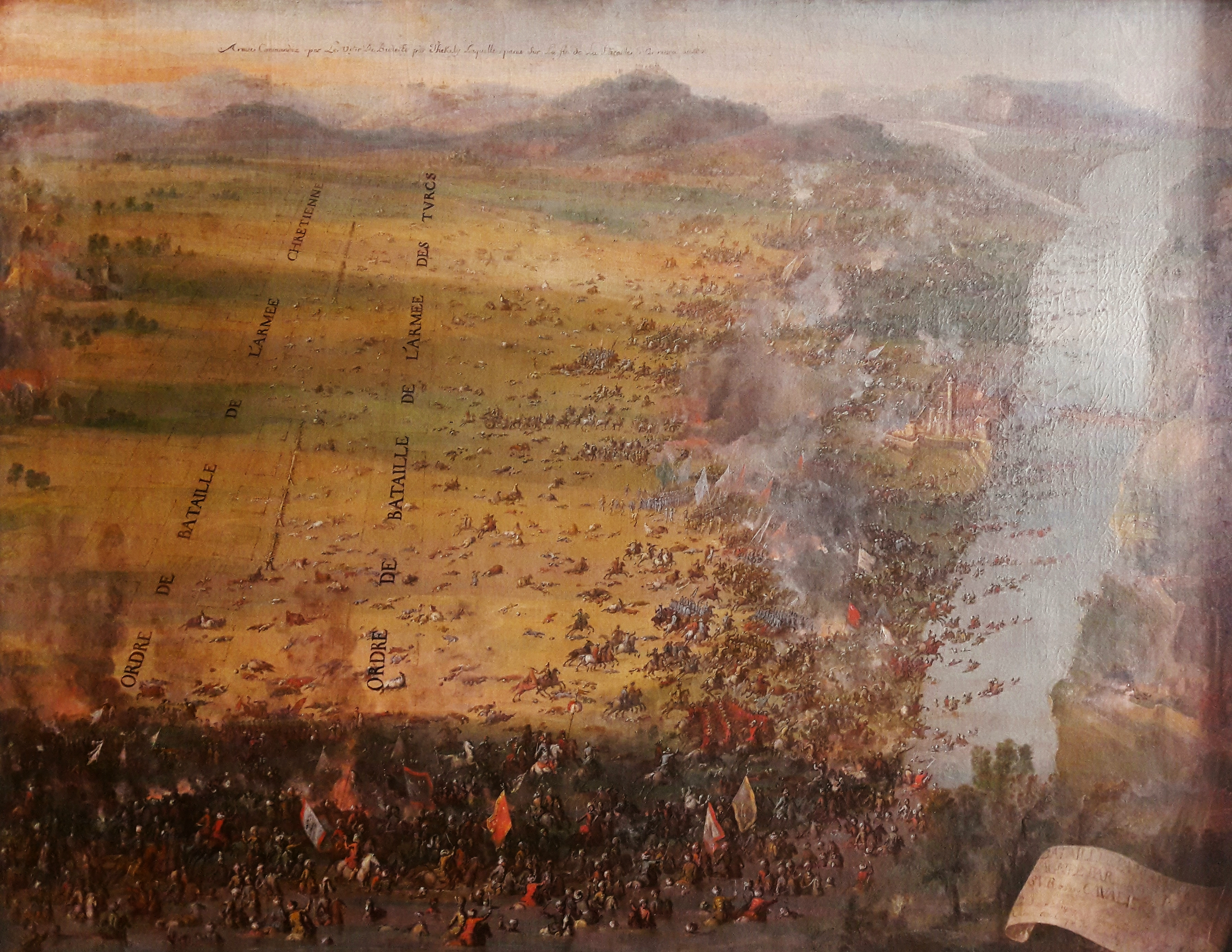
The Battle of Párkány in October 1683

After a few years of peace, the Ottoman Empire attacked the Habsburg monarchy again. The Turks almost captured Vienna, but King John III Sobieski of Poland led a Christian alliance that defeated them in the Battle of Vienna, which shook the Ottoman Empire's hegemony in south-eastern Europe.

A new Holy League was initiated by Pope Innocent XI and encompassed the Holy Roman Empire (headed by the Habsburg monarchy), joined by the Venetian Republic and Poland in 1684 and the Tsardom of Russia in 1686. The Ottomans suffered three decisive defeats against the Holy Roman Empire after siege of Buda: the second Battle of Mohács in 1687, the Battle of Slankamen in 1691 and the Battle of Zenta a decade later, in 1697.

On the smaller Polish front, after the battles of 1683 (Vienna and Parkany), Sobieski, after his proposal for the League to start a major coordinated offensive, undertook a rather unsuccessful offensive in Moldavia in 1686, with the Ottomans refusing a major engagement and harassing the army. For the next four years Poland would blockade the key fortress at Kamenets, and Ottoman Tatars would raid the borderlands. In 1691, Sobieski undertook another expedition to Moldavia, with slightly better results, but still with no decisive victories.

The last battle of the campaign was the Battle of Podhajce in 1698, where a Polish hetman named Feliks Kazimierz Potocki defeated the Ottoman incursion into the Commonwealth. The League won the war in 1699 and forced the Ottoman Empire to sign the Treaty of Karlowitz. The Ottomans thereby lost much of their European possessions, with Podolia (including Kamenets) returned to Poland.

=== Russo-Turkish War (1686–1700) ===
During the war, the Russian army organized the Crimean campaigns of 1687 and 1689, which both ended in Russian defeats. Despite these setbacks, Russia launched the Azov campaigns in 1695 and 1696, and after laying siege to Azov in 1695 successfully occupied the city in 1696.

== Conclusion ==
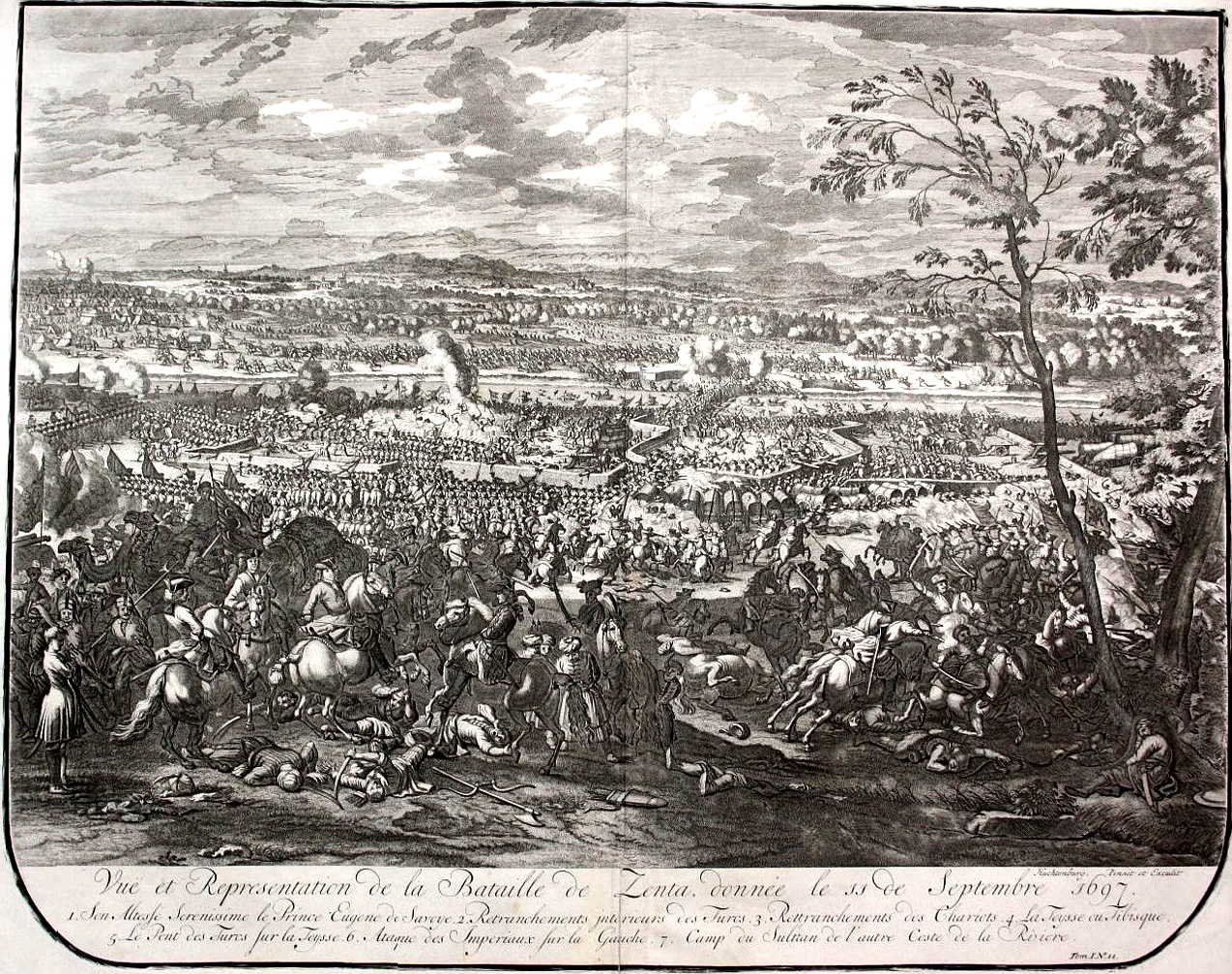
The Battle of Zenta in September 1697

On 11 September 1697, the Battle of Zenta was fought just south of the Ottoman ruled town of Zenta. During the battle, Habsburg Imperial forces routed the Ottoman forces while the Ottomans were crossing the Tisa River near the town. This resulted in the Habsburg forces killing over 30,000 Ottomans and dispersing the rest. This crippling defeat was the ultimate factor of the Ottoman Empire signing the Treaty of Karlowitz on 22 January 1699, ending the Great Turkish War. This treaty resulted in the transfer of most of Ottoman Hungary to the Habsburgs, and after further losses in the Austro-Turkish War (1716–1718), prompted the Ottomans to adopt a more defensive military policy in the following century.

== See also ==
- Croatian-Slavonian-Dalmatian theater in Great Turkish War
- Enea Silvio Piccolomini (general), among the first Christian victims of the war.
- Scutum (constellation)
- Nils Bielke’s Campaign against the Ottoman Empire, led a force of Swedish auxiliary troops during the war.

== Sources ==
- Chasiotis, Ioannis (1975). "Η κάμψη της Οθωμανικής δυνάμεως" [The decline of Ottoman power]. Ιστορία του Ελληνικού Έθνους, Τόμος ΙΑ′: Ο ελληνισμός υπό ξένη κυριαρχία, 1669–1821 [History of the Greek Nation] (in Greek). Vol. XI: Hellenism under foreign rule, 1669–1821. Athens: Ekdotiki Athinon. pp. 8–51.
- Finlay, George (1877). A History of Greece from its Conquest by the Romans to the Present Time, B.C. 146 to A.D. 1864. Vol. V: Greece under Othoman and Venetian Domination A.D. 1453 – 1821. Oxford: Clarendon Press.
- Setton, Kenneth Meyer. Venice, Austria, and the Turks in the Seventeenth Century (Memoirs of the American Philosophical Society, 1991)
- Wilson, Peter (1998), German Armies: War and Politics, 1648–1806.
- ——— (2016), Heart of Europe: A History of the Holy Roman Empire, Cambridge: Harvard University Press.
- Mugnai, Bruno (2020). Wars and Soldiers in the Early Reign of Louis XIV – Volume 3: The Armies of the Ottoman Empire 1645–1719. Helion & Company.
- Bodart, Gaston (1916). Losses of Life in Modern Wars: Austria-Hungary; France. Oxford: Clarendon Press.
- Cantemir, Dimitrie. Viața lui Constantin Cantemir.
- Davies, Brian L. (2007). Warfare, State and Society on the Black Sea Steppe, 1500–1700. Routledge.
- Levy, Jack S. (1983). War in the Modern Great Power System: 1495–1975. University Press of Kentucky.
- Clodfelter, Micheal (2017). Warfare and Armed Conflicts: A Statistical Encyclopedia of Casualty and Other Figures, 1492–2015. McFarland.
- Wolf, John B. The Emergence of the Great Powers: 1685–1715 (1951), pp 15–53.
