= Feliks Kazimierz Potocki =

Polish noble, magnate and military leader

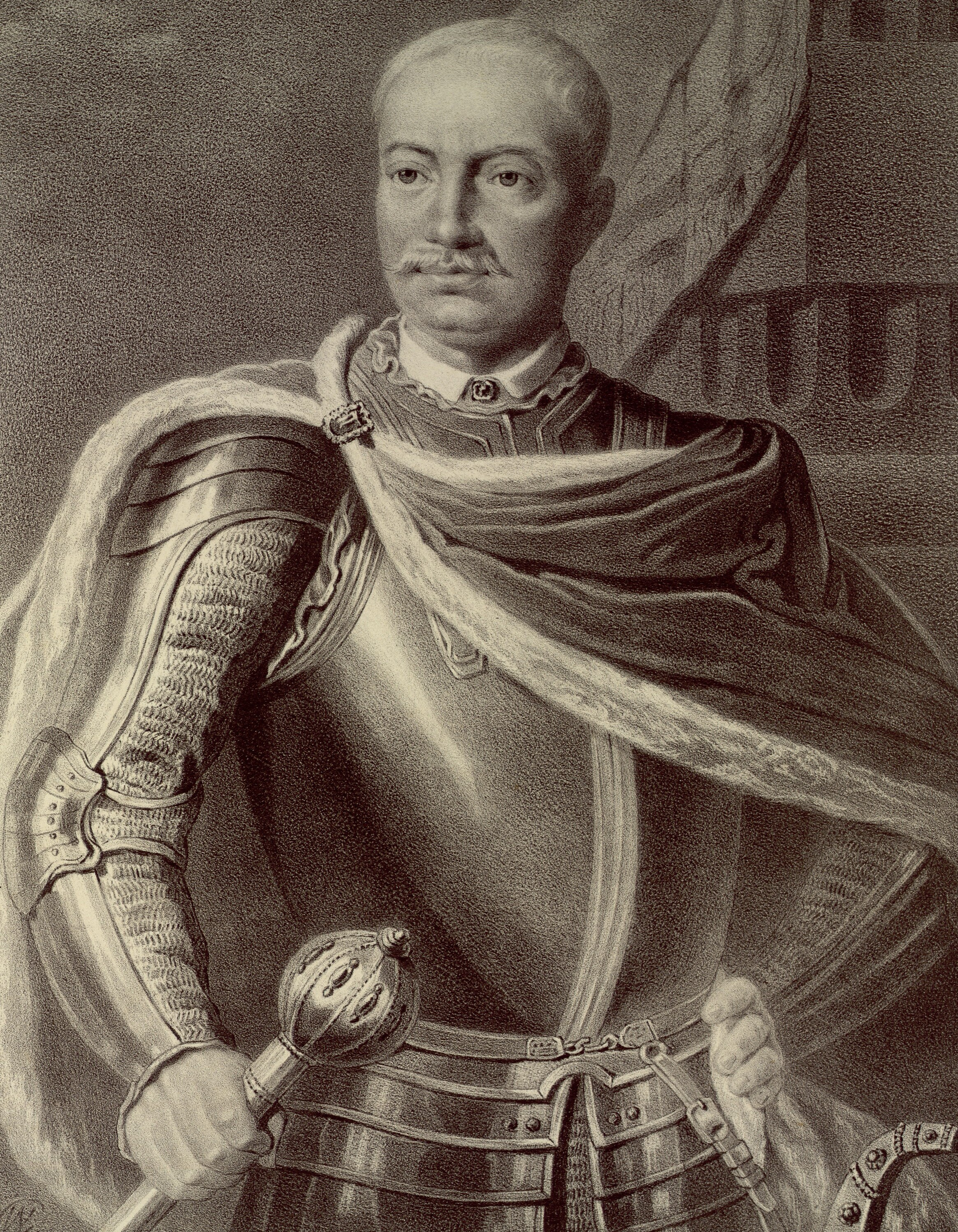
- Coat of arms: Piława
- Born: Abt. 1630
- Died: 1702
- Family: Potocki
- Consort: Krystyna Lubomirska; Konstancja Roża Łos
- Issue: with Krystyna Lubomirska; Michał Potocki; Marianna Potocka; Józef Potocki; Stanisław Potocki; Jerzy Potocki
- Father: Stanisław "Rewera" Potocki
- Mother: Zofia Kalinowska

Feliks Kazimierz "Szczęsny" Potocki (1630–1702) was a Polish noble, magnate, and military leader.

He was the son of Hetman and magnate Stanisław "Rewera" Potocki and Zofia Kalinowska, and brother of Hetman Andrzej Potocki. He married the daughter of Hetman and Marshal of the Crown Prince Jerzy Sebastian Lubomirski, Princess Krystyna Lubomirska, in 1661. Shortly before his death he married again, in 1700, his second wife being Konstancja Roża Łos.

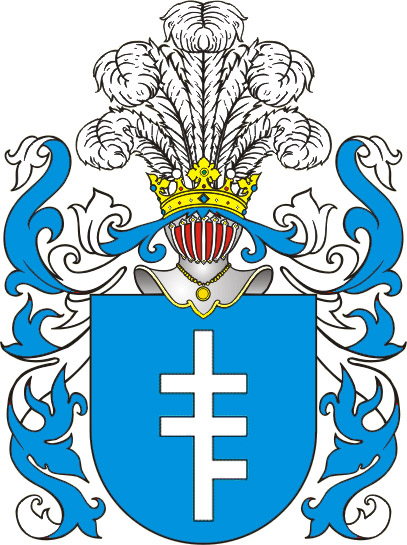
Piława coat of arms

He was Podstoli of the Crown from 1663, voivode of Sieradz Voivodship from 1669, Kijów Voivodship (Kyiv, also Kiev) from 1682, Kraków Voivodship from 1683, Field Crown Hetman from 1692, castellan of Kraków and Great Crown Hetman from 1702.

Starost of Bełz, Krasnystaw, Hrubieszów, Ropczyce, Sokal, Tłumacz and Nisko.

He fought in wars against Cossacks, Sweden, Transylvania, and Muscovy from 1655 to 1664. He commanded cavalry regiment in Battle of Chudnov (1660) and Battle of Podhajce (1667). As the Marshal of the Election Sejm on 2 May – 19 June 1669 in Warsaw, he contributed to the election of Michał Korybut Wiśniowiecki as King of Poland.

He became famous in the Chocim expedition in 1673. He signed the Sejm's election document of Jan Sobieski as King of Poland and participated in the Vienna expedition in 1683 during the Great Turkish War. He fought against the Tatars and Turks in many battles. In 1698 the Polish army under his command defeated the Tatar expedition to Poland in the battle of Podhajce.
