= Lopushne, Lopushne rural hromada, Kremenets Raion, Ternopil Oblast =

Rural locality in Ternopil Oblast, Ukraine

Lopushne Лопушне
- Interactive map of Lopushne
- Location in Ternopil Oblast Lopushne (Ternopil Oblast)
- Coordinates: 49°55′1″N 25°28′6″E
- Country: Ukraine
- Oblast: Ternopil Oblast
- Raion: Kremenets Raion
- Hromada: Lopushne rural hromada

Population (2001)
  - Total: 743
- Time zone: UTC+2 (EET)
  - Summer (DST): UTC+3 (EEST)
- Postal code: 47054

Lopushne (Ukrainian: Лопушне) is a village in Ukraine, Ternopil Oblast, Kremenets Raion, Lopushne rural hromada. After the liquidation of the Kremenets Raion (1940–2020) on 19 July 2020, the village became part of the Kremenets Raion.

== Bibliography ==
- (in Ukrainian) Ю. Ковальков, Б. Хаварівський., Лопушне // Ternopil Encyclopedic Dictionary: in 4 v. / editorial board: H. Yavorskyi and other, Ternopil: "Zbruch", 2005, V. 2: К—О, S. 392. — ISBN 966-528-199-2.
- "Łopuszno 1) wś nad Ikwą, pow. krzemieniecki". Geographical Dictionary of the Kingdom of Poland (in Polish). p. 273.
