= Krutniv, Ternopil Oblast =

Rural locality in Ternopil Oblast, Ukraine

Krutniv Крутнів
- Interactive map of Krutniv
- Location in Ternopil Oblast Krutniv (Ternopil Oblast)
- Coordinates: 49°57′15″N 25°27′49″E
- Country: Ukraine
- Oblast: Ternopil Oblast
- Raion: Kremenets Raion
- Hromada: Lopushne rural hromada

Population (2001)
  - Total: 626
- Time zone: UTC+2 (EET)
  - Summer (DST): UTC+3 (EEST)
- Postal code: 47054

Krutniv (Ukrainian: Крутнів) is a village in Ukraine, Ternopil Oblast, Kremenets Raion, Lopushne rural hromada. After the liquidation of the Kremenets Raion (1940–2020) on 19 July 2020, the village became part of the Kremenets Raion.

== Bibliography ==
- (in Ukrainian) Хаварівський Б., Крутнів // Ternopil Encyclopedic Dictionary: in 4 v. / editorial board: H. Yavorskyi and other, Ternopil: "Zbruch", 2005, V. 2: К—О, S. 252. — ISBN 966-528-199-2.
- "Krutniów, wś, pow. krzemieniecki". Geographical Dictionary of the Kingdom of Poland (in Polish). 4. Warszawa: Kasa im. Józefa Mianowskiego. 1883. p. 743.
- "Krutniów". Geographical Dictionary of the Kingdom of Poland (in Polish). p. 174.
