= Bashuky =

Rural locality in Ternopil Oblast, Ukraine

Bashuky Башуки
- Interactive map of Bashuky
- Location in Ternopil Oblast Bashuky (Ternopil Oblast)
- Coordinates: 49°48′20″N 25°32′04″E
- Country: Ukraine
- Oblast: Ternopil Oblast
- Raion: Kremenets Raion
- Hromada: Lopushne rural hromada

Population (2001)
  - Total: 919
- Time zone: UTC+2 (EET)
  - Summer (DST): UTC+3 (EEST)
- Postal code: 47065

Bashuky (Ukrainian: Башуки) is a village in Ukraine, Ternopil Oblast, Kremenets Raion, Lopushne rural hromada. After the liquidation of the Kremenets Raion (1940–2020) on 19 July 2020, the village became part of the Kremenets Raion.

== Bibliography ==
- "Baszuki, pow. krzemieniecki". Geographical Dictionary of the Kingdom of Poland (in Polish). p. 92.
