= Roztoky, Ternopil Oblast =

Village in Ukraine

Roztoky Розтоки
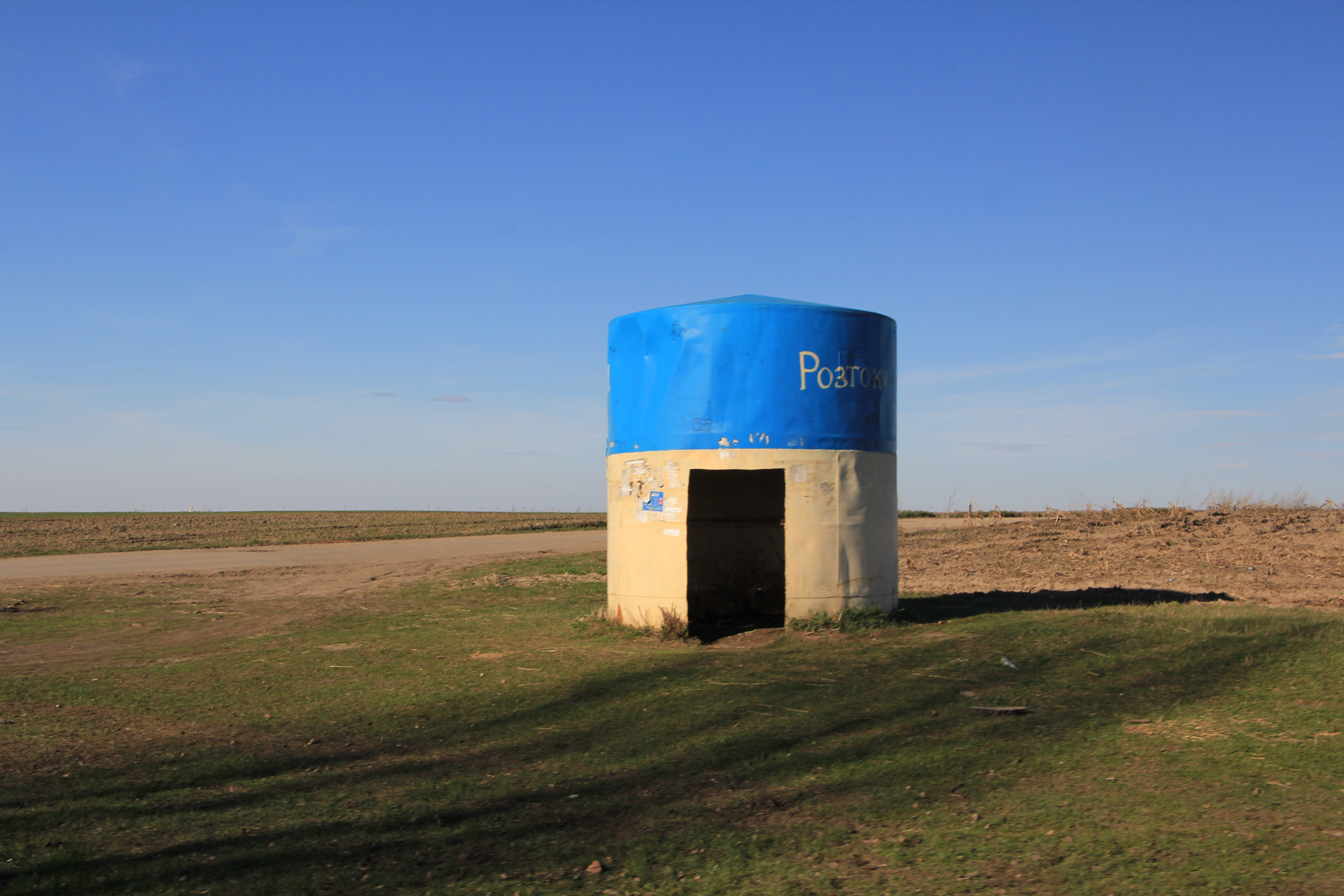
- Interactive map of Roztoky
- Location in Ternopil Oblast Roztoky (Ternopil Oblast)
- Coordinates: 49°55′2″N 25°31′24″E
- Country: Ukraine
- Oblast: Ternopil Oblast
- Raion: Kremenets Raion
- Hromada: Lopushne rural hromada

Population (2025)
  - Total: 871
- Time zone: UTC+2 (EET)
  - Summer (DST): UTC+3 (EEST)
- Postal code: 47055

Roztoky (Ukrainian: Розтоки) is a village in Ukraine, Ternopil Oblast, Kremenets Raion, Lopushne rural hromada. After the liquidation of the Kremenets Raion (1940–2020) on 19 July 2020, the village became part of the Kremenets Raion.

== Bibliography ==
- (in Ukrainian) Ханас В., Розтоки // Ternopil Encyclopedic Dictionary: in 4 v. / editorial board: H. Yavorskyi and other, Ternopil: "Zbruch", 2008, V. 3: П—Я, S. 189. — ISBN 978-966-528-279-2.
- "Rostoki (pow.krzemieniecki)". Geographical Dictionary of the Kingdom of Poland (in Polish). 9. Warszawa: Kasa im. Józefa Mianowskiego. 1888. p. 803.
