= Raslavka =

Rural locality in Ternopil Oblast, Ukraine

Raslavka Раславка
- Interactive map of Raslavka
- Location in Ternopil Oblast Raslavka (Ternopil Oblast)
- Coordinates: 49°58′24″N 25°26′22″E
- Country: Ukraine
- Oblast: Ternopil Oblast
- Raion: Kremenets Raion
- Hromada: Lopushne rural hromada

Population (2007)
  - Total: 404
- Time zone: UTC+2 (EET)
  - Summer (DST): UTC+3 (EEST)
- Postal code: 47054

Raslavka (Ukrainian: Раславка) is a village in Ukraine, Ternopil Oblast, Kremenets Raion, Lopushne rural hromada. After the liquidation of the Kremenets Raion (1940–2020) on 19 July 2020, the village became part of the Kremenets Raion.

== Bibliography ==
- (in Ukrainian) Хаварівський Б., Раславка // Ternopil Encyclopedic Dictionary: in 4 v. / editorial board: H. Yavorskyi and other, Ternopil: "Zbruch", 2008, V. 3: П—Я, S. 171. — ISBN 978-966-528-279-2.
