= Mala Horianka =

Rural locality in Ternopil Oblast, Ukraine

Mala Horianka Мала Горянка
- Interactive map of Mala Horianka
- Location in Ternopil Oblast Mala Horianka (Ternopil Oblast)
- Coordinates: 49°52′32″N 25°32′10″E
- Country: Ukraine
- Oblast: Ternopil Oblast
- Raion: Kremenets Raion
- Hromada: Lopushne rural hromada

Population (2001)
  - Total: 206
- Time zone: UTC+2 (EET)
  - Summer (DST): UTC+3 (EEST)
- Postal code: 47054

Mala Horianka (Ukrainian: Мала Горянка) is a village in Ukraine, Ternopil Oblast, Kremenets Raion, Lopushne rural hromada. After the liquidation of the Kremenets Raion (1940–2020) on 19 July 2020, the village became part of the Kremenets Raion.

== Bibliography ==
- (in Ukrainian) Бігус М., Мала Горянка // Ternopil Encyclopedic Dictionary: in 4 v. / editorial board: H. Yavorskyi and other, Ternopil: "Zbruch", 2005, V. 2: К—О, S. 437. — ISBN 966-528-199-2.
- "Horynka Wielka i Mała". Geographical Dictionary of the Kingdom of Poland (in Polish). p. 586.
