= Józef Felicjan Potocki =

Polish noble (died 1723)

Józef Potocki
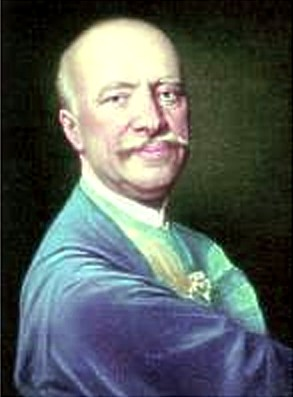
- Portrait
- Coat of arms: Piława
- Born: 17th century
- Died: 1723
- Family: Potocki
- Consort: Teresa Teofilia Cetner
- Issue: Franciszek Salezy Potocki; Antonina Potocka
- Father: Feliks Kazimierz Potocki
- Mother: Krystyna Lubomirska

Józef Felicjan Potocki (c. before 1688 – 1723) was a Polish noble (szlachcic). He became a Crown Great Guard (Polish: Strażnik Wielki Koronny) in 1720, and was also the starost of Bełz.
