= Battle of Martynów (1699) =

1699 battle

- Part of Crimean–Nogai slave raids in Eastern Europe
Date	21 February 1699
Location	Martynów Nowy, Polish-Lithuanian Commonwealth 49°13′N 24°33′E
Result	Crimean Tatar victory

Belligerents
Polish-Lithuanian Commonwealth	Crimean Khanate

Commanders and leaders
Unknown	Unknown

Strength
600	less than 5,000 (Polish sources)

Casualties and losses
Unknown	Unknown

The Battle of Martynów - took place at Martynów on 21 February 1699, ending in defeat of the Polish army. It was a battle between the armies of the Polish-Lithuanian Commonwealth and the Crimean Khanate. (Note: This was not the last plundering of the territories of the Polish-Lithuanian Commonwealth by the Tatars. Russian Russian troops, with the support of Cossacks and Kalmyks, defeated the Tatars during the Russo-Turkish war near Gorodishchina on February 15, 1739. Before this battle, the Tatars invaded and burned Krylov and Chigirin, and also attacked several villages of the Chigirinsky starost, capturing prisoners. On April 16, the newspaper Z Warszawy reported that the Tatars had released 988 people).

== Background ==
In December 1698, a Polish-Turkish peace treaty was signed in Karlowitz with provisions related to the end of the Polish-Turkish war (1683-1699), the Tatars were forbidden to invade the lands of the Republic.

During the winter, approximately 12,800 troops were stationed in military groupings (Moldavian, Pokuttya, Podestan and Lviv) in the border areas. Their task was to repel Tatar raids aimed at capturing slaves (jasyr) and seizing plunder. Tatar tactic included avoiding losses of their own, which resulted in avoidance of pitched battles with enemy troops.

== Tatar invasion ==
The Tatar troops set out from Kamianets-Podilskyi in mid-January. Polish Historian Andrzej Gliwa estimated that the expeditionary force consisted of 4,000 to 5,000 horsemen, including approximately 3,000 Budjak Tatars supported by Wallachians and Moldovans. The units reached Medenychi via Sniatyn and established a camp there. Operating from that base between February 17 and 19, they plundered the southeastern part of the Przemyśl region. Around 7,000 people were taken captive. In the Przemyśl region, 92 villages were devastated (~10% of all). During the Tatar retreat from the Przemyśl region, Polish forces routed a Tatar detachment laden with plunder and captives; in the ensuing clash, several dozen Tatars were captured and many others were killed.

== Battle ==
On 21 February 1699, at the Dniester crossing near Martynov, there was a clash between Polish forces and part of the Tatar forces. The attack was made by about 600 soldiers including the Wallachians of Adam Sieniawski and the hussars of Michał Warszycki. The Tatars successfully repulsed the Poles and took prisoners.

== Aftermath ==
The Tatars left with the captured jasyr, after crossing the Dniester they continued their plundering on the territory of the Halich lands (area of Podkamień, Rohatyn, Bursztyn and Mariampol) and partially of the Lviv lands. The Tatars left the lands of the Commonwealth around 22–23 February, just before the Treaty of Karlowitz entered into force on February 25. The Ottoman side used this fact to argue that the terms of the treaty had not been violated. Negotiations resulted in the release of only about 10% of those taken prisoner.
