= List of Ukrainian Americans =

There are many Ukrainian-Americans in the United States, including both original immigrants who obtained American citizenship and their American descendants. To be included in this list, the person must have a Wikipedia article showing they are Ukrainian American or must have references showing they are Ukrainian American and are sufficiently notable to merit a Wikipedia article.

== Actors and comedians ==
- Nick Adams – actor, screenwriter
- Odessa Adlon – actress
- Nina Arianda – actress and Tony Award winner
- Anthony Atamanuik – actor and comedian
- Pat Bilon – actor
- Natalie Burn – actress
- Matt Czuchry – actor
- Dimitri Diatchenko – actor
- Diana Domna — actress
- Irina Dvorovenko – ballet dancer and actress
- George Dzundza – actor
- Erika Eleniak – actress, father is of Ukrainian descent
- Taissa Farmiga – actress
- Vera Farmiga – actress
- John Hodiak – actor
- Dustin Hoffman – actor, of Jewish descent
- Milla Jovovich – actress, supermodel and musician; born in Kyiv, to a Serbian father and a Russian mother
- Danny Kaye – actor, of Jewish descent
- Alla Korot – actress
- Kiril Kulish – stage actor, Ukrainian Jewish
- Mila Kunis – actress and voice actress, Ukrainian Jewish
- Oksana Lada – actress, born in western Ukraine
- Laryssa Lauret – Broadway, television, and film actress, of Ukrainian descent
- Olga Lezhneva – actress born in Kharkiv; Ukrainian mother
- Traci Lords – actress born Nora Kuzma; her father was of Ukrainian ancestry
- Walter Matthau – actor, of Jewish descent
- Mike Mazurki – actor
- Boris McGiver – actor
- Alex Meneses – actress
- George Montgomery – actor
- Matthew Montgomery – actor
- Leonard Nimoy – actor, Ukrainian Jewish
- Larisa Oleynik – actress, of Ukrainian descent on her father's side
- Bree Olson – actress and media personality, former pornographic actress
- Kim Ostrenko – theater and movie actress, with significant roles in 16 movies; played Alice Connellan in Dolphin Tale (2011)
- Holly Palance – actress
- Jack Palance – actor
- Ryan Potter - actor
- Sasha Roiz – actor, Ukrainian Jewish
- Lizabeth Scott – actress, second-generation Ukrainian on both sides
- Amy Seimetz – actress
- William Shatner – actor
- Isaac Liev Schreiber – actor
- John Spencer – actor; Ukrainian–American on the maternal side
- Anna Sten – actress
- Michael Stoyanov – actor
- Lusia Strus – actress
- Mia Tyler – actress, model
- Igor Vovkovinskiy – Ukrainian-American law student, interviewee, and actor, best known for once being the tallest person in the United States, at 7 feet 8.33 inches (234.5 cm); part of Ukraine's stage performance at the Eurovision Song Contest 2013
- Zoë Wanamaker – actress, played Susan Harper in the television series My Family; father of Ukrainian Jewish extraction
- Jeremy Allen White – actor
- Katheryn Winnick – actress
- Natalie Wood – actress
- Danika Yarosh – actress
- Chris Zylka – actor

== Film, media, radio, television ==
- Juliya Chernetsky – TV personality
- Edward Dmytryk (1908–1999) – film director who was amongst the Hollywood 10, a group of blacklisted film industry professionals who served time in prison for being in contempt of Congress during the McCarthy-era Red Scare
- Andrea Feczko – TV personality
- Vera Farmiga – actress and director
- Mila Kunis – actress
- Taissa Farmiga – actress
- James Gray – director, producer and screenwriter, (Two lovers, Ad Astra) Jewish-Ukrainian
- Basil Iwanyk – Hollywood producer, noted for producing films such as, Clash of the Titans, John Wick, We Are Marshall.
- Kim Kamando – radio personality
- Taras Kulakov – life hack YouTuber better known as CrazyRussianHacker
- Tom Leykis – radio personality
- Andrij Parekh – cinematographer
- Matej Silecky – director, professional figure skater
- Steven Spielberg – director, producer and screenwriter, of Jewish descent
- Gene Stupnitsky – writer and producer
- Alex Trebek – television host
- DJ Vlad – interviewer, journalist, YouTuber, and former disc jockey, of Jewish descent
- Kendra Wilkinson – TV personality
- Nikocado Avocado – YouTuber, known for his Mukbangs

== Artists and designers ==
- Alexander Archipenko – artist, sculptor
- Nudie Cohn – fashion designer, of Jewish descent
- John Eberson – architect best known for his atmospheric theatre style theatres. His most notable surviving theatres include the Palace Theatre, State Theatre, Majestic Theatre, Orpheum Theatre, Paramount Theatre and Tampa Theatre.
- Paul Himmel – fashion and documentary photographer, of Jewish descent
- Jacques Hnizdovsky – stylized realist
- Peter Hujar – photographer
- Andrei Kushnir – artist painter
- Abram Molarsky – impressionist painter, of Jewish descent
- Luba Perchyshyn – pysanky maker, teacher, in Minneapolis
- Janet Sobel – artist "drip painting"
- Jim Steranko – graphic artist, comic book writer/artist, historian, magician, publisher and film production illustrator
- Bill Tytla – original Disney animator

== Chess players ==
- Vassily Ivanchuk
- Boris Baczynsky
- Alexander Onischuk
- Sam Palatnik
- Stepan Popel
- Katerina Rohonyan
- Anna Zatonskih

== Government and civil servants ==
- Andrew P. Bakaj – former CIA official; U.S. Attorney and lead counsel for the Whisteblower during the Impeachment Inquiry and the subsequent first Impeachment of President Donald Trump.
- Christopher A. Boyko – US District Court Judge
- Joseph V. Charyk – first director of the US National Reconnaissance Office
- Lev Dobriansky – professor of economics at Georgetown University and anti-communist advocate, he served as United States Ambassador to the Bahamas from 1982 to 1986
- Paula Dobriansky – American foreign policy expert; has served in key roles as a diplomat and policy maker in the administrations of five U.S. presidents, both Democrat and Republican; specialist in Eastern Europe, the former Soviet Union, and political-military affairs
- Bohdan A. Futey – US Federal Claims Court Judge
- Ruth Bader Ginsburg – US Supreme Court Justice
- Natalie Jaresko – former Ukrainian Minister of Finance
- Boris Lushniak – former Acting Surgeon General of the United States
- Julia Mullock – Imperial High Princess of Korea
- Roman Popadiuk – former US Ambassador to Ukraine
- Victoria Spartz – former Indiana state Senator, Member of the U.S. House of Representatives from Indiana's 5th district
- Ulana Suprun – former acting Ukrainian Minister of Healthcare
- Timothy Tymkovich – US Court of Appeals for the Tenth Circuit, Chief Judge
- Eugene Vindman – former deputy legal advisor for the United States National Security Council, Member of the U.S. House of Representatives from Virginia's 7th district
- Kateryna Yushchenko – former US State Department Official and former First Lady of Ukraine

== Engineers and business ==
- David Baszucki – Founder and CEO of the Roblox Corporation, Canadian-born
- Bohdan Bejmuk – aerospace engineer
- Martin Cooper – American inventor, "father of the cell phone", of Jewish descent
- William Dzus – inventor of Dzus turnlock fasteners for aircraft
- Paul Eremenko – former Google executive
- Nick Holonyak – inventor of the LED
- Andrew Kay – President and CEO of now defunct Kaypro
- Brianne Kimmel – venture capitalist and angel investor
- Jan Koum – founder of WhatsApp, of Jewish descent
- Max Levchin – co-founder of PayPal, of Jewish descent
- Daniel Milstein – founder and CEO of Gold Star financial group; author of 17 Cents and a Dream
- Igor Pasternak – CEO of Aeros
- Michael Pocalyko – investment banker
- Jay Pritzker – entrepreneur and founder of the Hyatt Hotel chain, of Jewish descent, member of the Pritzker family
- Lubomyr Romankiw – inventor; engineer
- Vlad Skots – founder and president of USKO Inc., chairman of the Ukrainian-American House
- Stephen Timoshenko – engineer, reputed to be the father of modern engineering mechanics
- Harold Willens – Jewish businessman, nuclear freeze activist, political donor
- Harry Winston – businessman; jeweler
- Steve Wozniak – businessman
- Jacob Millman – Professor, Columbia University, Author, Millman's Theorem

== Military officers and war heroes ==
- Jeremy Michael Boorda – US Admiral-Chief of Naval Operations
- Myron F. Diduryk – Vietnam War Silver Star recipient
- Samuel Jaskilka – General-Assistant Commandant of the US Marine Corps
- Nicholas S. H. Krawciw – US Army Major General
- Nicholas Minue – World War II Medal of Honor recipient
- Nicholas Oresko – World War II Medal of Honor recipient
- Alex Vindman – US Army lieutenant colonel serving as director for European affairs for the NSC

== Musicians ==
- Bohdan Andrusyshyn – singer; Ukrainian father
- Lydia Artymiw – concert pianist and McKnight professor of piano
- Renata Babak – opera singer
- Alina Baraz – singer-songwriter, first Ukrainian in her family to be born in America
- Leonard Bernstein – composer and conductor who was blacklisted in the 1950s, of Jewish descent
- Michael Bolton – pop rock ballad singer and songwriter, of Jewish descent
- Neko Case – singer-songwriter, member of The New Pornographers
- Kvitka Cisyk – soprano singer
- Andrij Dobriansky – bass-baritone, had the longest career with the Metropolitan Opera of any Ukrainian-born artist
- Stanley Drucker – orchestra clarinetist associated with Buffalo Philharmonic Orchestra and New York Philharmonic
- Yelena Dudochkin – soprano
- Bob Dylan – singer-songwriter, poet; his Jewish paternal grandparents emigrated from Odessa in the Russian Empire (now Ukraine) to the United States following the anti-Semitic pogroms of 1905
- Jackie Evancho – classical crossover singer
- Bill Evans – jazz musician and composer
- Anthony Fedorov – singer, finalist on season 4 of American Idol
- G-Eazy – songwriter-rapper
- Stan Getz - jazz saxophonist and band leader, popularizer of cool and bossa nova sub-genres
- Vladimir Horowitz – Jewish Ukrainian pianist; widely regarded as one of the most successful pianists of the 20th century
- George Hrab – drummer, singer-songwriter and podcaster; often discusses his Ukrainian heritage on his podcast
- Eugene Hütz – musician and actor; lead singer of Gogol Bordello
- George Komsky – solo vocalist
- Lenny Kravitz – singer, instrumentalist; the family of his father Sy Kravitz has Ukrainian roots
- Julian Kytasty – bandurist, traditional Ukrainian music
- Valentina Lisitsa – Ukrainian-born pianist
- Matys Brothers – rockabilly musical act
- Nathan Milstein – Jewish Ukrainian-born American virtuoso violinist
- Peter Ostroushko – violinist and mandolinist
- Wally Palmar – musician of The Romantics
- Paul Plishka – opera singer
- Vyacheslav Polozov – opera singer
- Johnny Ramone – musician
- Sviatoslav Richter – German Ukrainian pianist; widely regarded as one of the most successful pianists of the 20th century
- Sam H. Stept – Broadway/Hollywood/big band composer based in America but born in Odessa in 1897
- Dorian Rudnytsky – cellist and composer; son of Maria Sokil; father is Ukrainian
- Melanie Safka – folk singer, performed at Woodstock
- Nicole Scherzinger – pop singer-songwriter, member of The Pussycat Dolls and television music competition judge; of Ukrainian descent on her mother's side
- Christine Shevchenko – Ukrainian-born ballerina
- Dee Snider – musician, frontman for Twisted Sister
- Maria Sokil – soprano singer
- Dimitri Tiomkin – film composer
- Steven Tyler – singer-songwriter, frontman for Aerosmith
- Bruno Mars- singer-songwriter
- Peter Wilhousky – composer, educator and conductor
- Your Old Droog – rapper

== Performers ==
- Vasyl Avramenko – dancer, choreographer
- David Copperfield – illusionist/magician, of Jewish descent
- Maksim Chmerkovskiy – dancer and choreographer, known for Dancing with the Stars
- Valentin Chmerkovskiy – dancer and choreographer, known for Dancing with the Stars
- Serge Lifar – dancer, choreographer, director, writer, dance theoretician
- Roma Prima-Bohachevsky – dancer, choreographer and dancer instructor
- Karina Smirnoff – dancer and choreographer, known for Dancing with the Stars
- Christine Shevchenko – ballet dancer
- Igor Youskevitch – ballet dancer

== Politicians ==
- Mary Beck – former Detroit councilwoman and acting Mayor
- Lex Berezhny – member of the New Hampshire House of Representatives
- David E Bonior – former Michigan Congressman and Minority House Whip
- Walter Dudycz – former Illinois State Senator
- Eliot Engel – New York Congressman
- Mike Enzi – US Senator from Wyoming
- Maurice Hinchey – former New York Congressman (Ukrainian mother)
- Martin Howrylak – Michigan State House of Representatives
- Stephen J Jarema – former New York State Assemblyman
- Gary Johnson – former Governor of New Mexico
- Ben Klassen – Republican state legislator, white supremacist, and religious leader
- Nick Kotik – former Pennsylvania State House of Representatives
- Kathy Kozachenko – former councilwoman Ann Arbor, Michigan
- Myron Kulas – former Illinois State Assemblyman
- Chris Lilik – political activist
- Lesia Liss – former Michigan State House of Representatives
- Michael Luchkovich – Canada's first Member of Parliament of Ukrainian origin (born in Shamokin, Pennsylvania)
- Stephen A. Mikulak – former New Jersey State Assemblyman
- Steven Pankow – former Mayor of Buffalo, New York
- JB Pritzker - Governor of Illinois
- Kirill Reznik – former Maryland State Delegates
- Bob Schaffer – former Colorado Congressman
- Chuck Schumer – senior US senator from New York
- John Shostak – former Connecticut State House of Representative
- Victoria Spartz – Indiana Congresswoman and former Indiana State Senator
- Arlen Spector – former US Senator from Pennsylvania
- Ted Stuban – former Pennsylvania State House of Representatives
- Mark Treyger – New York City Councilman
- Herman Toll – former Pennsylvania Congressman
- Inna Vernikov – New York City Councilor
- Eugene Vindman – Virginia Congressman
- Paul Wellstone – former US Senator from Minnesota
- Kathleen Willey – major figure in the Monica Lewinsky and Paula Jones scandals; her father was of Ukrainian descent

== Religious figures ==
- Paul Copan – Christian theologian, analytic philosopher, apologist, author; President of the Evangelical Philosophical Society
- Sergey F. Dezhnyuk—theologian, historian, and political analyst.
- Jim Cymbala – pastor for over 25 years of the 10,000-member Brooklyn Tabernacle church in New York City
- Borys Gudziak – reverend and archeparch
- Agapius Honcharenko – exiled Orthodox priest
- Anton LaVey – author of the Satanic bible
- Ivan Volansky – priest who organized the first Greek Catholic parish in the United States

== Sports figures ==
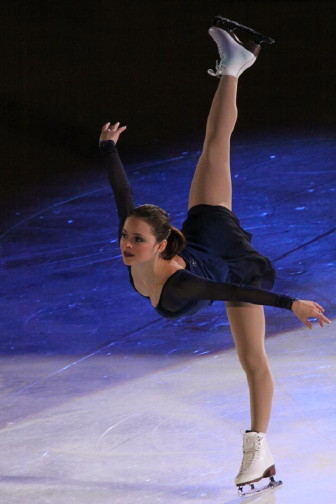
Sasha Cohen

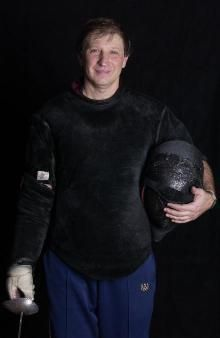
Yury Gelman

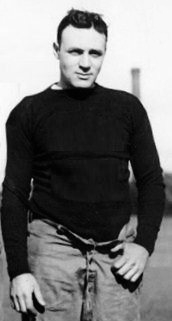
Ralph Horween

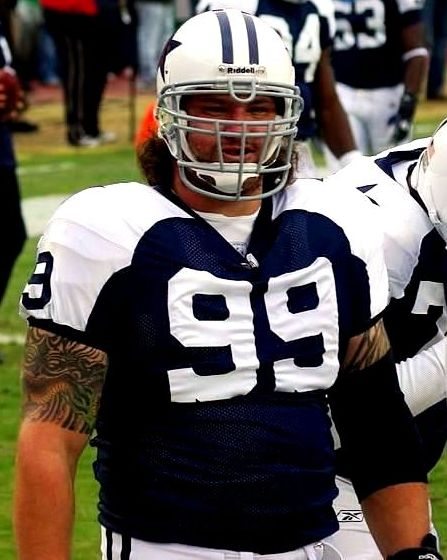
Igor Olshansky

- Oksana Baiul - Figure skater, 1994 Olympic Gold Medalist
- Orest Banach – German-born soccer goalkeeper
- Moe Berg – Major League Baseball catcher and coach
- Joel Bolomboy – NBA basketball player
- Ivan Borodiak – Argentine-born soccer player
- Sasha Chmelevski – NHL ice hockey player
- Wayne Chrebet – NFL football player
- Jakob Chychrun – NHL hockey player
- Nestor Chylak – Major League Baseball umpire; member of National Baseball Hall of Fame
- Gene Chyzowych – US National Soccer Team Coach and member of the National Soccer Coaches Association of America's Hall of Fame
- Walt Chyzowych – US National Soccer Team Coach and member of the National Soccer Coaches Association of America's Hall of Fame
- Sasha Cohen – Olympic silver medalist figure skater; Ukrainian Jewish on the maternal side
- Bill Cristall – Major League Baseball player
- Mike Ditka – NFL football player and coach; member of the Football Hall of Fame
- Jim Drucker (born 1952/1953) – former Commissioner of the Continental Basketball Association, former Commissioner of the Arena Football League, and founder of NewKadia Comics
- Pete Emelianchik – NFL football player
- Harry Fanok – Major League Baseball pitcher
- Ruslan Fedotenko – Ukrainian-born NHL ice hockey player, US citizen
- Jim Furyk – professional golfer
- Yury Gelman (born 1955) – Ukrainian-born American Olympic fencing coach
- Sam Gerson – Ukrainian-born Olympic wrestler
- Sloko Gill – NFL football player
- Charles Goldenberg (1911–1986) – All-Pro NFL player
- Alison Gregorka – Olympic water polo player
- Wayne Gretzky – NHL ice hockey player of Ukrainian descent; US-Canadian dual citizen
- Stephen Halaiko – professional boxer
- Arnold Horween – NFL football player, of Jewish descent
- Ralph Horween – NFL football player, of Jewish descent
- Nick Itkin – Olympic bronze medalist fencer
- Chris Jericho – AEW professional wrestler and frontman for Fozzy, mother is of Ukrainian descent
- Kid Kaplan – boxer
- Paul Konerko – Major League Baseball player
- Steve Konowalchuk – NHL ice hockey player
- Mike Kostiuk – NFL football player
- Dima Kovalenko – Ukrainian-born American soccer player
- Lenny Krayzelburg – Ukrainian-born Olympic swimmer
- Matt Kuchar – professional golfer
- Bob Kudelski – NHL ice hockey player
- Denis Kudla – Ukrainian-born professional tennis player
- Kyle Kuzma – NBA basketball player
- Varvara Lepchenko – professional tennis player
- Terry Liskevych – US Olympics Volleyball coach
- Evan Longoria – Major League Baseball third baseman for the Tampa Bay Rays; of Ukrainian descent on maternal side
- Daphne Martschenko – professional rower; Ukrainian father
- Steve Melnyk – professional golfer
- Charlie Metro – Major League Baseball player
- Bronko Nagurski – NFL football player and professional wrestler; member of Football Hall of Fame
- Bronko Nagurski Jr. – Canadian football player
- Igor Olshansky – NFL football defensive end for the Miami Dolphins; born in Dnipropetrovsk, Ukraine
- Greg Pateryn – NHL ice hockey player
- Oleg Prudius – WWE professional wrestler known as "Vladimir Kozlov"
- Steve Romanik – NFL football player
- Dmitry Salita – Ukrainian-born American boxer; also called "Star of David"
- Richard Sandrak – child bodybuilder
- Flip Saunders – head coach for Detroit Pistons and coaches in the NBA
- Richie Scheinblum – Major League Baseball All Star outfielder, of Jewish descent
- Andy Seminick – Major League Baseball player
- Art Shamsky (born 1941) – Major League Baseball outfielder and Israel Baseball League manager, of Jewish descent
- Mike Souchak – professional golfer
- Eugene Starikov – Ukrainian-born American soccer player
- Wally Szczerbiak – NBA basketball player
- Elizabeth Tartakovsky – fencer
- Brady Tkachuk – NHL player, son of Keith Tkachuk; Ukrainian descent on both sides
- Keith Tkachuk – NHL ice hockey player of Ukrainian descent; US-born citizen
- Matthew Tkachuk – NHL player, son of Keith Tkachuk; Ukrainian descent on both sides
- Phil Weintraub (1907–1987) – Major League Baseball first baseman & outfielder
- Chuck Wepner – professional boxer
- George Varoff – pole vaulter and former World Record holder
- Ed Vargo – Major League Baseball umpire
- Nikolai Volkoff – WWF professional wrestler
- Smokey Yunick – NASCAR mechanic and car designer

== Scientists and scholars ==
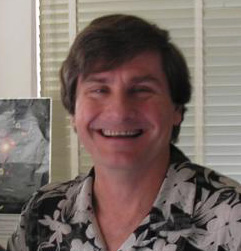
Alexei Filippenko

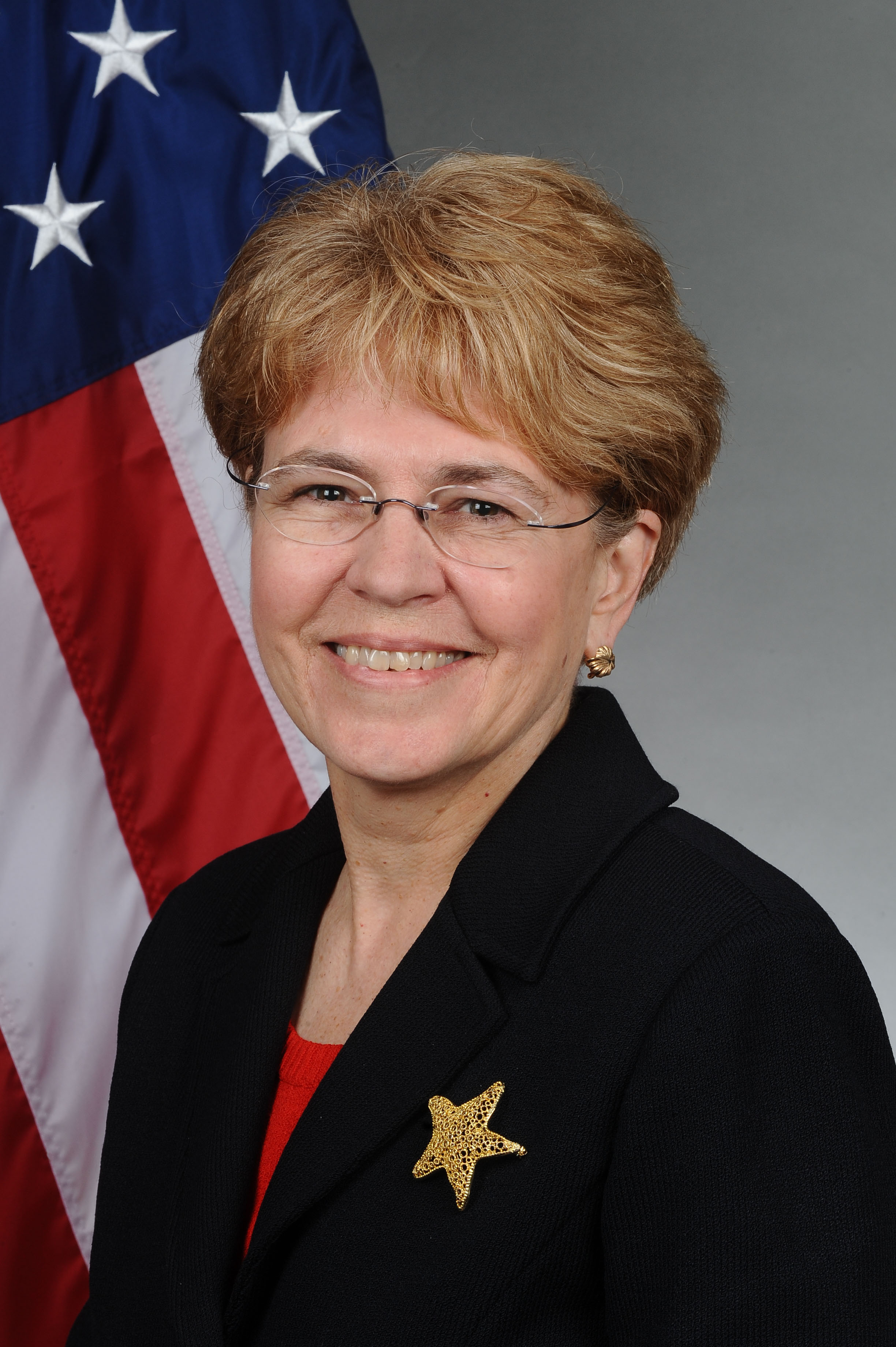
Jane Lubchenco

Gregory Mankiw

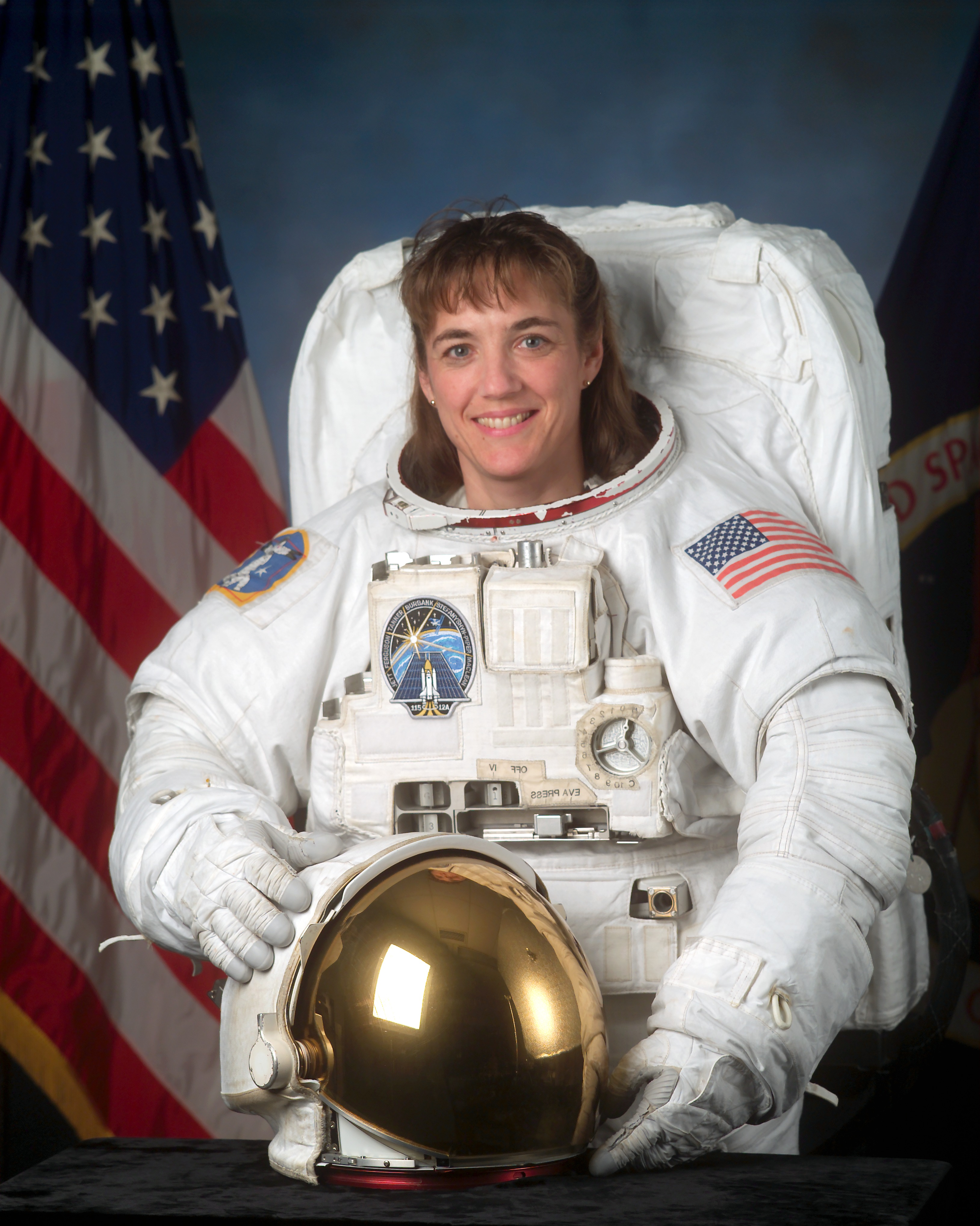
Heidemarie Stefanyshyn-Piper

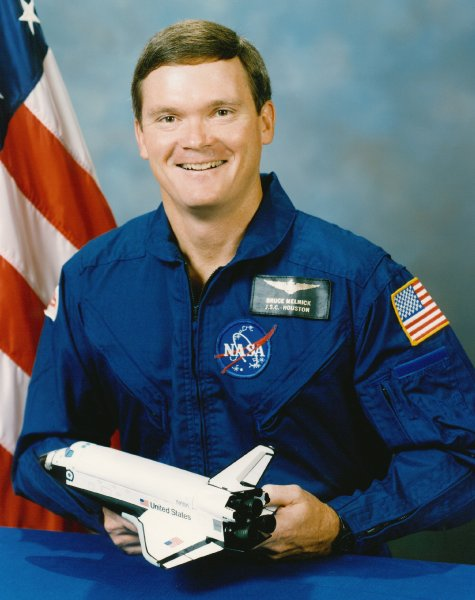
Bruce E. Melnick, NASA astronaut and United States Coast Guard officer

- Gabriel Almond – professor of political science; founder of Princeton University's, Center of International Studies
- Lev Dobriansky – professor of economics at Georgetown University; U.S. ambassador to the Bahamas; anti-communist advocate; known for work with the National Captive Nations Committee, which he initiated during the Eisenhower administration, and the Victims of Communism Memorial Foundation, where he served as a chairman
- Theodosius Dobzhansky – geneticist and evolutionary biologist
- Katherine Esau – botanist
- Alexei Filippenko – astrophysicist and professor of astronomy at the University of California, Berkeley; developed and runs the Katzman Automatic Imaging Telescope; ranked as the most cited researcher in space science 1996–2006; won the 2006 US Professor of the Year Award; elected to the National Academy of Sciences in 2009; frequently featured on the History Channel series The Universe
- Maria Fischer-Slyzh - doctor of pediatrics, philanthropist
- Maxwell Finland – scientist, medical researcher, an expert on infectious diseases
- Konstantin Frank – viticulturist and winemaker, responsible for developing the thriving viticulture and wine industry of New York State, using his experience of growing the Southern European Vitis vinifera varietals in the colder climate of Ukraine
- Milton Friedman – economist
- John-Paul Himka – professor of Ukrainian history
- Taras Hunczak – historian (Ph.D., professor) and media adviser; expert in East European history and languages
- Roman Jackiw – MIT professor of physics
- John Kanzius – inventor and radio/TV engineer
- George Kistiakowsky – physical chemistry professor, member of the Manhattan Project
- Lubomyr Kuzmak – pioneer within the bariatric surgery community, invented the adjustable gastric band
- Max Levchin – computer scientist and internet entrepreneur; co-founder (along with Peter Thiel and Elon Musk) and former chief technology officer of PayPal; founded a number of other technology companies, of Jewish descent.
- Jane Lubchenco – environmental scientist and marine ecologist, head of the National Oceanic and Atmospheric Administration
- Sonja Lyubomirsky – professor in the department of psychology at the University of California, Riverside researching positive psychology and happiness, an associate editor of the Journal of Positive Psychology, and the author of The How of Happiness, a book of happiness strategies backed by scientific research
- Boris Magasanik – microbiologist and biochemist
- Greg Mankiw – macroeconomist; chairman and professor of economics at Harvard University; known in academia for his work on New Keynesian economics and publishing the best-selling economics textbook Principles of Economics; chairman 2003-2005 of the Council of Economic Advisers under President George W. Bush; his was ranked the number one economics blog by US economics professors in a 2011 survey; elected a member of the American Academy of Arts and Sciences in 2007; with David Card, was elected vice president of the American Economic Association for 2014
- Bruce E. Melnick – Commander, USCG and NASA Astronaut
- Michael I. Mishchenko – senior scientist at Goddard Institute for Space Studies
- Jeffrey Miron – economist and outspoken libertarian; chairman of the department of economics at Boston University 1992–1998; currently senior lecturer and director of undergraduate studies at Harvard University's Economics Department
- Alexander J. Motyl – historian, professor of political science at Rutgers University
- Anna Nagurney – mathematician, economist, educator and author in the field of Operations Management; holds the John F. Smith Memorial Professorship in the Isenberg School of Management at the University of Massachusetts Amherst
- Sherwin B. Nuland – scholar and author, father of Victoria Nuland
- Simon Ramo – physicist; Russian–Ukrainian
- Heidemarie Stefanyshyn-Piper – Captain, USN and NASA astronaut
- George Shevelov – professor; Ukrainian linguist
- Frank Sysyn – professor of Ukrainian history
- Roman Szporluk – historian and political scientist; former director of the Harvard Ukrainian Research Institute
- Sergiy Vilkomir – computer scientist; associate professor at East Carolina University
- Eugene Volokh – law professor, the Gary T. Schwartz Professor of Law at the UCLA School of Law; an academic affiliate of the law firm Mayer Brown; publishes the blog "The Volokh Conspiracy"
- Michael J. Yaremchuk – plastic surgeon
- Michael I. Yarymovych – Chief Scientist of the US Air Force and NASA Scientist
- Arnold Zellner – economist; statistician

== Writers and journalists ==
- Sy Bartlett – screenwriter and motion picture producer
- Kiran Chetry – former CNN anchor
- Jerry Cooke – photojournalist
- Maryna and Serhiy Dyachenko – Ukrainian fantasy fiction writers residing in the United States
- Richard Ellmann – literary critic and biographer
- Hedwig Gorski - poet and author; mother born in Ukraine
- Adrian Holovaty – journalist
- Olena Kalytiak Davis – poet
- Maria Kuznetsova – novelist
- Mariya Livytska – writer
- Lera Loeb – writer
- Valya Dudycz Lupescu – writer
- Dzvinia Orlowsky – poet, translator and professor
- Evanka Osmak – sports anchor
- Chuck Palahniuk – transgressive fiction novelist and freelance journalist
- Anna Politkovskaya – journalist, writer
- Margot Roosevelt – journalist
- Mike Royko – journalist (Ukrainian father)
- Michael Smerconish – CNN host
- Yuriy Tarnawsky – writer and linguist
- Neale Donald Walsch – author

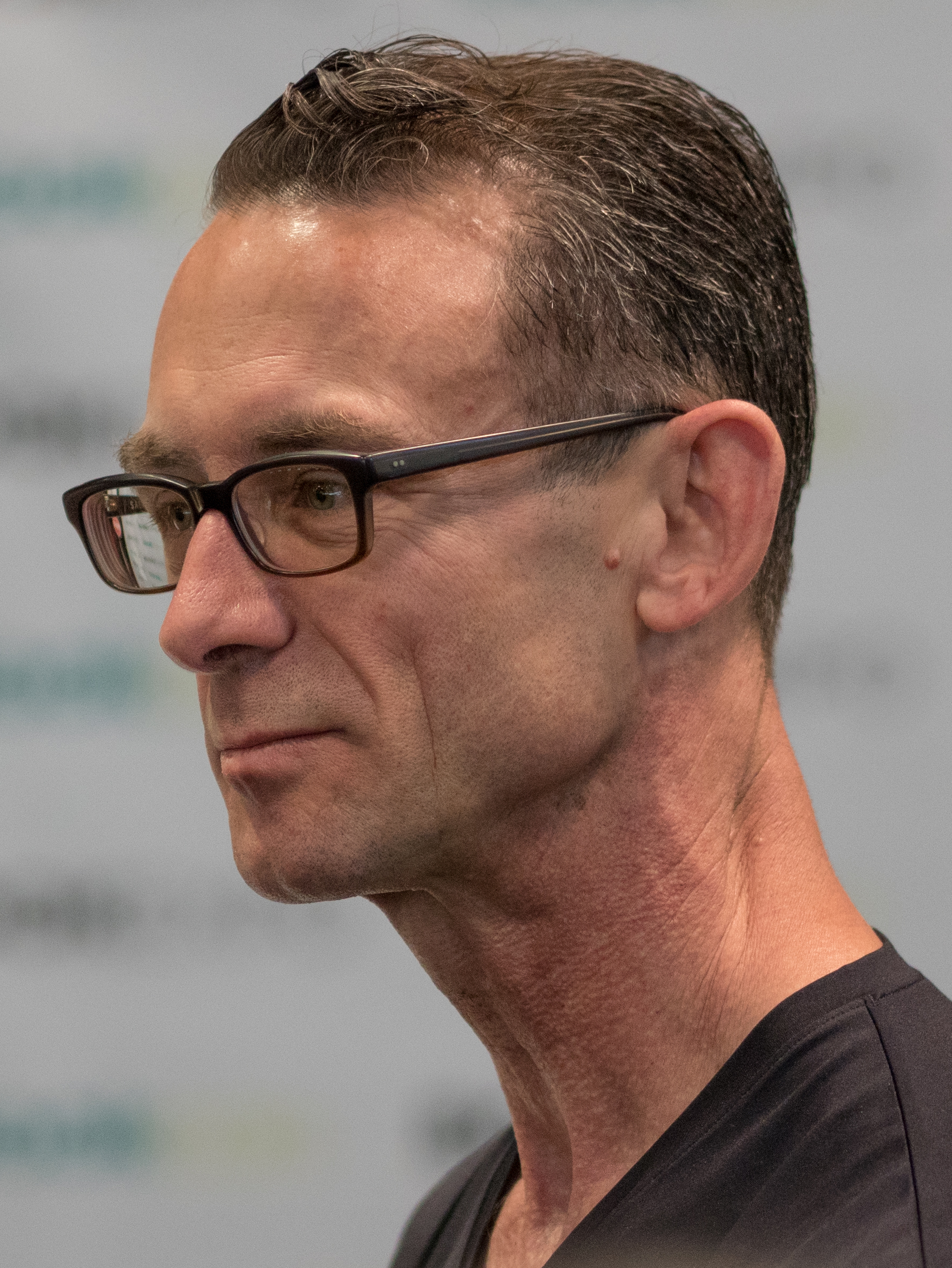
Chuck Palahniuk, an American freelance journalist and novelist of Ukrainian descent.

== Other ==
- Vitaly Borker – Internet criminal and cyberbully
- John Demjanjuk – retired auto worker/war crimes defendant
- Sky Metalwala – Seattle-area child missing since 2011; born to a Ukrainian immigrant mother.
- Semion Mogilevich – alleged "boss of bosses" of most Russian Mafia syndicates
- Jackie Stallone – astrologer and mother of Sylvester Stallone, maternal Jewish descent
- James J. Maksimuk – CEO, CWF Flooring, Inc. of Palmdale, California, USA

== See also ==
- List of Ukrainian Canadians
