= Yaremchuk =

Yaremchuk, also spelled Iaremchuk, is a Ukrainian surname. Notable people with the surname include:

- Aleksandr Iaremchuk (born 1995), Russian Paralympian
- Gary Yaremchuk (born 1961), Canadian ice hockey player
- Ivan Yaremchuk (born 1962), Soviet and Ukrainian footballer
- Ken Yaremchuk (born 1964), Canadian ice hockey player
- Mariya Yaremchuk (born 1993), Ukrainian singer
- Michael J. Yaremchuk, American medical doctor
- Nazariy Yaremchuk (1951–1995), Ukrainian singer
- Roman Yaremchuk (born 1995), Ukrainian footballer
- Sofiia Yaremchuk (born 1994), Ukrainian long-distance runner
- Viktor Iaremchuk (born 1991), Ukrainian gymnast
