= Ukrainian American Veterans =

American non-profit organization

- Seal of the Ukrainian American Veterans
- Abbreviation: UAV
- Formation: May 29, 1948
- Type: NGO
- Legal status: Association
- Purpose: Veterans service organization
- Members: individual
- National commander: Michael Hrycak
- Main organ: National Executive Board
- Affiliations: UAV Ladies Auxiliary
- Website: https://www.uavets.org/

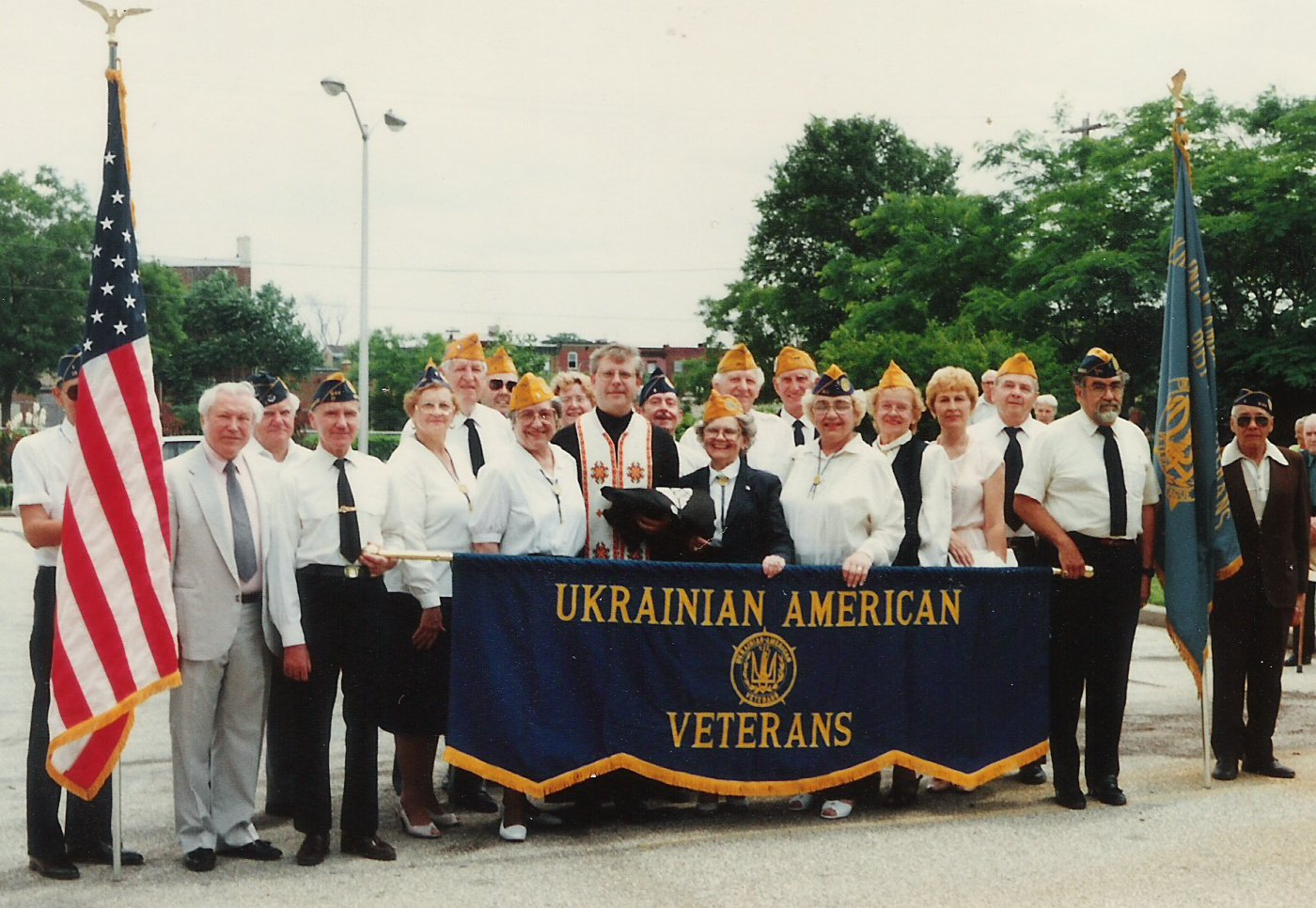
Ukrainian American Veterans gather after raising a POW-MIA Flag in Philadelphia, Pa.

The Ukrainian American Veterans (UAV, Ukrainian: Українські Американські Ветерани, romanized: Ukrainski Amerykanski Veterany) is a 501(c)(19) non-profit organization of the United States, composed of Honorably Discharged Veterans of the United States Armed Forces, who are of Ukrainian heritage or descent. The UAV obtained its tax-exempt status from the IRS in 1984 and was incorporated in the State of New York in 1987. The organization is governed by a volunteer National Executive Board (NEB), headed by a National Commander, elected at a National Convention.

Fifty-five delegates attended the first National Convention, from such cities as Bayonne, N.J., Clifton, N.J., Newark, N.J., New York City, N.Y., Perth Amboy, N.J., Philadelphia, Pa., Rome, N.Y., and Troy, N.Y. The delegates discussed variations on a name for the group, and settled on Ukrainian American Veterans. Various resolutions were adopted and officials elected, and it was decided that subsequent conventions would be held on an annual basis.

== Organizational structure ==
=== Posts ===
The Post is the basic unit of the UAV and usually represents a local geographic area such as a metropolitan area, city, town, or county. The Post is used for formal business such as meetings and a coordination point for local projects. Often the Post will host community events such as bingo, breakfasts, and holiday celebrations. It is also not uncommon for the Post to contain a bar open during limited hours. A Post member is distinguished by a navy blue garrison cap with gold lettering and gold piping.

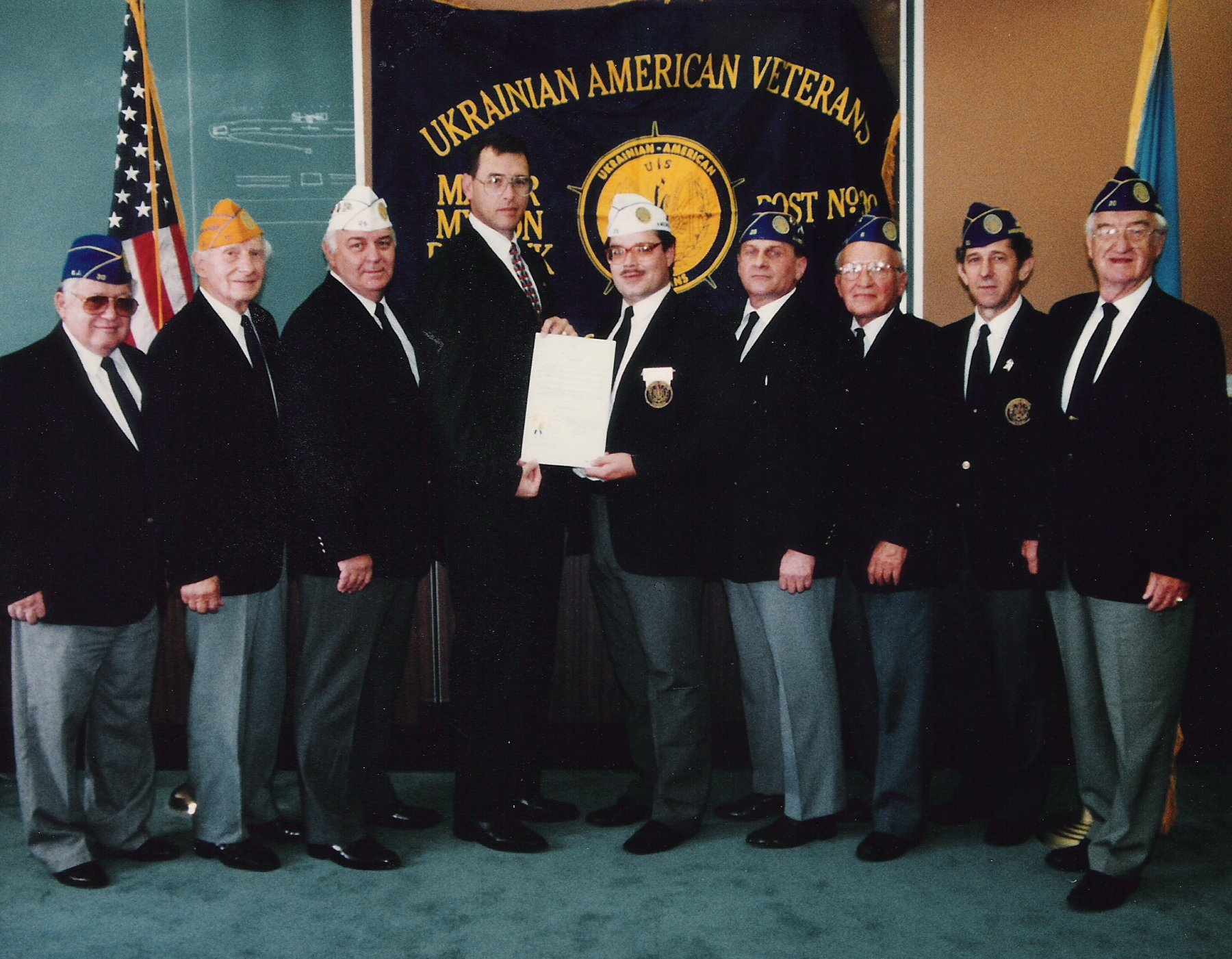
Members of the UAV New Jersey State Dept. mark Ukrainian Independence Day

=== State departments ===
The Posts are grouped together into a state level organization known as a State Department for the purposes of coordination and administration. There can be a total of 51 State Departments; one for each of the 50 states, and the District of Columbia. A State Department Commander or Department Board Officer is distinguished by a white garrison cap with blue lettering and blue piping.

=== National Executive Board ===
The authority of the Ukrainian American Veterans is vested in the National Executive Board (NEB), which meets quarterly or as needed, to conduct the business of the organization. The NEB is headed by a National Commander, who presides over meetings. Other NEB officers may include

- Vice Commander
- Adjutant
- Judge Advocate
- Finance Officer
- Quartermaster
- Chaplain
- Historian
- Public Relations Officer
- National Registry Officer
- Scholarship Officer
- Webmaster

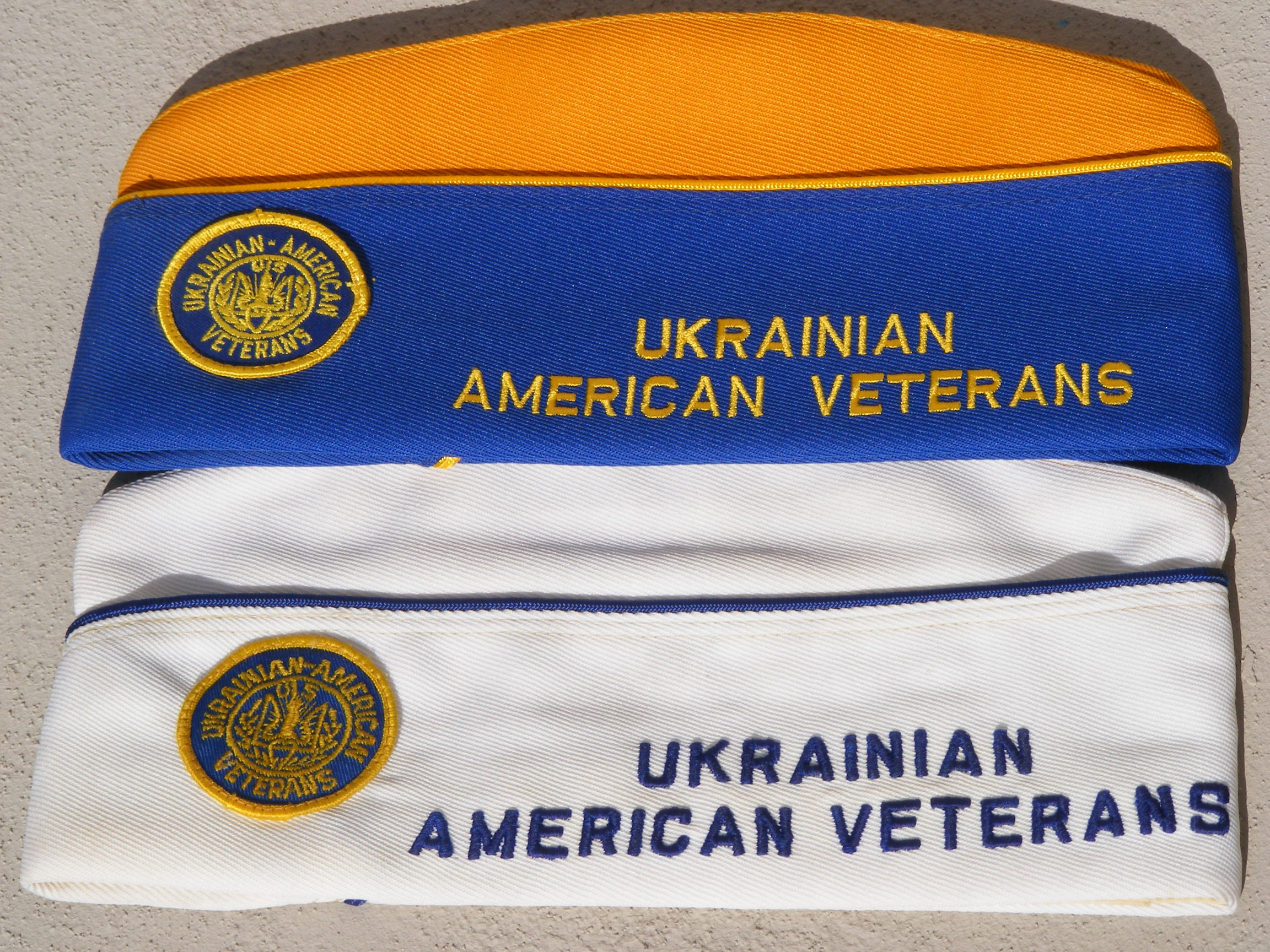
Garrison caps used by the Ukrainian American Veterans. The Blue and Gold hat is worn by National Executive Board Officers, while the white cap is used by State Department Officers.

A National Commander is distinguished by a gold garrison cap with blue lettering and blue piping. An Officer of the National Executive Board is distinguished by a garrison cap with a blue crown and gold peak, gold lettering and gold piping.

=== Ladies Auxiliary ===
A Ladies Auxiliary to the Ukrainian American Veterans has been established. The Ukrainian American Veterans Ladies Auxiliary is a U.S.-headquartered patriotic service organization for women interested in voluntary service. It is a non-profit organization, affiliated with The Ukrainian American Veterans.

Although individual Ladies Auxiliary units existed alongside UAV Posts prior to the 1948 Convention, a National organization did not materialize until March, 1974. Rosalie Polche was elected temporary President to lead the group at that time. At the 27th UAV National Convention, in June 1974, at Jersey City, N.J., the Ladies Auxiliary was officially recognized as a part of the Ukrainian American Veterans organization. A Constitution and By-Laws was adopted the following year, in June 1975, at the National Convention in Spring Valley, N.Y.

The Ukrainian American Veterans Ladies Auxiliary is an organization with dedicated, empowered women across the country, who are devoted to America's veterans, children and youth, with the notion of inspiring Auxiliary members' communities.

== Activities ==
=== Patriotic Activities ===
The Ukrainian American Veterans organize and participate in various patriotic ceremonies, including: Armed Forces Day, Memorial Day, Independence Day, Veterans Day, and others. These are usually hosted at the Post level. The ceremonies may include visitation to cemeteries and marching in parades. Many individual UAV Posts have placed memorial markers or monuments in a cemetery that is centrally located for them. These monuments are the gathering place for members during Memorial Day and Veterans Day services.

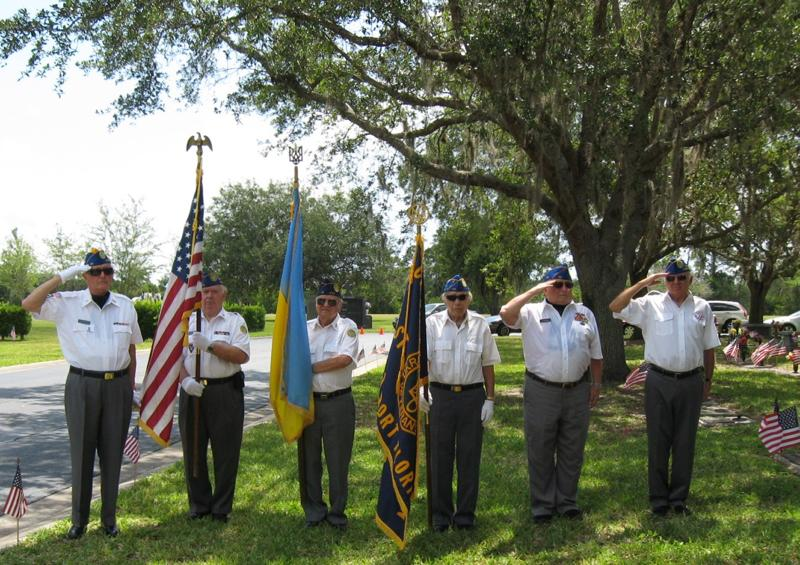
Members of UAV Florida Post 40 mark Memorial Day

Many Posts also commemorate Ukrainian Independence Day as a holiday, which was observed on January 22 in the past. After 1991, the date of observance was changed to August 24.

Representatives of UAV State Departments often participate in patriotic ceremonies, such as Proclamation signings that are sponsored by the Governor's Office or Resolution readings that are passed by the State Legislature. State Department Officers are also frequently invited to attend an annual "Governor's Review" of the State's National Guard troops.

At the National level, the UAV participated in a ceremony in Washington, D.C., on June 27, 1964, at the dedication of the Taras Shevchenko statue. Former President Dwight D. Eisenhower was present as the keynote speaker.

The UAV participated and marched in a parade in Washington, D.C., on June 24, 1976, to mark the Bicentennial of American Independence, sponsored by the Ukrainian Bicentennial Committee. A few days later, on June 27, 1976, the Ukrainian American Veterans, along with representatives of the Veterans of the First Division of the Ukrainian National Army, laid a wreath at the Tomb of the Unknown Soldier at Arlington National Cemetery. The wreath laying was preceded by a memorial service (Moleben), which was conducted jointly by Metropolitan Mstyslav Skrypnyk of the Ukrainian Orthodox Church of the USA, and Bishop Basil Losten of the Ukrainian Catholic Church. UAV National Commander Harry Polche was quoted during the ceremony:

We stand here with pride and reverence, and we pause a moment to remember all the brave men who gave their lives for this country throughout its history. They paid the supreme sacrifice for freedom, for human dignity, for everyone's hopes and dreams and rights, above all, for peace in the world. We pray that the world will achieve that peace soon.

The UAV has placed a Memorial Plaque at the USS Arizona Memorial in Pearl Harbor, Honolulu, Hawaii. Past National Commander Bohdan Bezkorowajny, accompanied by his wife Anne of the UAV Ladies Auxiliary and Past National Commander Walter Bacad, presented the plaque to the U.S. Navy in 1980. The UAV has also placed a Memorial Plaque at Arlington National Cemetery, near Washington, D.C. An additional Marker was placed at Fort Custer National Cemetery in Michigan, in 1996.

==== National Monument ====
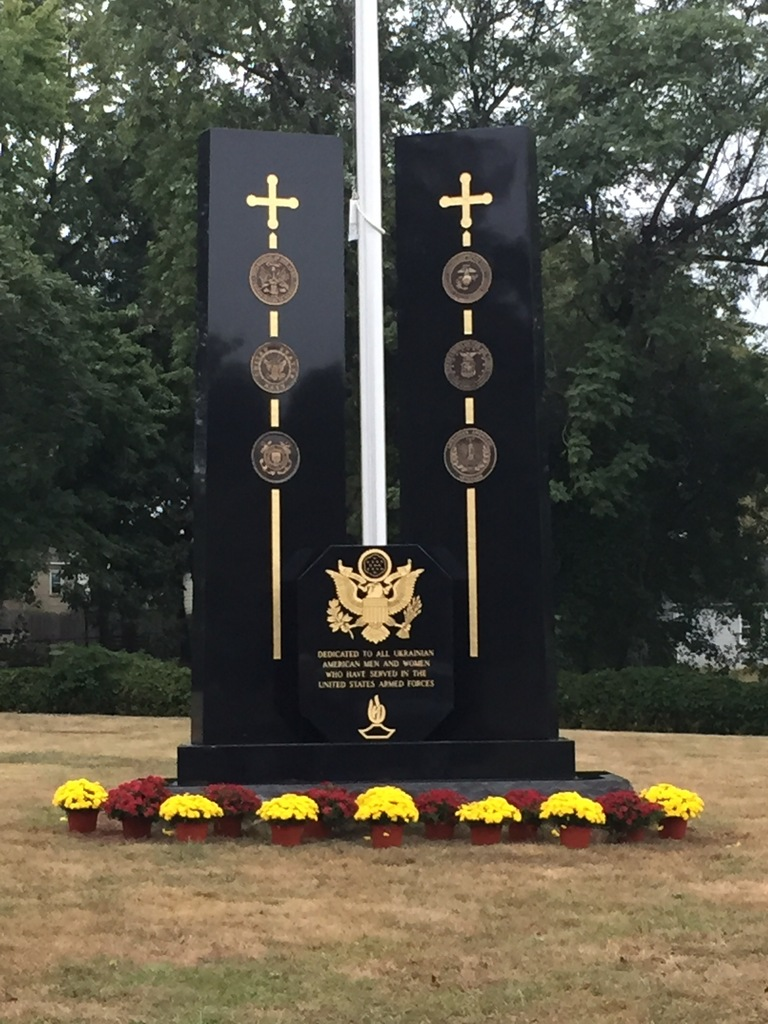
UAV national monument consisting of two black marble columns, each containing three emblems of the six US armed services

In 2005, National Commander Anna Krawczuk announced that a UAV National Monument would be built at St. Andrew's Ukrainian Orthodox Cemetery, in South Bound Brook, New Jersey. The UAV Monument would be an ideal gathering place on St. Thomas Sunday and other holidays, to remember all Ukrainian American Veterans. The monument was formally unveiled on 3 October 2015. The inscription reads "DEDICATED TO ALL UKRAINIAN AMERICAN MEN AND WOMEN WHO HAVE SERVED IN THE UNITED STATES ARMED FORCES."

=== Charity ===
Since the creation of the Ukrainian American Veterans, one of the main activities of the group has been to work on charitable projects, such as the Welfare Fund, Scholarship Fund, and sending aid to Ukraine.

==== Welfare Fund ====
After the National UAV was established, there was a desire among the membership to have a "National Welfare Fund" to assist veterans in need.

This fund provides grants to veterans who underwent major surgery, had a prolonged stay in the hospital, and were in dire need of funds. An annual fund drive is conducted by the National Welfare Officer to replenish the Welfare Fund. Post Commanders apply for a Welfare Fund grant or loan on behalf of a post member. Neither a Post Commander nor the National Welfare Officer is permitted to disclose the name of the applicant.

==== Scholarship Fund ====
The 48th National Convention authorized the creation of a National Scholarship Fund and the election of a Scholarship Officer to the National Executive Board. The Scholarship Officer conducts an annual fund drive to replenish the scholarship fund, and selects a Scholarship Committee which reviews applications and awards scholarships.

==== Aid to Ukraine ====
After Ukraine obtained its independence from the Soviet Union in 1991, sending aid to Ukraine became a new activity for the Ukrainian American Veterans.

Dr. Ihor Zachary of Ohio Post 24 may have been the earliest organizer of aid, when he worked with the Children of Chernobyl Relief Fund Committee in August 1992 to bring the world's largest aircraft, the AN-225 Mria, to Rickenbacker International Airport in Columbus, Ohio. The crew of the plane was on a mission to collect medicine and medical instruments for the children of Chornobyl.

In 1993, Robert Gulay of New Jersey Post 25 started the "Adopt a Hospital" project, with the assistance of NJ State Commander George A. Miziuk. The Adopt a Hospital Program involved contacting hospitals in the state, and asking them to donate their surplus medical equipment, which was then shipped to hospitals in Ukraine. Enthusiasm for the project was so great from members, that all of the posts in New Jersey participated, and the posts in surrounding states (Connecticut and New York) wanted to pitch in.

In 1993, National Commander Roman Rakowsky wrote to President Bill Clinton, voicing his concern about the U.S. Veterans Administration distribution of duplicate medical journals to Russia, but not other former Soviet republics. The result was, the U.S. Administration released duplicates of medical journals to Ohio Post 24, which shipped them to Ukraine.

From May 22 to June 1, 1995, the Armed Forces of the U.S. and Ukraine conducted joint peacekeeping exercises in the Lviv area, known as "Operation Peace Shield". The U.S. forces were assisted by Major General (ret.) Nicholas S. H. Krawciw, former commander of the 3rd Infantry Division (1987–1989), who not only translated but also acted as a facilitator between generals of both armies. About a dozen other Ukrainian-speaking military officers and NCOs accompanied the U.S. Forces as interpreters, including Spc. Yaro Rohowsky, Maj. Roman Golash, Spc. Bohdan Мак, Maj. Roman Hayda, Maj. Gregory Perchatsch, Capt. Lia Mastronardi, Spc. Peter Lysenko, Spc. Oleg Sopel, USAF Capt. Marta Galuga and others. Having fluent linguists was essential for this mission. Since January 1995, Lt. Col. Yaro Oryshkevych M.D., D.C. Air National Guard, has been building a database of fluent Ukrainian speakers in both the active and reserve components of all branches of the service. Overall, Operation Peace Shield had 17 Ukrainian speakers and 19 Russian speakers. Many of the Ukrainian-speaking personnel were also UAV members.

In 1999, Commander Taras Szczur of New York Post 301 organized and sent aid to different Ukrainian freight ships, which were stranded in New York Harbor. The Post sent hundreds of pounds of meat, rice and other provisions to the Mikhail Stenko in April and did the same for the Banner of October in August.

===== Aid to Ukraine Following the Russian Invasion of Ukraine =====
Following the illegal 2014 Russian annexation of Crimea and the start of the Russo-Ukrainian War, the UAV ramped up its humanitarian aid to Ukraine.

In 2018, UAV Post 32 in Chicago established a 501(c)(3) charitable Humanitarian Fund to raise funds for wounded Ukrainian soldiers requiring rehabilitation. They organized a fact-finding visit to Ukraine, and established a working relationship with the Lviv Military Hospital in Western Ukraine. They eventually raised more than $100,000 which they used to purchase ambulances and surgical equipment and ship it to Ukraine. In August 2021, UAV National Adjutant John Steciw and Immediate Past National Commander Peter Bencak traveled to Lviv, Ukraine to visit the Lviv Military Hospital, to see the equipment that was purchased with their fundraising efforts. The visit was delayed by a year due to the COVID Pandemic.

UAV Post 33 in New Haven established a separate 501(c)(3) organization in 2022, following the Russian invasion of Ukraine. Over the next two years, they collected humanitarian aid items, medical supplies and equipment worth over $7.2 million and shipped it to Ukraine. In 2024, they changed tactics. Rather than collect items in the United States and ship them to Ukraine, they would raise money to purchase medical equipment with a goal to raise $438,060 to purchase a 3D Printer for the Prosthetics Lab at the St. Panteleimon Hospital in Lviv. They also raised funds to purchase things like generators, drones, medicines, food, netting material, uniforms and gear for soldiers graduating from the Military Academy in Lviv and remodel vehicles to transport wounded soldiers from the battlefield to nearby medical facilities.

In February 2021, the UAV National Executive Board authorized the establishment of a national Humanitarian Fund, however it was not as successful as the fundraising efforts organized by individual UAV posts, so the initiative was terminated in 2024.

In 2025, UAV Post 31 in Boston purchased 20 portable solar generators for Ukrainian forces, with more on order. UAV Post 42 in Lehigh Valley also raised funds for generators. Each generator cost $2,400. Those of you that served in the Army or Marine Corps are familiar with loud diesel generators that emit a dangerous overhead signature. Solar powered generators are quiet and do not emit a heat signature. Generators are critical for powering drones and other equipment. The solar generators are manufactured by a company owned by UAV member-at-large Paul Shmotolokha.

=== Community Activities ===
UAV members have served in various roles as community representatives and leaders.

In 1978, New Jersey Governor Brendan Byrne signed Executive Order 65, which established the Ethnic Advisory Council in the state. In 1982, Governor Tom Kean appointed Andrew Keybida of N.J. Post 17 as a Ukrainian representative and the first Ukrainian American Veteran member to serve on the Ethnic Advisory Council. Keybida would serve on the council for 10 years, well into the term of the next Governor, James J. Florio. In 1994, Governor Christine Todd-Whitman appointed George A. Miziuk of N.J. Post 25 as a Ukrainian representative on the Ethnic Advisory Council. Miziuk would serve for three years, until he moved to Florida and gave up the position.

In 1980, Pennsylvania Governor Dick Thornburgh established the Pennsylvania Heritage Affairs Advisory Commission, and appointed Past National Commander Walter "Tommy" Darmopray of Penna. Post 1 as a Ukrainian representative on the commission.

In 1991, New Jersey Commissioner of Veteran Affairs Dick Bernard (under Governor James J. Florio) invited State Commander George A. Miziuk to serve as an advisor to the N.J. State Vietnam Veterans Memorial Commission. Miziuk served for two years as an advisor. The New Jersey Vietnam Veterans Memorial was completed and unveiled in 1995. UAV N.J. Post 30 has a special marker dedicated to Major Myron F. Diduryk at the State Memorial.

In 1993, Past National Commander Roman Rakowsky of Ohio Post 24 served as a juror on a Cleveland Veterans committee to select a design for a memorial to be erected on Memorial Plaza, Cleveland Mall "A" for war casualties.

=== Social Activities ===
In addition to its formal activities, the UAV exists as a social group where members can share camaraderie with other American veterans of Ukrainian heritage. Social activities, mainly organized at the Post level, can vary anywhere from barbecues, baseball games, and bingo, to banquets and ballroom dances.

However, social contacts have also reached beyond the members of the UAV. In 1991, Ohio Post 24 and the Lviv-based Ukrainian Veterans of Afghanistan signed a “statement of understanding” to encourage a future relationship to exchange information.

== List of National Commanders ==
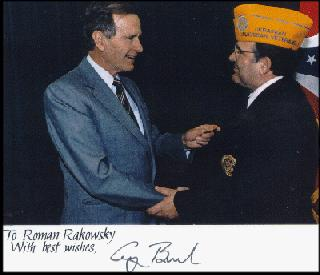
President George H.W. Bush met with National Commander Roman Rakowsky in 1992

National Commanders are elected for a term of one year, and may be reelected for additional terms.

- Michael Darmopray (Honorary), Pennsylvania, Post 1, 1948
- Michael Hynda, New Jersey, Post 6, 1948–1949
- Walter Shipka, New York, Post 7, 1949–1950
- Walter T. Darmopray, Pennsylvania, Post 1, 1950–1952
- Martin Horbiowski (Horby), Pennsylvania, Post 4, 1952–1953
- Walter T. Darmopray, Pennsylvania, Post 1, 1953–1954
- Alex Pronchik, Pennsylvania, Post 1, 1954–1956
- Walter Bacad, New York, Post 7, 1956–1957
- Emil Senkow, Pennsylvania, Post 4, 1957–1959
- George Wolynetz Jr., New York, Post 7, 1959–1960
- Anthony Kutcher, Connecticut, Post 14, 1960–1961
- Matthew J. Pope, New York, Post 7, 1961–1963
- Stephen Shegda, Pennsylvania, Post 4, 1963–1965
- Walter Klawsnick, New York, Post 7, 1965–1966
- Eugene Sagasz, New Jersey, Post 17, 1966–1968
- William Michael Dubetz, New York, Post 7, 1968–1970
- Michael Wengryn, New Jersey, Post 17, 1970–1972
- William Harrison, New York, Post 19, 1972–1973
- Emrick Prestash, Connecticut, Post 15, 1973–1974
- Vasyl Luchkiw, New York, Post 19, 1974–1976
- Harry Polche, New York, Post 7, 1976–1978
- Bohdan Bezkorowajny, New York, Post 7, 1978–1980
- Michael Chaika, Connecticut, Post 15, 1980–1982
- Edward A. Zetick, Pennsylvania, Post 4, 1982–1984
- Joseph Brega, New York, Post 19, 1984–1986

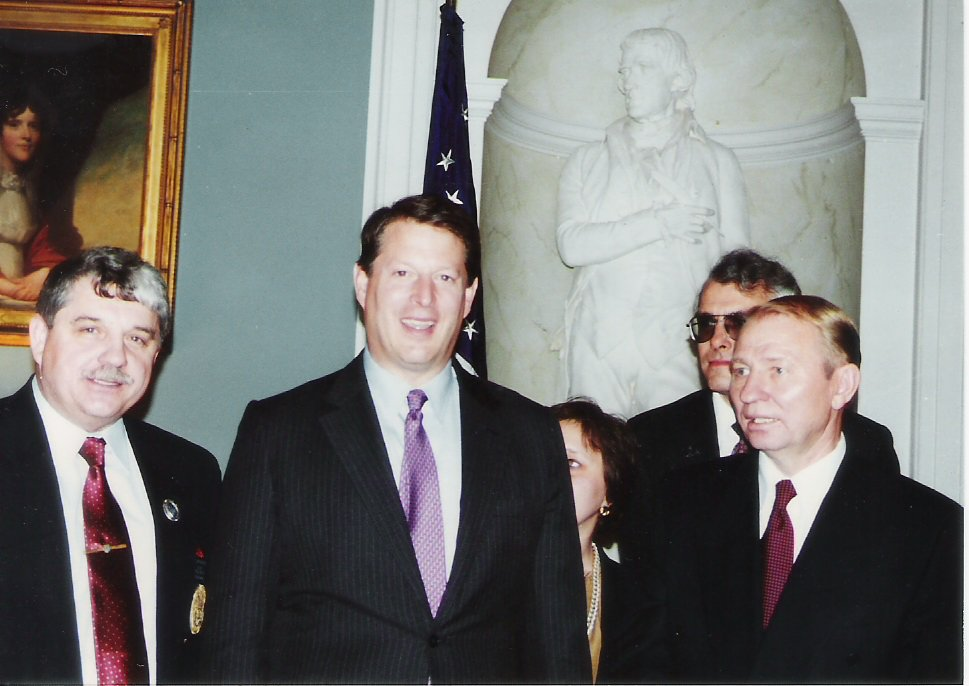
National Commander Malaniak (left) met with Vice Pres. Gore and Ukraine President Kuchma in 1994

- Atanas T. Kobryn, New York, Post 7, 1986–1988
- Jaroslaw Fodoryczuk, Pennsylvania, Post 18, 1988–1989
- Dmytro Bykovetz Jr., Pennsylvania, Post 4, 1989–1991
- Roman Rakowsky, Ohio, Post 24, 1991–1993
- Miroslaus Malaniak, New York, Post 23, 1993–1995
- Dmytro Bodnarczuk, New York, Post 19, 1995–1997
- Stephen Szewczuk, New York, Post 27, 1997–2000
- Mathew Koziak, New York, Post 27, 2000–2004
- Anna Krawczuk, New Jersey, Post 30, 2004–2008
- Leonid E. Kondratiuk, Massachusetts, Post 31, 2008–2012
- Ihor Hron, Florida, Post 40, 2012–2016
- Peter Bencak, Illinois, Post 32, 2016-2018
- Ihor Rudko, Connecticut, Post 33, 2018-2023
- Michael P. Hrycak, New Jersey, Post 17, 2023-present

== See also ==
- David E. Bonior
- Jeremy Michael Boorda
- Myron F. Diduryk
- Samuel Jaskilka
- Nicholas S. H. Krawciw
- Nicholas Minue
- Jack Palance
- Roman Popadiuk
- Michael Strank
