= Review of United States Human Space Flight Plans Committee =

NASA group established by the Obama administration to clarify US aerospace's future

- Logo of the Augustine Committee

Committee overview
- Formed: May 7, 2009; 17 years ago
- Dissolved: October 22, 2009; 17 years ago
- Committee executive: Norman R. Augustine, Chairman
- Parent agency: NASA
- Key document: Summary report

The Review of United States Human Space Flight Plans Committee, better known as the HSF Committee, Augustine Commission, or Augustine Committee, was a group convened by NASA at the request of the Office of Science and Technology Policy (OSTP), to review the nation's human spaceflight plans to ensure "a vigorous and sustainable path to achieving its boldest aspirations in space." The review was announced by the OSTP on May 7, 2009. It covered human spaceflight options after the time NASA had planned to retire the Space Shuttle. A summary report was provided to the OSTP director John Holdren, White House Office of Science and Technology Policy (OSTP), and NASA administrator on September 8, 2009. The estimated cost associated with the review was expected to be US$3 million. The committee was scheduled to be active for 180 days; the report was released on October 22, 2009.

== Objectives ==
The review was commissioned to take into account several objectives. These included support for the International Space Station, development of missions beyond low Earth orbit (including the Moon, Mars and near-Earth objects) and use of commercial space industry. These objectives must fit within a defined budget profile.

Among the parameters that were considered in the course of the review were "crew and mission safety, life-cycle costs, development time, national space industrial base impacts, potential to spur innovation and encourage competition, and the implications and impacts of transitioning from current human space flight systems". The review considered the appropriate amounts of research and development and "complementary robotic activity necessary to support various human space flight activities". It was tasked to also "explore options for extending International Space Station operations beyond 2016".

== Budget limits ==
The Statement of Task defines the fiscal year 2010–2014 budget profile (in millions of US$) for NASA's Exploration program as:

Year	2010	2011	2012	2013	2014
Budget	3,963.1	6,092.9	6,077.4	6,047.7	6,274.6

The fiscal year 2009 budget projection for Exploration had been:

Year	2010	2011	2012	2013
Budget	3,737.7	7,048.2	7,116.8	7,666.8

A subcommittee in the House of Representatives has announced a plan to cut the 2010 budget from US3,963.1 million to $3,293.2 million, a cut of $669.9 million or 16.9%. Chairman Alan Mollohan stated the cut was a "pause" and "time-out" caused by the review of human space flight.

== Findings ==
The Committee has concluded that, "the ultimate goal of human exploration is to chart a path for human expansion into the solar system." It also observed that "destinations should derive from goals," and "human spaceflight objectives should broadly align with key national objectives." Destinations beyond low Earth orbit that were considered by the Committee include the Moon, Mars, and near-Earth objects as well as the moons of Mars, Phobos and Deimos. Among these, the Committee felt that "Mars stands prominently above all other opportunities for exploration" because "if humans are ever to live for long periods on another planetary surface, it is likely to be on Mars."

The Committee's final report mentions the possibility of evaluating near-Earth objects for "their utility as sites for mining of in-situ resources."

The Committee judged the 9-year old Constellation program to be so behind schedule, underfunded and over budget that meeting any of its goals would not be possible. President Obama removed the program from the 2010 budget effectively canceling the program. One component of the program, the Orion crew capsule was added back to plans but as a rescue vehicle to complement the Russian Soyuz in returning Station crews to Earth in the event of an emergency.

The proposed "ultimate goal" for human space flight would appear to require two basic objectives: (1) physical sustainability and (2) economic sustainability. The Committee adds a third objective: to meet key national objectives. These might include international cooperation, developing new industries, energy independence, reducing climate change, national prestige, etc. Therefore, the ideal destination should contain resources such as water to sustain life (also providing oxygen for breathing, and hydrogen to combine with oxygen for rocket fuel), and precious and industrial metals and other resources that may be of value for space construction and perhaps in some cases worth returning to Earth (e.g., see asteroid mining).

Some of these resources are available on Mars, and perhaps on the Moon, but the Committee report noted the cost and difficulty of "travel into the deep gravity wells of the lunar and Martian surface." It did not emphasize options such as asteroid mining (other than the one mention noted above) or space-based solar power. The Committee report did favor strengthening the private space launch industry, and increased international collaboration.

In its final report, the Committee proposed three basic options for exploration beyond low Earth orbit, and appeared to favor the third option:

- Mars First, with a Mars landing, perhaps after a brief test of equipment and procedures on the Moon.
- Moon First, with lunar surface exploration focused on developing the capability to explore Mars.
- A Flexible Path to inner solar system locations, such as lunar orbit, Lagrange points, near-Earth objects and the moons of Mars, followed by exploration of the lunar surface and/or Martian surface, optionally involving the development of a propellant depot.

== Obama's choice for the future of the U.S. Program ==
The review aimed to "examine ongoing and planned National Aeronautics and Space Administration (NASA) development activities, as well as potential alternatives, and present options for advancing a safe, innovative, affordable, and sustainable human space flight program in the years following Space Shuttle retirement". The panel was to "work closely with NASA and will seek input" from the United States Congress, "the White House, the public, industry, and international partners as it develops its options". "It is to present its results in time to support an Administration decision on the way forward by August 2009."

On April 15, 2010, President Obama spoke at the Kennedy Space Center announcing the administration's plans for NASA. None of the three plans outlined in the Committees final report were completely selected. The President promised:

1. $6 billion in additional funding over five years
2. continued investment in private space to provide low Earth orbit access
3. continued funding for a solar atmosphere probe (became the Parker Solar Probe), further Mars robotic missions, and a follow-on orbital telescope (James Webb Space Telescope)
4. extend the life of the International Space Station to 2020, allowing it to be used for scientific research
5. design of a new heavy lift rocket to be ready to start construction in 2015, in order to launch astronauts and material for beyond-Earth-orbit access
6. crewed flights using the new launcher in the early 2020s
7. a crewed mission to an asteroid in the mid-2020s
8. crewed missions to Mars orbit by the mid-2030s.

Obama specifically rejected going back to the Moon, saying "frankly, we've been there." Instead he set a series of ever-more-challenging goals to drive technological development.

== Members ==
- Norman Augustine (chairman), former CEO of Lockheed Martin
- Wanda Austin, CEO of The Aerospace Corporation
- Bohdan Bejmuk, former Boeing manager
- Leroy Chiao, former NASA astronaut
- Christopher Chyba, Princeton University professor
- Edward F. Crawley, MIT professor
- Jeffrey Greason, co-founder of XCOR Aerospace
- Charles Kennel, former director of Scripps Institution of Oceanography
- Lester Lyles, former Air Force general
- Sally Ride, former NASA astronaut, 1st American woman in space

== Subgroups ==
The committee formed four work subgroups to examine different aspects of the committee's charter with each providing progress reports by July 2, 2009.

General Lyles, who also serves as Chairman of the National Academies Committee on the "Rationale and Goals of the U.S. Civil Space Program", led the International and Interagency Integration subgroup. That committee expected to release its final report July 31, 2009. The Shuttle and International Space Station subgroup was led by Dr. Ride. Mr. Bejmuk led the Access to Low Earth Orbit subgroup. And Professor Crawley leads the Exploration Beyond Low Earth Orbit subgroup.

In the committee's summary report provided to the White House and NASA on September 8, 2009, the panel concluded that human exploration beyond low-Earth orbit was not viable under the FY 2010 budget guideline.

== Meetings ==
Date	Type	Location
June 16, 2009	Preparatory Meeting, Non-Public	Washington, D.C.
June 17, 2009	Public Meeting	Carnegie Institution for Science, Washington, D.C.
June 18, 2009	Site Visit, Non-Public	Dulles, Virginia
June 24–25, 2009	Site Visit, Non-Public	Huntsville and Decatur, Alabama, and Michoud, Louisiana
July 8–9, 2009	Site Visit, Fact Finding Meetings, Non-Public	Hawthorne, Canoga Park and Sacramento, California
July 21–23, 2009	Fact Finding Meetings, Non-Public	Ogden, Utah and Las Vegas, Nevada
July 28, 2009	Public Meeting	League City, Texas
July 29, 2009	Public Meeting	Huntsville, Alabama
July 30, 2009	Public Meeting	Cocoa Beach, Florida
August 5, 2009	Public Meeting	Washington, D.C.
August 12, 2009	Public Meeting	Washington, D.C.
October 8, 2009	Public Teleconference	

== See also ==
- Commercial Orbital Transportation Services
- DIRECT
- Evolved Expendable Launch Vehicle
- Vision for Space Exploration
- Shuttle-Derived Heavy Lift Launch Vehicle
