= Muzhyliv =

Rural locality in Ternopil Oblast, Ukraine

Muzhyliv Мужилів
- Location in Ternopil Oblast
- Coordinates: 49°18′26″N 25°5′41″E
- Country: Ukraine
- Oblast: Ternopil Oblast
- Raion: Ternopil Raion
- Hromada: Pidhaitsi urban hromada
- Time zone: UTC+2 (EET)
  - Summer (DST): UTC+3 (EEST)
- Postal code: 48011

Muzhyliv (Ukrainian: Мужилів) is a village in Pidhaitsi urban hromada, Ternopil Raion, Ternopil Oblast, Ukraine.

== History ==
The first written mention of the village was in 1439.

After the liquidation of the Pidhaitsi Raion on 19 July 2020, the village became part of the Ternopil Raion.

== Religion ==
- Saint Basil the Great Church (Resurrection; 1703, wooden),
- Church of the Intercession (Nativity of Christ; 1881, brick).

== Notable residents ==
- Myron F. Diduryk (1938–1970), American soldier, hero of the Vietnam War

== Sources ==
- (in Ukrainian) Кулинич П., Лашта В., Мужилів // Ternopil Encyclopedic Dictionary: in 4 v. / editorial board: H. Yavorskyi and other, Ternopil: "Zbruch", 2005, V. 2: К—О, S. 572—573. — ISBN 966-528-199-2.
- "Mużyłów". Geographical Dictionary of the Kingdom of Poland (in Polish). 6. Warszawa: Kasa im. Józefa Mianowskiego. 1885. p. 821–822.
