= Stephen H. Segal =

American editor

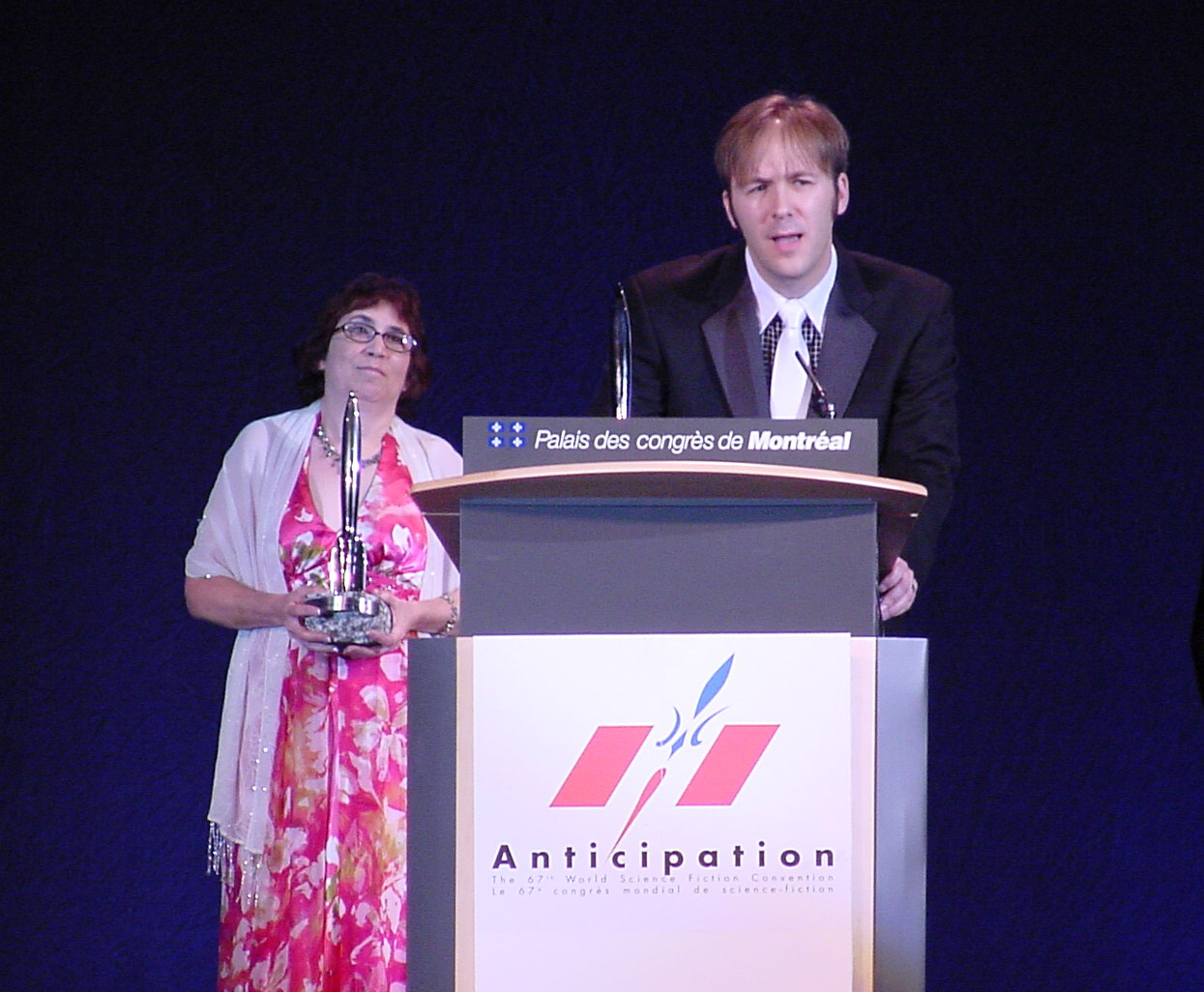
Stephen H. Segal accepting Hugo Award - August 2009.

Stephen H. Segal is a Hugo Award-winning American editor, author, journalist and publication designer.

== Editing career ==
Segal began his editorial career as a journalist at In Pittsburgh Weekly and WQED's Pittsburgh Magazine. In 2006, he joined the staff of the long-running fantasy magazine Weird Tales, and was named its editorial and creative director in early 2007 as part of an overall revamp of the publication. The April/May 2007 edition (issue #344) featured the magazine's first all-new design in almost 75 years; subsequently, under Segal's direction, Weird Tales published works by a wide range of strange-fiction authors including Michael Moorcock, Caitlín R. Kiernan, Cherie Priest, Norman Spinrad, Jay Lake, and Carrie Vaughn, as well as artwork by a younger generation of artists such as Molly Crabapple, Steven Archer, and Jason Levesque.

In 2009, Segal and fiction editor Ann VanderMeer won a Hugo Award for Weird Tales, the first and only time in its 75-year history. Segal and VanderMeer were also nominated for a 2009 World Fantasy Award for their work at the magazine, and were nominated again for Hugo Awards in 2010 and 2011. In 2010 Segal left the post of editorial and creative director to pursue book editing full-time; he remained Weird Tales' senior contributing editor, while VanderMeer was elevated to editor-in-chief.

As a freelance book editor and designer, Segal served as chief book-cover designer for the World Fantasy Award-winning publisher Prime Books and the urban fantasy line Juno Books. He also contributes to the Interstitial Arts Foundation, where he was a board member from 2005 to 2010.

In 2012, Segal was named editor in chief of the Philadelphia Weekly. During his tenure (2012-2016) both he and the paper received numerous awards, including Best Overall Non-Daily Paper, Best Headline Writing and Best Tabloid Page Design by the Society of Professional Journalists; Best Staff Blog by the national Association of Alternative Newsmedia; Best Headline Writing, Best News Presentation and General Excellence in Pennsylvania’s Newspaper of the Year Awards; and Best Special Project and the Distinguished Writing Award in the annual Keystone Press Awards.

Segal is currently Managing Editor of Legacy.com.

== Books ==
In 2011, Segal's book Geek Wisdom: The Sacred Teachings of Nerd Culture, written collaboratively with coauthors Zaki Hasan, N. K. Jemisin, Eric San Juan, and Genevieve Valentine, was published by Quirk Books. Released August 2011

This was followed in 2016 with Geek Parenting: What Joffrey, Jor-El, Maleficent, and the McFlys Teach Us about Raising a Family, co-authored with Valya Dudycz Lupescu. Released April 2016

His latest book, Forking Good, co-authored with Valya Dudycz Lupescu. is scheduled for release Fall 2019

== Personal life ==
A native of Atlantic City, New Jersey, he currently resides in Chicago.

== Works edited ==
- Philadelphia Weekly, 2012-2016
- Geek Wisdom, Released August 2011
- Weird Tales magazine, 2006-2009
- Co-editor, anthology, Weird Tales, 21st Century, Volume 1 (2007)
- Editor, Weird Tales: 85th anniversary issue (2008)
- Editor, Pittsburgh Magazine: Golden Quill Award finalist (2005)
- Editor, InPittsburgh Weekly: Keystone Press Award finalist (2000)

== Works designed ==
- Weird Tales: first redesign in 75 years (April 2007 issue)
- The Secret History of Moscow by Ekaterina Sedia
- The Alchemy of Stone by Ekaterina Sedia
- Myth-Chief by Robert Asprin
- Seeds of Change by John Joseph Adams
- Fantasy Magazine
