= Andrei Kushnir =

American painter

- Андрій Кушнір
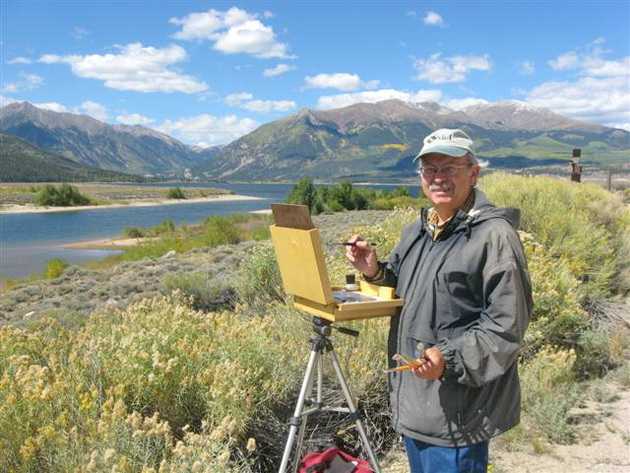
- Born: 30 August 1947 (age 79); Regensburg, Germany
- Known for: Painter
- Website: www.andreikushnir.com

Andrei Kushnir (Note: Ukrainian: Андрій Васильович Кушнір, romanized: Andrii Vasylovych Kushnir) (born August 30, 1947) is an American fine art painter. known for his landscapes, city views, and seascapes, he also has created genre, portraits and still life works. He is a resident of Maryland, with a studio in Washington, D.C.

== Biography and career ==
Andrei Kushnir was born in Regensburg, Germany, the son of Ukrainian parents who immigrated to the United States to escape Soviet communism.

In 1980, he began painting in oils, quickly progressing to on site painting of landscapes. Whilst self-taught, Kushnir sometimes, and developed his own naturalistic realist style by working outdoors in all seasons. For the rest of the decade, his work was exhibited in Washington, D.C.

In the 1990s, Kushnir began showing his work in competitive exhibitions throughout the United States.

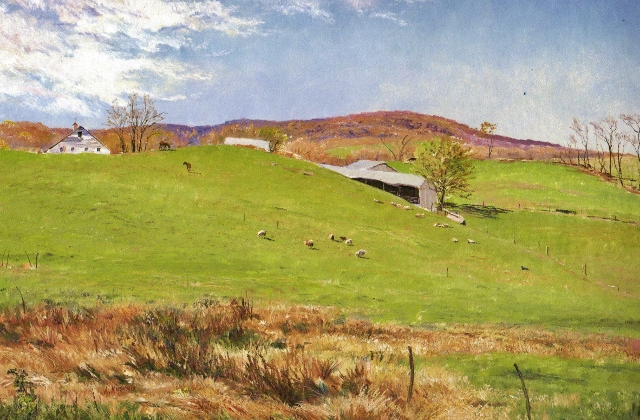
Sheep in the West Meadow. Collection of the Virginia Historical Society, Richmond, Virginia.

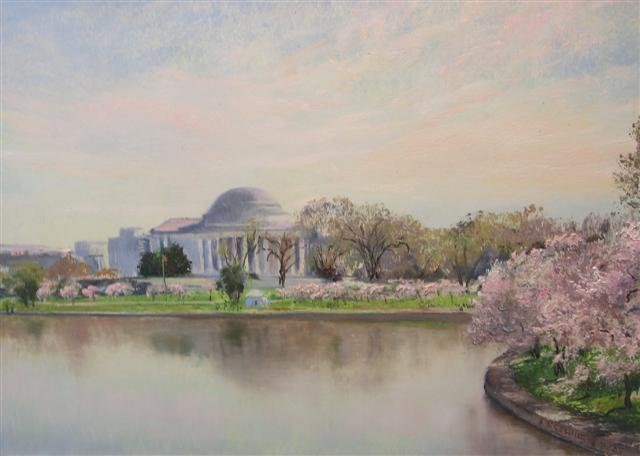
Cherry Blossoms

In the 2000s, Kushnir worked with artist Michele Martin Taylor to establish art galleries in Manhattan, Ellicott City, Maryland and Washington, D.C. They exhibited both their own works, and those of other mid-career artists and colleagues including the landscape painter Alexangel Estevez.

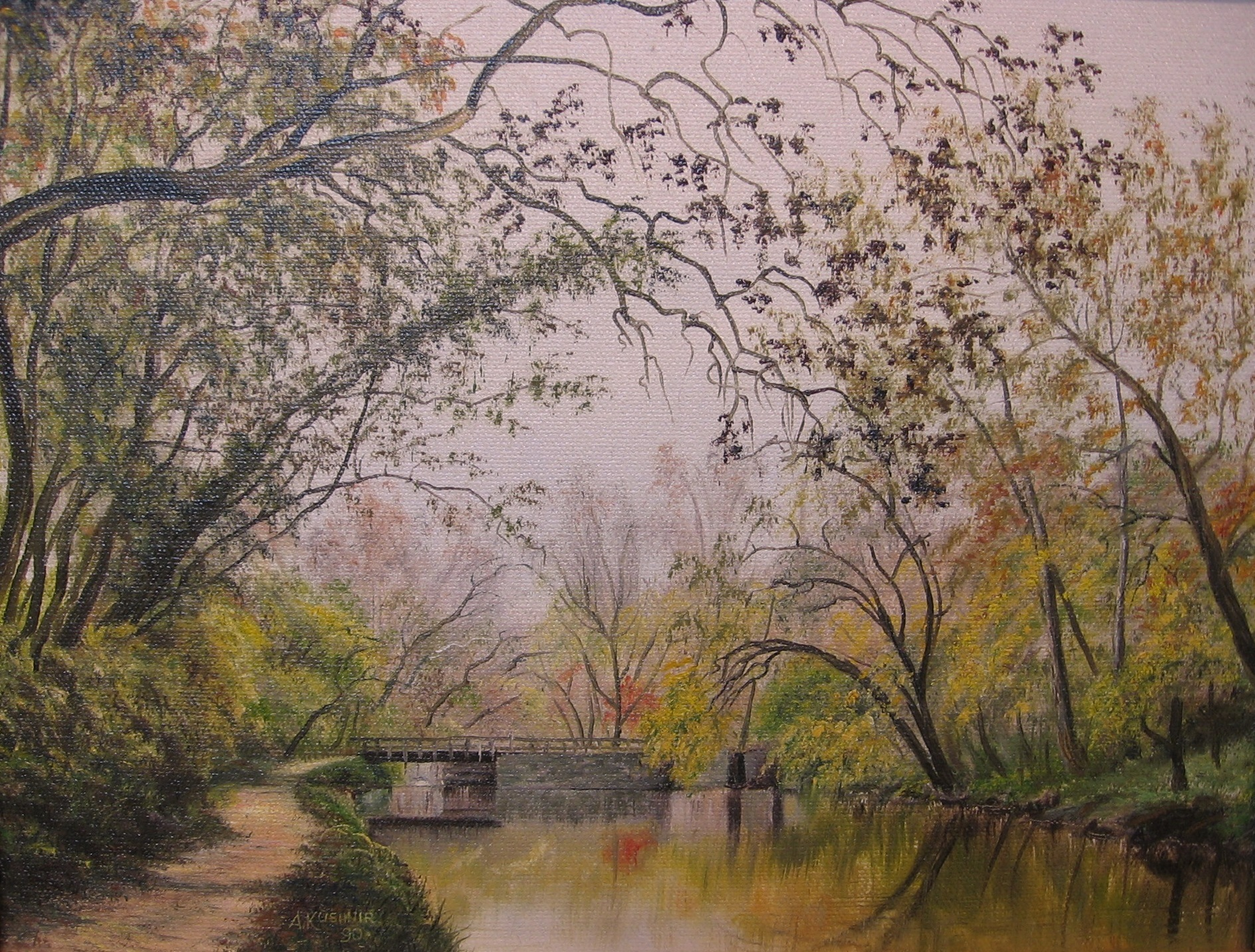
Autumn, 1990

Kushnir often focussed on the scenic beauties of the Potomac River throughout his career.

He was the founder of the Potomac River School artists, organizing exhibits for the group at the across Maryland and Washington D.C. The Sandy Spring Museum, Maryland, co-published an illustrated catalog about Kushnir's Potomac River painters group.

Kushnir devoted two of his own exhibitions of paintings to the Potomac River, My River and River Visions. His painting Potomac Riverscape received Juror's Choice Award at the 1st Biennial Maryland Regional Juried Art Exhibition, University of Maryland University College, in 2011.

He was a Signature Member of the National Oil and Acrylic Painters Society, the Salmagundi Club, NYC, the Washington Society of Landscape Painters, and was a juried Official U.S. Coast Guard Artist.

He worked from 2004 to 2015 painting en plein air landscapes throughout the Shenandoah Valley, Virginia, including subjects of historical, cultural, and scenic importance. The culmination of this project was the publication of Oh, Shenandoah by George F. Thompson Publishing, Staunton, Virginia, in December 2016.

The book contains 263 of the author's original paintings of the historic Shenandoah Valley and River. 71 of these paintings were exhibited from April 1 through September 11, 2016 at the Museum of the Shenandoah Valley, Winchester, Virginia. The book received favorable reviews, especially for the authenticity of its presentation of the Shenandoah Valley and its people.

An exhibition of 150 of the paintings from Oh, Shenandoah was held at the James Madison University Duke Gallery of Fine Art, Harrisonburg, Virginia, in May/June 2017. An exhibition titled "Oh, Shenandoah: Landscapes of Diversity" of 52 of the paintings from Oh, Shenandoah was held from December 2018 to September 2019 at the Virginia Museum of History and Culture, in Richmond, and a traveling version of the exhibit was organized by the museum.

In 2026, the artist donated 231 original paintings from "Oh, Shenandoah" to Shenandoah University, Winchester, Virginia, as well as his artistic personal records and his American Art Library. The donation was recognized at the University's Founders Day celebration on February 12, 2026.

A follow-on project of plein air paintings along the interstate highways running through the Shenandoah Valley resulted in publication of Kushnir's book The Shenandoah Valley's Interstates, Plein Air Paintings Along I-81, I-66 and I-64 by George F. Thompson Publishing, Staunton, Virginia, in July 2024.

== Publications ==
Other publications devoted to Kushnir's artistic works include subjects such as the C&O Canal, Potomac River, Shenandoah Valley, Blue Ridge Mountains, and marine scenes. The artist's non-fiction account of his father's life and times was published in 2020.

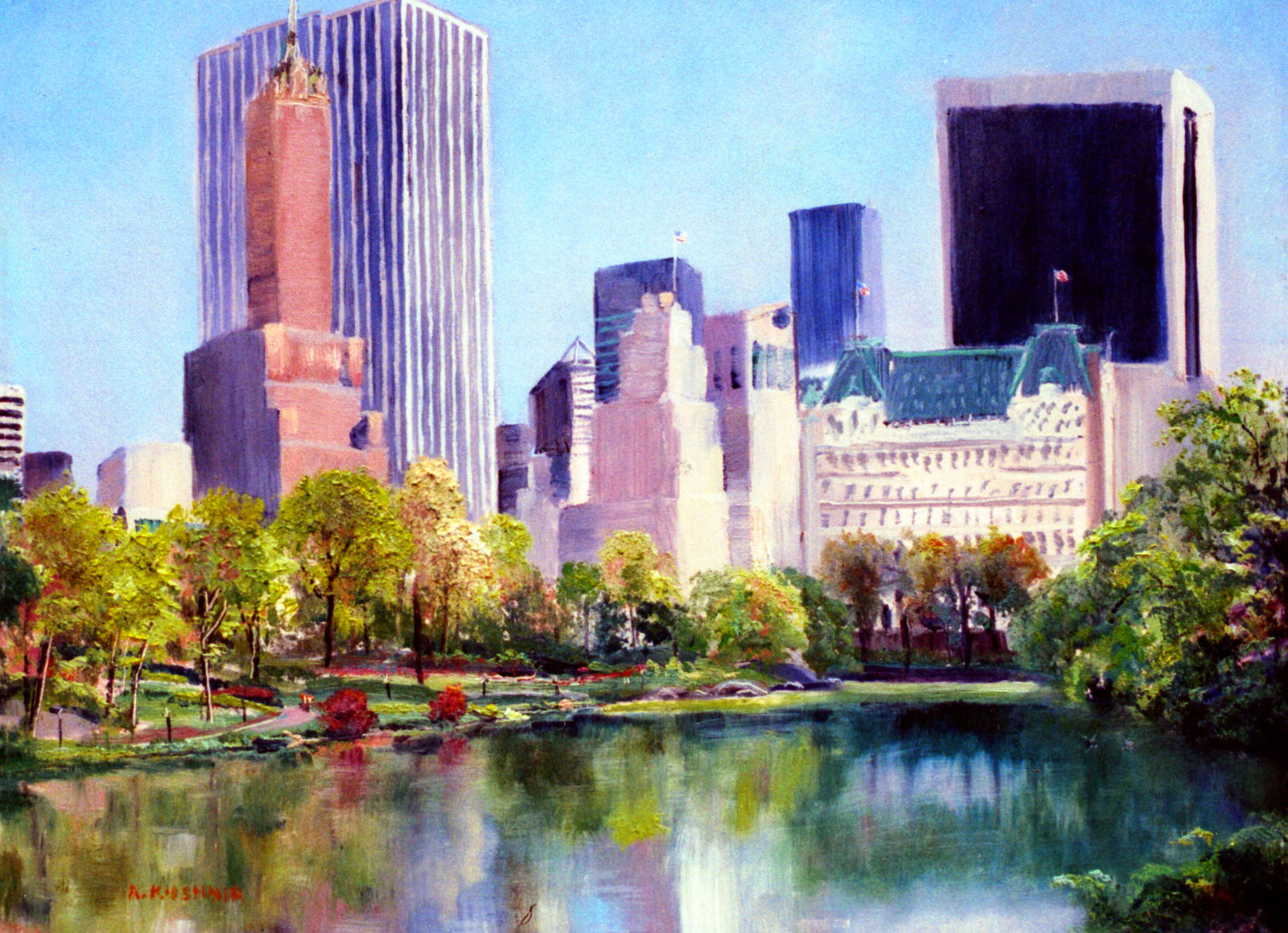
New York, from Central Park

== Collections ==
The artist's works are in the permanent collections of the U.S. Coast Guard, District of Columbia's Commission of Arts & Humanities, University of Maryland University College, Maryland, Museum of Florida's Art and Culture, Avon Park, Florida, Virginia Historical Society, Richmond, Virginia, The University Club, Washington, D.C. and presidents of the United States and Ukraine.

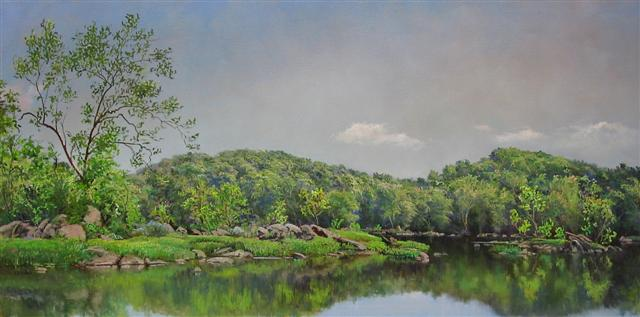
Potomac Riverscape

== Recognition ==
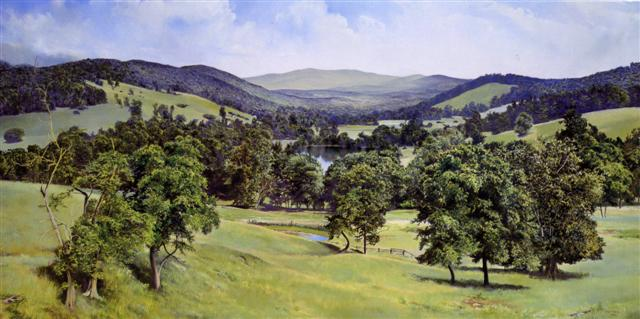
Sky Meadows

- Kushnir has been labeled a "true plein air artist." He is known for his ability to capture "a sense of place."
- A Washington D.C. art critic, Jim Magner, stated: "Andrei Kushnir's eye has been his teacher" and "[p]ure landscape painters like Andrei Kushnir…reach back to the way the earth was once and hold it dear." In a later post, Magner stated: "Andrei Kushnir feels the power of the land....He is touched by the spiritual power of a place. That power comes through the souls of the people who have lived there and loved the land--where they wondered and dreamed and exalted. Its from the millions who have soared above physical boundaries and have looked out on this creation, this Earth. They are there with him to share the wonderful moments of creation."
- Former lead curator and Lora M. Robins Curator of Art at the Virginia Museum of History & Culture, William M. S. Rasmussen, has said, of Kushnir's Virginia landscapes, "I was moved by their beauty and power, as I am sure viewers at the university will be....I recognized that [Kushnir's] work is first rate - as good as landscape painting gets."
- Kushnir was the first living artist selected for a single artist exhibition at the Virginia Historical Society (VHS).
- The VHS published a special monograph for this exhibit, with essay by Lora Robins Curator of Art, William M.S. Rasmussen.
- The United States agency Voice of America produced a video news feature about the artist and this exhibition and broadcast it to Ukraine and other European countries in 2004.
- In 2008, Kushnir's portrait paintings of important Ukrainian Americans were included in an exhibit of persons of Ukrainian descent important in world history at the Ukraine House, in Kyiv, Ukraine.
- Kushnir was featured in publications of the Nature Conservancy related to the role of the artist in the protection and enjoyment of natural resources.
