= Renata Babak =

Ukrainian/American opera singer (1934–2003)

- Born: Бабак Рената Володимирівна; 4 February 1934; Kharkiv, Ukraine
- Died: 31 December 2003 (aged 69); Silver Spring, Maryland, U.S.
- Occupation: mezzo-soprano singer

Renata Babak (February 4, 1934 in Kharkiv, Ukraine – December 31, 2003 in Silver Spring, Maryland) was a Ukrainian mezzo-soprano who defected to America from the Bolshoi Opera in 1973.

Babak died in December 2003 from pancreatic cancer at her home in Silver Spring, Maryland.
