= Walter Dudycz =

American politician

- Володимир Дудич
- Born: March 11, 1950 (age 76); Chicago, Illinois, United States
- Occupation: Legislator

Walter W. Dudycz (Note: Ukrainian: Володимир Василь Дудич, romanized: Volodymyr Vasyl Dudych) (born March 11, 1950) is an American politician who served as a Republican member of the Illinois Senate from 1985 until 2003.

== Biography ==
Dudycz, a Ukrainian American was born in Chicago to a janitor mother and a factory worker father. He was raised on the West Side of Chicago. Dudycz was a veteran of the United States Army and served during the Vietnam War. After the war, he became a detective with the Chicago Police Department. Dudycz was elected to the Illinois Senate in 1984. Dudycz earned a bachelor's degree from Northeastern Illinois University. In 1990, Dudycz ran for the United States House of Representatives against longtime Democratic incumbent Frank Annunzio, but lost. After the 2001 decennial redistricting, he chose to retire from the Illinois Senate in 2001. His old district had been dismantled, and he faced the prospect of running against incumbent Democrat James DeLeo, whose district had absorbed most of the Chicago portion of his old district, or incumbent Republican Dave Sullivan, whose district had absorbed much of the suburban portion. He was the last Republican state senator representing a significant portion of Chicago.

During the 2008 Republican Party presidential primaries, Dudycz ran to be a delegate to the 2008 Republican National Convention from Illinois's 9th congressional district for the presidential campaign of former Governor Mitt Romney.

== Personal life ==
Dudycz is married to Oksana. He had two daughters; one of whom is writer Valya Dudycz Lupescu.
