= Myron F. Diduryk =

American U.S. Army Major

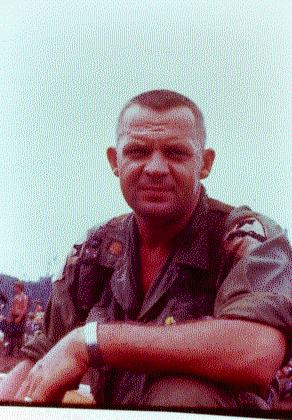
- Born: July 15, 1938; Mużyłów, Second Polish Republic (now Muzhyliv, Ukraine)
- Died: April 24, 1970 (aged 31); South Vietnam
- Burial place: Fort Benning, Georgia, U.S.
- Military career
- Allegiance: United States
- Branch: United States Army
- Service years: 1960–1970
- Rank: Major
- Nickname: Mad Cossack
- Conflicts: Vietnam War †; Battle of Ia Drang
- Awards: Silver Star (2); Bronze Star (2) (1 "V"); Purple Heart (1)

Myron F. Diduryk (July 15, 1938 – April 24, 1970) was a United States Army major, who played a key role as an infantry company commander in the Battle of Ia Drang, the first major battle of the Vietnam War. His exploits in that battle were described by Hal Moore in, We Were Soldiers Once and Young. Moore said that Diduryk was, "… the finest battlefield company commander I had ever seen, bar none." Diduryk was killed in action on his second tour in South Vietnam.

== Early life and education ==
Born in Mużyłów in 1938, Diduryk emigrated to the United States with his parents in 1950. His family settled in Somerville, New Jersey. After graduating from St. Peter's Preparatory School in Jersey City, New Jersey, he enrolled at Saint Peter's College in Jersey City, New Jersey, where he was a member of Company N-8 National Society of Pershing Rifles and earned a Bachelor of Science degree in physics from Saint Peter's and was commissioned as a Regular Army Officer on June 5, 1960.

== Career ==
Diduryk completed Airborne School and Ranger School at Fort Benning, Georgia. He served tours of duty at Fort Benning and in Germany. He was married and the father of two children.

During Myron Diduryk's first tour of duty in Vietnam he served as the company commander of Bravo Company 2nd Battalion, 7th Cavalry Regiment, 1st Cavalry Division (Airmobile). In November 1965 he played a key role in the Battle of the Ia Drang, the first major battle of the Vietnam War. His exploits in that battle are described by General Hal Moore in his best-selling book, We Were Soldiers Once and Young ... in which Moore describes Diduryk as "… the finest battlefield company commander I had ever seen, bar none."

Diduryk was subsequently promoted to major and returned to South Vietnam in October 1969, as the operations officer of the 2nd Battalion, 12th Cavalry, 1st Cavalry Division. On April 24, 1970, his battalion commander ordered his command helicopter to land and check out a North Vietnamese soldier who had been killed by the door gunner. As Major Diduryk emerged from his helicopter, he was fatally shot in the stomach by ambushing North Vietnamese soldiers.

Diduryk is buried at Fort Benning Main Post Cemetery, Georgia. The Ukrainian American Veterans Post 30 in South River, New Jersey was named in his honor. Diduryk's name is listed on Panel 11W, Line 44 of the Vietnam Veteran's Memorial Wall in Washington, DC. There is also a paver stone dedicated in his memory at the New Jersey Vietnam Veterans Memorial in Holmdel, N.J.

== Awards and decorations ==
- Silver Star, with oak leaf cluster
- Bronze Star, with oak leaf cluster and "V" device
- Purple Heart
- Air Medal, 23rd award
- Army Commendation Medal
- Army of Occupation Medal
- National Defense Service Medal
- Vietnam Service Medal, with 5 campaign stars
- Vietnam Gallantry Cross with palm
- Republic of Vietnam Campaign Medal
- Senior Parachute Badge
- Combat Infantryman's Badge
- Ranger Tab
