= Valya Dudycz Lupescu =

American novelist

- Валя Дудич Лупеску
- Lupescu at the 2026 World Fantasy Convention
- Born: February 4, 1974 (age 52); Chicago, Illinois, United States
- Education: DePaul University, School of the Art Institute of Chicago
- Occupation: Novelist
- Writing career
- Genres: Magic realism, fantasy, speculative fiction
- Notable work: The Silence of Trees
- Website: www.vdlupescu.com

Valya Dudycz Lupescu (Note: Ukrainian: Валя Дудич Лупеску, romanized: Valia Dudych Lupesku) is a Ukrainian American writer of magic realism and speculative fiction.

== Background and personal life ==
A second-generation Ukrainian American, Lupescu's writing reflects both her Ukrainian heritage and her American life. She holds an MFA in Writing from the School of the Art Institute of Chicago and a B.A. in English from DePaul University, Chicago. She has taught at DePaul University, Loyola University, and Columbia College in Chicago. Lupescu is the daughter of retired Illinois State Senator Walter Dudycz. She is divorced and lives in Chicago, Illinois with her partner and fellow writer, Stephen H. Segal and her three children.

== Works ==
Lupescu's debut novel, The Silence of Trees, was published in 2010 by Wolfsword Press and was selected as a semifinalist in the 2008 Amazon Breakthrough Novel Award. Lupescu co-wrote two books of nonfiction with partner Segal, Geek Parenting: What Joffrey, Jor-El, Maleficent, and the McFlys Teach Us About Raising a Family, published in 2016 by Quirk Books, and Forking Good: An Unofficial Cookbook for Fans of The Good Place, published in 2019 by Quirk Books.

Lupescu's graphic novel, Mother Christmas Volume 1: The Muse is the first in a trilogy that "reimagines the origin story of Santa Claus, based on the Mediterranean legend of St. Nicholas."

Lupescu's short story, "Honey" was selected for the Year's Best Dark Fantasy and Horror 2019, edited by Paula Guran. Lupescu's poems were included in the Ukrainian American Poets Respond Anthology, published by Yara Arts Group and Poets of Queens in response to the 2022 Russian Invasion of Ukraine.

Lupescu is also the founding editor of Conclave: A Journal of Character and occasionally teaches workshops around Chicago and online. Lupescu founded and works creatively with artists, writers, and musicians who are members of the Coop: Chicago Creative Collaborative Salon.

== Contributions to the Chicago Literary Hall of Fame ==
Lupescu served on the board of directors for the Chicago Writers Association and was one of the founders of the Chicago Literary Hall of Fame. The Chicago Literary Hall of Fame had its inaugural Induction Ceremony on November 20, 2010, at Northeastern Illinois University. Lupescu was the Director of Event Planning for the event that inducted Saul Bellow, Gwendolyn Brooks, Richard Wright, Nelson Algren, Lorraine Hansberry, and Studs Terkel.

In 2012, Lupescu worked with Founder and Executive Director Don Evans of the Chicago Literary Hall of Fame to design a new award to honor living writers, the Fuller Award for Lifetime Achievement. The first writer to be honored with the Fuller Award was Gene Wolfe at a ceremony held on March 17, 2012, hosted by Gary K. Wolfe at the Sanfilippo Estate in Barrington Hills, IL. Among those who paid tribute to Wolfe were Neil Gaiman, Michael Swanwick, Audrey Niffeneger, and others.

== Books ==
- The Silence of Trees (2010, Wolfsword Press, author)
- Mother Christmas Volume 1: The Muse (2022, Rosarium Publishing, author)
- Forking Good: An Unofficial Cookbook for Fans of The Good Place (2019, Quick Books, co-author with Stephen H. Segal)
- Geek Parenting: What Joffrey, Jor-El, Maleficent, and the McFlys Teach Us About Raising a Family (2016, Quick Books, co-author with Stephen H. Segal)
- Conclave: A Journal of Character (2008, 2009–2010, editor) Various artists and authors with a focus on character-driven prose, poetry, and art.

== See also ==
- Lupescu
- Magda Lupescu
