= Nicholas Krawciw =

American military person (1935–2021)

Nicholas Krawciw Микола Кравців
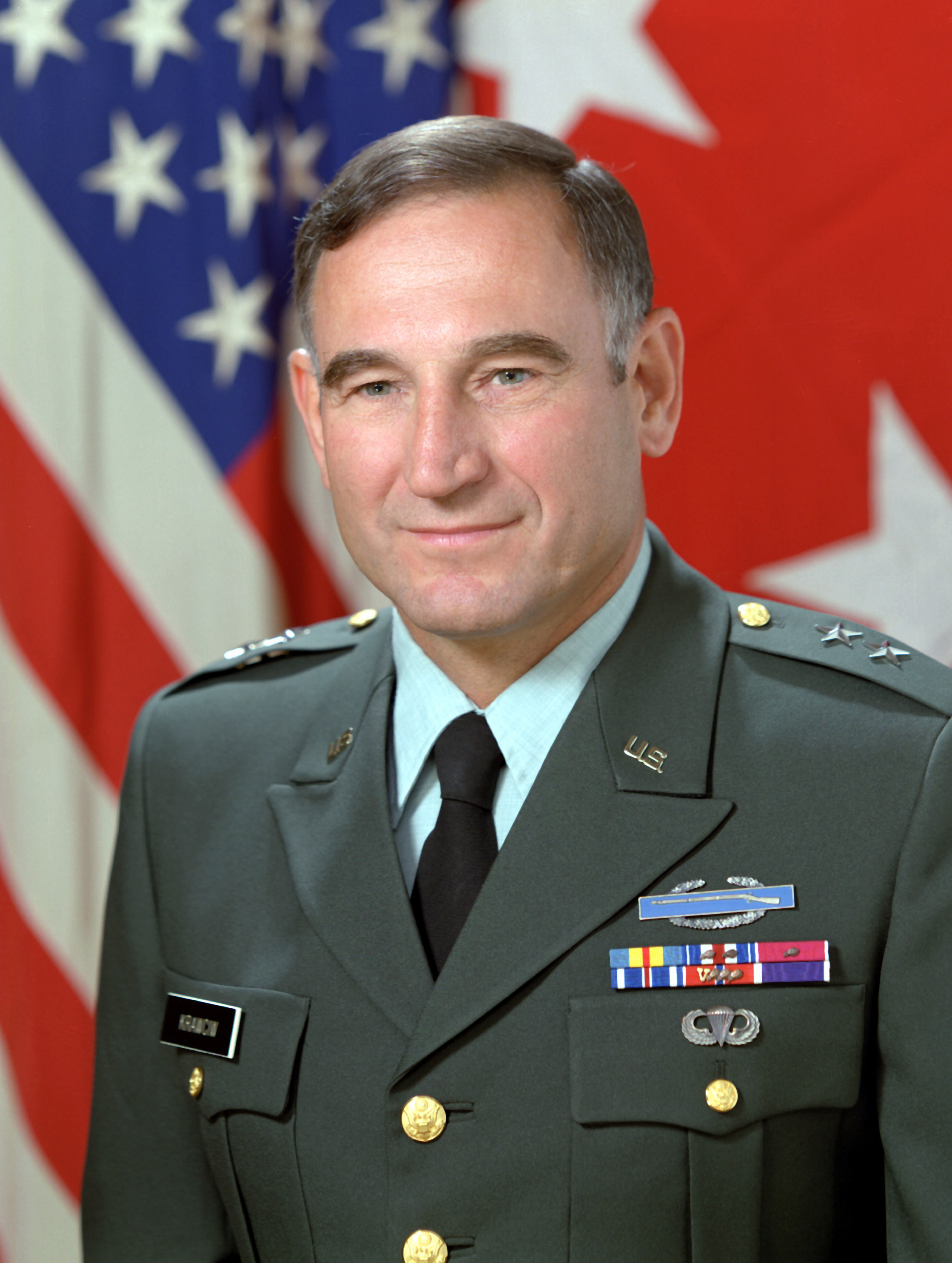
- Krawciw in 1987
- Born: November 28, 1935; Lwów, Poland (present-day Lviv, Ukraine)
- Died: September 29, 2021 (aged 85); Fort Belvoir, Virginia
- Military career
- Allegiance: United States
- Branch: United States Army
- Service years: 1959–1990
- Rank: Major General
- Nickname: Hoko
- Commands: 3rd Infantry Division; 1st Brigade, 3rd Armored Division
- Conflicts: Vietnam War
- Awards: Defense Distinguished Service Medal; Army Distinguished Service Medal; Silver Star (3); Legion of Merit (2); Distinguished Flying Cross; Bronze Star Medal (4); Air Medal (8); Purple Heart

Nicholas Stephen Hordij Krawciw (Ukrainian: Микола Кравців) (November 28, 1935 – September 29, 2021) was a United States Army Major General who served two tours of duty in the Vietnam War, and served as commanding general of the 3rd Infantry Division from 1987 to 1989.

== Early life and education ==
Krawciw was born on November 28, 1935, to Bohdan and Neonila Krawciw, in Lwów, Poland (present-day Ukraine). His family moved to Germany during World War II and to the United States in 1949. As a youth, Krawciw grew up in a Philadelphia Ukrainian-American community and was able to speak the Ukrainian language. He was a member of Plast, a Ukrainian scouting organization, and attended the Bordentown Military Institute. He entered the United States Military Academy at West Point in 1955, where he played varsity soccer, became a cadet regimental commander, and was in the graduating class of 1959. Krawciw earned a Bachelor of Science degree from the United States Military Academy and later received a Master of Science degree in international relations from George Washington University.

== Military career ==
Krawciw was one of the first members of his class to go to Vietnam, and was severely wounded in an ambush. After recuperating, Captain Krawciw commanded a cavalry troop at Fort Hood where he co-invented an advanced armor system for ground vehicles, a composite system similar to that later incorporated into tank design.

Following a tour in the Tactical Department at West Point, Major Krawciw returned to Vietnam as S-3 of the 3rd Squadron, 5th Cavalry. During a year of intense fighting along the DMZ, Nick was awarded three Silver Stars and was instrumental in devising new tactics and counter measures that frustrated a tenacious enemy.

Major Krawciw was sent to Israel in 1972 as the chief operations officer for the United Nations Truce Supervision Organization. Promoted to lieutenant colonel, he produced intelligence reports prior to the start of the Yom Kippur War that led to a personal commendation from the Chief of Staff of the Army, General Abrams.

Krawciw commanded the 1st Squadron, 2nd Armored Cavalry Regiment in 1974, and later served at Headquarters, United States Army, Europe. Following a year as a Fellow at the Hoover Institution at Stanford, Colonel Krawciw was assigned to the Training and Doctrine Command as director of concepts and doctrine in combat development. Here, his work on maneuver doctrine revolutionized the way the army fought, was organized, and was trained. Krawciw's ideas influenced victories in Operation Just Cause, Operation Desert Storm, Operation Iraqi Freedom, and many important but smaller contingencies.

In 1979, Colonel Krawciw returned to Germany to command the 1st Brigade of the 3rd Armored Division. Back home after two years in command, Krawciw was nominated by the Army Chief of Staff to attend the Senior Seminar of the Department of State. In 1982, he was assigned to the army staff and then as military assistant to the Deputy Secretary of Defense.

Promoted to brigadier general, Krawciw returned to Germany in 1984 as assistant division commander of the 3rd Infantry Division and then executive officer to the Supreme Allied Commander, Europe. In 1987, Major General Krawciw assumed command of the 3rd Infantry Division. His final active duty assignment was director of NATO policy in the Office of the Secretary of Defense in 1989 to 1990. Krawciw retired from the army on July 1, 1990.

== Post military ==
Since he spoke Ukrainian fluently, Krawciw was urged by the United States Department of Defense to become involved in assisting the newly independent Ukraine to establish political freedom and a marketplace economy. With the approval of the U.S. government, Krawciw met with Ukrainian officials and agreed to help them set up a non-profit, non-governmental political science institute.

At the behest of the Chief of Staff of the U.S. Army and the Undersecretary of Defense, Krawciw and his wife Christina moved to Ukraine in 1992 where, for a year, he worked to reorganize, educate, and restructure the Ukrainian military on Western lines. Beginning in 1993, as a consultant to the Secretary of Defense on Ukrainian matters, and later as Secretary of Defense Senior Military Representative to Ukraine, Krawciw was largely responsible for converting the Ukrainian Armed Forces from a communist army that was feared throughout Europe to one that now has democratic standards.

The country had not governed itself in 300 years, so there was no body of law, no democratic tradition, and a military organized on the totalitarian model with corresponding values. Krawciw assisted in professional development, including ethics, guided reduction of forces to appropriate levels, and identified sound leaders. Progress was slow and difficult, but ultimately effective.

The culmination of his efforts was the refusal of the Ukrainian Army to disperse the Orange Revolution demonstration that ultimately overturned the fraudulent election of 2004, thus justifying the years of dedicated effort Krawciw and other American officers had spent to achieve a democratic Army in Ukraine. Some of the programs Krawciw organized or participated in were Operation Peace Shield and Operation Sea Breeze.

Krawciw was instrumental in establishing educational exchange programs with the Ukrainian military, devoting many hours to sponsoring and escorting both military and civilian groups from Ukraine around the United States.

In 1995, in addition to his work with Ukraine, Krawciw began 10 years service as president of The Dupuy Institute; and is now chairman of the board. Under Nick's leadership, the institute, dedicated to scholarly analysis of military historical trends, expanded its activity.

Krawciw and his wife Christina had a daughter, two sons and six grandchildren, one of whom died before 2021. He died at Fort Belvoir, Virginia in 2021 and was interred at the West Point Cemetery.

== Honors ==
Krawciw received the West Point Distinguished Graduate Award in 2006. He was inducted into the Oklahoma Military Hall of Fame in 2013.

== Awards and decorations ==
Krawciw's awards and decorations include the Silver Star with two oak leaf clusters, the Legion of Merit with oak leaf cluster, the Distinguished Flying Cross, the Bronze Star Medal (four total, two for valor), eight Air Medals and the Purple Heart. Krawciw was awarded the Defense Distinguished Service Medal in 1984 and the Army Distinguished Service Medal in 1990.

== See also ==
- Ukrainian American Veterans
