= Bohdan Bejmuk =

Ukrainian-American aerospace consultant

- Богдан Беймук
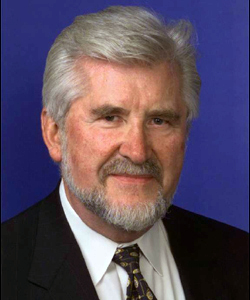
- Known for: Aerospace engineer

Bohdan Ihor Bejmuk (Note: Ukrainian: Богдан Ігор Беймук, romanized: Bohdan Ihor Beimuk) is a Ukrainian-American aerospace consultant and former Boeing manager who was a member of the 2009 Augustine Commission and is the current chairman of the Constellation program Standing Review Board. He received his BSME (1964) and MSME (1967) from the University of Colorado.

He was the Executive Vice President and Chief Engineer on Sea Launch, an international joint venture. He was responsible for directing all aspects of development for the company, leading the effort of several thousands of American, Russian, Ukrainian and Norwegian engineers and shipyard workers. After completion of the development, he was the manager of Sea Launch operations at Home Port in Long Beach, California and at the launch region in the Pacific Ocean.

His honors include: Membership in the International Academy of Astronautics and the Lloyd V. Berkner Award. He speaks English, Russian, Ukrainian, French, Polish, and Spanish.
