= Vlad Skots =

- Володимир Зіновійович Скоць
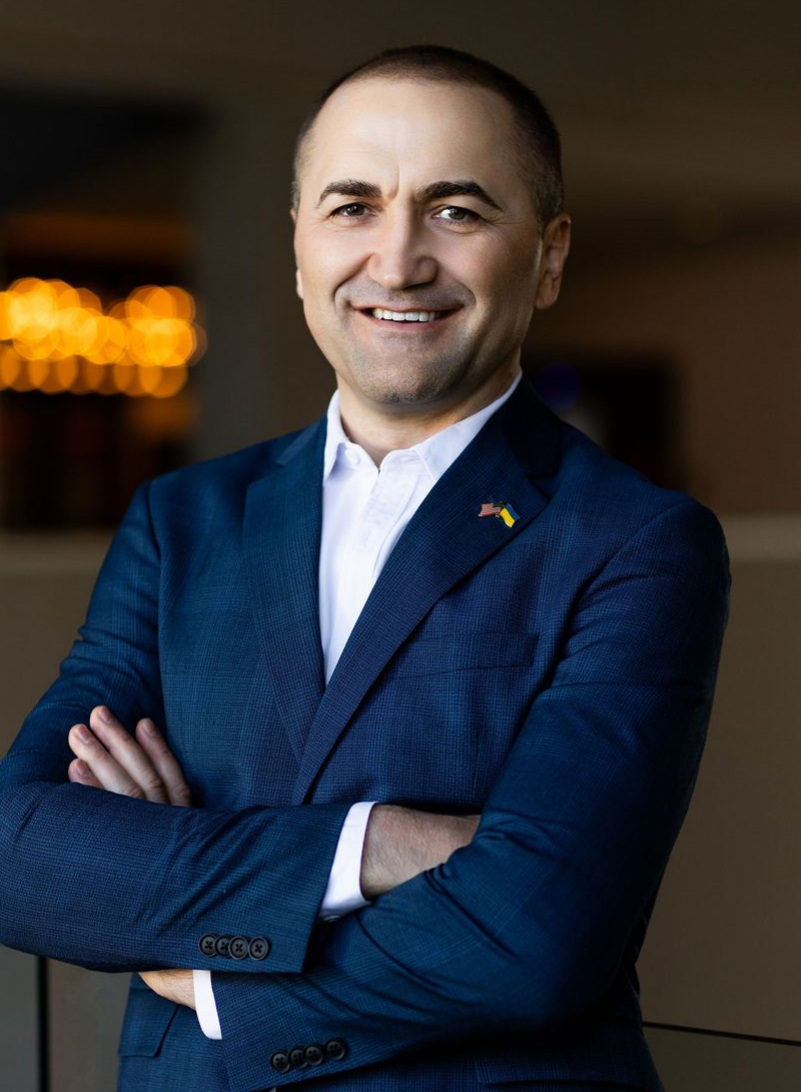
- Skots in 2020
- Born: March 16, 1979 (age 46); Volyn Oblast, Ukraine
- Occupation: Businessman
- Known for: Supporting the development of Ukrainian-American relations
- Awards: Order of Merit (Ukraine)

Vlad Skots (Ukrainian: Влад Скоць; born 16 March 1979) is an American businessman and public activist, founder and president of USKO Inc., chairman of the Ukrainian-American House, awarded the Order of Merit, III degree.

== Early life ==
Born on March 16, 1979, into a large family in the village of Huta Kaminska in Volyn Oblast, Ukraine. He has nine brothers.

In the spring of 2001, he immigrated to the US with his brothers and settled in Sacramento, California.

== Career ==
His first years in America were marked by difficult conditions of adaptation: Skots worked as a cleaner in a Chinese restaurant on night shifts, studied English during the day, did construction work, and delivered mail. In 2003, he obtained a Commercial driver's license and began his career in trucking. In 2004, he saved up enough money to buy his first truck. A few years later, he bought a second truck and began hiring people to work for his company, which he named USKO.

In 2006, Vlad Skots founded a freight transportation logistics company, USKO Inc. As of 2025, the company generates over $150 million per year and has operations in the United States, Mexico, Poland, and Ukraine. USKO Inc. employs over 150 full-time staff. The company introduced the Motion TMS (Transportation Management System) cloud-based mobile app, transportation management system, that provide services for accountants, brokers, safety managers, dispatchers, and drivers.

== Public activities ==
Vlad Skots actively supports the development of Ukrainian-American relations and has headed the Ukrainian-American House charity organization for many years. The organization was founded in 2018 as a cultural initiative and has developed into a multifunctional institution that implements humanitarian, economic, and educational projects. Among other things, the organization develops public diplomacy, acting as an intermediary between Ukrainian communities in the US and American institutions.

Skots organized numerous campaigns in support of Ukraine, is the initiator, co-founder, and keynote speaker of the annual Freedom Means Business forum in Sacramento, USA. In 2025, this forum, organized in partnership with the Consulate General of Ukraine in San Francisco and the US-Ukraine Business Council, brought together more than 180 participants, including representatives of the US and Ukrainian governments, diplomats, business leaders, and experts.

== Awards ==
- Order of Merit, III degree (Decree of the President of Ukraine No. 595/2022)
- Medal of the State Border Service of Ukraine “For Cooperation” (2025).
