= Yelena Dudochkin =

American singer

- Born: 1976 (age 49–50); Kiev, Ukrainian SSR, Soviet Union (now Kyiv, Ukraine)
- Occupation: Operatic soprano

Yelena Dudochkin (born 1976) is a soprano known for her "gorgeous, expressive and rich voice...a true pearl of the opera" (Voice of America) and her "dramatic intelligence" (Boston Globe).

== Biography ==
Dudochkin was born in Kiev in 1976, the daughter of an oil and gas engineer and a concert pianist. She immigrated to the United States at the age of 10. As a child, she studied piano which she pursued further at the Juilliard School while also a student at Columbia University. Dudochkin worked at Morgan Stanley, where her team was twice recognized as the top sector analyst team by Institutional Investor. Dudochkin simultaneously started her vocal training at the Manhattan School of Music. In 2009, Yelena won a principal role in The Nose by Shostakovich with Opera Boston in her first ever audition.

== Career ==
Dudochkin launched her career as a soprano, debuting with Opera Boston in the New England premier of The Nose in February, 2009. She also won First Prize in the Golden Voices of America International Vocal Competition, performing in the winner's concert at Carnegie Hall. As a singer, Dudochkin has performed in over 40 concerts and 5 operas. Dudochkin's concert performances include performances in Carnegie Hall, Jordan Hall, Alice Tully Hall and Boston's Symphony Hall. Her opera performances include The Nose, Don Pasquale, Iolanta, Tsar's Bride, Manon, Rigoletto, and The Snow Maiden. Dudochkin's voice has been described as having a "fully bodied, supple voice." She recently performed in the world premier of Magic Mirror. Between the first and second runs, the composer specifically expanded the role, dedicating a new aria to Dudochkin. Dudochkin is perhaps best known for her performance of Die Lorelei by Franz Liszt at Jordan Hall.

== Other Affiliations ==
Dudochkin is currently on the Board of the Columbia University Club of New England.
