= Michael J. Yaremchuk =

- Education: Yale College (BA); Columbia University Vagelos College of Physicians and Surgeons (MD)
- Occupations: surgeon, professor
- Employer(s): Harvard Medical School; Massachusetts General Hospital

Michael J. Yaremchuk is a Professor of surgery, Part-Time at Harvard Medical School and Chief of Craniofacial Surgery at its affiliated Massachusetts General Hospital.

== Education ==
Yaremchuk received his B.A. degree from Yale College in 1972, and his M.D. from the Columbia College of Physicians and Surgeons in 1976. He completed his surgical residency at Harvard Deaconess Hospital (1976-1982), and his plastic surgery residency at Johns Hopkins Hospital (1982-85).

== Notable works ==
- "Acute and Definitive Management of Traumatic Osteocutaneous Defects of the Lower Extremity." Yaremchuk, Michael J. M.D.; Brumback, Robert J. M.D.; Manson, Paul N. M.D.; Burgess, Andrew R. M.D.; Poka, Atila M.D.; Weiland, Andrew J. M.D. Plastic & Reconstructive Surgery: July 1987 - Volume 80 - Issue 1
