= List of people from Galicia (Eastern Europe): modern period =

The following list includes famous people of various nationalities who were born in or resided for a significant period in Galicia (Eastern Europe), part of Ukraine. (18th–20th centuries).

== A–F ==
- Roman Abraham, general of the Polish Army, born in Lviv
- Eliezer Adler, founder of the Jewish Community in Gateshead, England, born in Stanislau
- Shmuel Agnon, Jewish writer, founder of modern Israeli Hebrew literature, born in Buchach
- Kazimierz Ajdukiewicz, philosopher and logician, born in Ternopil
- Izak Aloni (born Izak Schächter), Polish-Israeli chess master, born in Lviv
- Antin Angelovych, first Greek Catholic metropolitan of Lviv (1808–14), born in Hryniv, near Bibrka
- Andrzej Alojzy Ankwicz, Count, Roman Catholic Archbishop of Lvov (1815–33), and Archbishop of Prague (1833–38), born in Kraków
- Alicia Appleman-Jurman, Jewish American writer, raised from the age of five in Buchach
- Muhammad Asad (born Leopold Weiss), Pakistan's ambassador to UN, born in Lviv
- Daniel Auster, first Hebrew mayor of Jerusalem, born in Stanislau
- Nahman Avigad, Israeli archaeologist, born in Zavalov, near Pidhaytsi
- Jacob Avigdor, last Chief Rabbi of Drohobych, born in Tyrawa Wołoska, near Sanok
- Emanuel Ax, Jewish American pianist, born in Lviv
- Baal Shem Tov (Yisroel ben Eliezer), founder of Hasidism
- Yosef Babad, rabbi and posek, born in Przeworsk
- Kazimierz Feliks Badeni, Count, Minister-President of Austria (1895–97)
- Meir Balaban, historian, born in Lviv
- Adolph Baller, Austrian-American pianist, born in Brody
- Oswald Balzer, historian, born in Khodoriv, near Zidichov
- Stefan Banach, eminent mathematician, born in Kraków
- Stepan Bandera, leader of the Ukrainian nationalist movement, born in Uhryniv Staryi, near Kalush
- Iuliu Barasch, physician and writer, born in Brody
- Kazimierz Bartel, Prime Minister of Poland, born in Lviv
- Oleksander Barvinsky, Ukrainian politician, born in Shliakhnyntsi, near Ternopil
- Eugeniusz Baziak, Archbishop of Lvov and Apostolic Administrator of Kraków, born in Ternopil
- Józef Bem, Polish general, national hero of Poland and Hungary, born in Tarnów
- Alexander Beliavsky, Ukrainian-Slovenian chess master, born in Lviv
- Elisabeth Bergner, Austrian-British actress, born in Drohobych
- St. Józef Bilczewski, Roman Catholic Archbishop of Lviv, born in Wilamowice near Kęty
- Josef Samuel Bloch, Austrian rabbi and deputy, born in Dukla
- Michał Bobrzyński, Governor of Galicia (1908–13), born in Kraków
- Naftali Botwin, revolutionary terrorist, born in Kamianka-Buzka
- Mieczysław Boruta-Spiechowicz, Polish general, born in Rzeszów
- Naftule Brandwein, klezmer clarinetist, born in Przemyslany
- Berl Broder (born Berl Margulis), Jewish singer, born in Brody
- Aleksander Brückner, distinguished Polish slavist and historian of literature, born in Berezhany
- Martin Buber, Jewish philosopher, lived in Lviv
- Solomon Buber, Jewish scholar, born in Lviv
- Nykyta Budka, the first Ukrainian Canadian Greek Catholic bishop, born in Dobromirka
- Arthur Frank Burns, American economist, born in Stanislau
- Zvi Hirsch Chajes, Talmudic scholar, born in Brody
- Oscar Chajes, Austrian-American chess master, born in Brody
- Georges Charpak, French physicist (Nobel Prize in 1992), born in Dubrovytsia
- Leon Chwistek, painter, logician, philosopher, born in Kraków
- Zbigniew Cybulski, Polish actor, born in Kniaże, near Stanislau
- Ignacy Daszyński, Polish politician, born in Zbarazh
- Isaac Deutscher, Polish-British political activist and historian, born in Chrzanów
- Józef Dominik, Polish chess master, born in Dobczyce
- Michael Dorfman, Yiddish and Hebrew writer, born in Lviv
- Albin Dunajewski, Roman Catholic Bishop of Kraków and Cardinal, born in Stanislau
- Arthur Dunkelblum, Belgian chess master, born in Kraków
- Karol Durski-Trzaska, general, born in Spas, near Staryi Sambir
- Elimelech of Lizhensk, great Hasidic rebbe and tzadik
- Isaac Erter, Hebrew language writer, born in Janischok
- Józef Feldman, historian, born in Przemyśl
- Ida Fink, Israeli writer, born in Zbarazh
- Salo Flohr, Czech-Ukrainian chess master, born in Horodenka
- Jacob Frank, Jewish messianic claimant who combined Judaism and Christianity
- Ivan Franko, Ukrainian writer, born in Nahuevychi near Drohobych
- Petro Franko, Ukrainian educator, born in Nahuevychi near Drohobych
- Karl Emil Franzos, Austrian writer, born in Chortkiv
- Aleksander Fredro, Polish writer, born in Surochów, near Jaroslav
- Amalia Freud (born Amalia Nathansohn), mother of Sigmund Freud, born in Brody
- Mikhail Fridman, Russian banker of Jewish descent from Lviv
- Filip Friedman, historian, born in Lviv
- Henryk Friedman, chess master from Lviv
- Yisroel Friedman, Hasidic Rebbe of Ruzhin

== G–K ==
- Mordechai Gebirtig, Yiddish poet and songwriter, born in Kraków
- Abraham Gershon of Kitov, Hasidic rabbi of Kitov and Brody, born in Kuty
- Agenor Goluchowski, Count, interior minister of Austria (1859–60)
- Agenor Maria Gołuchowski, Count, foreign affairs minister of Austria-Hungary (1895–1906)
- Maurycy Gottlieb, Jewish painter from Drohobych
- Leopold Gottlieb, painter from Drohobych
- Chaim Gross, Austrian-American sculptor, born in Kolomyia
- Feliks Gross, Polish-American sociologist, born in Kraków
- Henryk Grossman, Polish-German economist of Jewish descent, born in Kraków
- Artur Grottger, painter, born in Ottyniowice, near Zhydachiv
- Kazimierz Górski, coach of Polish national football (soccer) team, born in Lviv
- Andrzej Kusionowicz Grodyński, Appeal Court Judge born in Gdów
- Ludwig Gumplowicz, sociologist and lawyer, born in Kraków
- Wilhelm Habsburg, Austrian archduke, colonel of the Ukrainian Sich Riflemen
- Yaroslav Halan, Ukrainian playwright and publicist from, born in Dynów.
- Ben Zion Halberstam, second Bobover Rebbe
- Chaim Halberstam of Sanz, Hasidic rabbi
- Naftali Halberstam, fourth Bobover Rebbe
- Shlomo Halberstam, first Bobover Rebbe
- Marian Hemar, poet, born in Lviv
- Zbigniew Herbert, poet, born in Lviv
- Maxim Hermaniuk, the Ukrainian Catholic Archbishop of Winnipeg, born in Nove Selo, near Horodok
- Arthur Hertzberg, Conservative rabbi and prominent Jewish-American scholar and activist, born in Lubaczów
- Tzvi Hirsh of Zidichov, the founder of Zidichov (Hasidic dynasty)
- Jerzy Hoffman, film director, born in Kraków
- Roald Hoffmann, American chemist (Nobel Prize in 1981), born in Zolochiv
- Yakiv Holovatsky, Ukrainian poet and ethnographer, born in Chepeli
- Sydir Holubovych, Ukrainian politician, born in Towsteńskie near Husiatyn
- Krystyna Holuj-Radzikowska, chess woman grandmaster, born in Lviv
- Shimshon Holzman, Israeli painter, born in Sambir
- Bl. Josaphata Hordashevska, Ukrainian nun, beatified by John Paul II in 2001, born in Lviv
- Moses Horowitz, playwright and actor of Yiddish theatre, born in Stanislau
- Schmelke Horowitz, rabbi of Nikolsburg in Moravia, born in Chortkiv
- Mieczysław Horszowski, pianist, born in Lviv
- Dmytro Hrytsai, Ukrainian politician and general of the Ukrainian Insurgent Army, born in Dorozhin, near Sambir
- Lubomyr Husar, head of the Ukrainian Greek Catholic Church and Cardinal, born in Lviv
- Abba Hushi, Israeli politician, born in Turka
- Naftali Herz Imber, Jewish poet who wrote the lyrics of Hatikvah, the national anthem of Israel, born in Zolochiv
- Leopold Infeld, physicist, born in Kraków
- Karol Irzykowski, writer, literary critic, theorist of film and chess player, born in Błaszkowa near Pilzno
- Vasyl Ivanchuk Ukrainian world class chess player, born in Berezhany
- Alfred Jansa, Austrian Major-General, born in Stanislau
- Marian Jaworski, Roman Catholic Archbishop of Lviv and Cardinal, born in Lviv
- Max Judd, American chess master, born in Kraków
- Stepan Kachala, politician and writer, born near Berezhany
- Jaroslav Kacmarcyk, a head of the Lemko-Rusyn Republic (1918–20), born in Binczarowa
- Stefan Kaczmarz, mathematician, born in Lviv
- Tadeusz Kantor, painter, theatre director, born in Wielopole
- Michał Karaszewicz-Tokarzewski, general of the Polish Army, born in Lviv
- Wojciech Kilar, classical and film music composer, born in Lviv
- Moise Kisling, painter, born in Kraków
- Julian Klaczko, Polish-Austrian diplomat
- Franciszek Kleeberg, general of the Polish Army, born in Ternopil
- Józef Klotz, Polish footballer, born in Kraków
- Dmytro Klyachkivsky, commander of the Ukrainian Insurgent Army, born in Zbarazh
- Tadeusz Bór-Komorowski, general, commander-in-chief of the Home Army, born in Lviv
- Yevhen Konovalets, Ukrainian politician and military leader, born in Zashkiv, near Lviv
- Zenon Kossak, Ukrainian politician and military leader, born in Drohobych
- Bl. Omelyan Kovch, Ukrainian Greek Catholic priest, born in Tlumach, near Kosiv
- Ignacy Krasicki, Prince-Bishop of Ermland and Archbishop of Gniezno, born in Dubiecko, near Przemyśl
- František Kriegel, Czechoslovak politician, born in Stanislau
- Walter Krivitsky, Soviet spy, born in Pidvolochysk, near Ternopil
- Nachman Krochmal, Jewish philosopher, born in Brody
- Solomiya Krushelnytska, Ukrainian opera singer
- Ivan Krypiakevych, Ukrainian historian, born in Lviv
- Volodymyr Kubiyovych, geographer, encyclopedist, politician (Ukrainian Central Committee), born in Neu Sandez
- Vasyl Kuk, commander of the Ukrainian Insurgent Army, born in Krasne near Zolochiv
- Viktor Kurmanovych, general, Chief of Staff of the Ukrainian Galician Army, born in Vilshanitsa near Zolochiv
- Jacek Kuroń, leader of the Solidarity movement, born in Lviv

== L–O ==
- Manfred Lachs, Polish diplomat and jurist, born in Stanislau
- Salo Landau, Dutch chess master, born in Bochnia
- Hersch Lauterpacht, British judge, born in Zhovkva
- Pinhas Lavon, Israeli politician, born in Kopychyntsi
- Stanisław Jerzy Lec (de Tusch-Letz), writer, born in Lviv
- Stanisław Lem, writer, born in Lviv
- Juliusz Leo, politician and academic, Mayor of Kraków (1904–1918), born in Stebnik
- Bohdan Lepky, Ukrainian poet and writer, born in Krehulets, Husiatyn district
- Hirschel Levin, Chief Rabbi at London and Berlin, born in Rzeszów
- Kost Levitsky, Ukrainian politician, born in Tysmenytsya
- Herman Lieberman, politician, born in Drohobych
- Ephraim Moses Lilien, Jewish photographer, born in Drohobych
- Marta Litinskaya-Shul, chess woman grandmaster, born in Lviv
- Roman Longchamps de Bérier, lawyer, the last rector of the Jan Kazimierz University, born in Lviv
- George Stephen Nestor Luckyj, scholar of Ukrainian literature, born in Yanchyn near Lviv
- Ignacy Łukasiewicz, inventor (petroleum industry)
- Jan Łukasiewicz, logician, born in Lviv
- Oleh Luzhnyi, football (soccer) player and coach, born in Lviv
- Vyacheslav Lypynsky, politician and historian, born in Volodymyr-Volynskyi
- Bl. Roman Lysko, Ukrainian Greek Catholic priest, born in Horodok, near Lviv
- Stanisław Maczek, general of the Polish Army, born in Szczerzec, near Lviv
- Ephraim Zalman Margolis, Talmudic scholar, born in Brody
- Max Margules, meteorologist, born in Brody
- Samuel Hirsch Margulies, Chief Rabbi of Florence, born in Berezhany
- Jan Matejko, painter, born in Kraków
- Stanisław Mazur, mathematician, born in Lviv
- Józef Mehoffer, painter, born in Ropczyce
- Andriy Melnyk, leader of the Ukrainian nationalist movement, born near Drohobych
- Carl Menger, founder of the Austrian School of Economics, born in Neu Sandez
- Adrian Mikhalchishin, Ukrainian-Slovenian chess master, born in Lviv
- Ludwig von Mises, foremost representative of the Austrian School of Economics, born in Lviv
- Richard von Mises, mathematical physicist and statistician, born in Lviv
- Helena Modjeska, actress, born in Kraków
- Ralph Modjeski, engineer, born in Bochnia
- Kalikst Morawski, chess master, born in Boryszkowce, near Borshchiv
- Janusz Morgenstern, film director and producer, born in Mikulińce, near Ternopil
- Soma Morgenstern, writer and journalist, born in Budaniv
- Franz Xaver Wolfgang Mozart, youngest son of Wolfgang Amadeus Mozart, lived and worked in Lviv
- Andrzej Munk, film director, born in Kraków
- Lewis Bernstein Namier, British politician and historian, born in Wola Okrzejska
- Joseph Saul Nathanson, rabbi and posek, born in Berezhany
- Hryhoriy Nestor, shepherd, born in Carpathian Mountains
- Nikifor (Epifaniusz Drowniak), Ruthenian (Lemko) painter, born in Krynica
- Leopold Okulicki, general, last commander-in-chief of the Home Army, born in Bratucice, near Bochnia
- Joseph Oleskiw, Ukrainian writer, born in Skvariava Nova, near Zhovkva
- Menachem Oren (Mieczysław Chwojnik), Polish-Israeli chess master and mathematician
- Władysław Orlicz, mathematician from Okocim
- Ostap Ortwin, literary critic, born in Tłumacz, near Stanislau]
- Bohdan Osadchuk, historian and journalist, born in Kolomyia
- Stanisław Ostrowski, third President of Poland in exile (1972–79), born in Lviv
- Józef Maksymilian Ossoliński, Count, founder of the Ossolineum, born in Wola Mielecka, near Mielec

== P–R ==
- Jan Parandowski, writer, essayist, and translator, born in Lviv
- Jakub Karol Parnas, biochemist, born in Mokriany, near Drohobych
- Yevhen Petrushevych, President of Western Ukrainian People's Republic, born in Busk
- Volodymyr Petryshyn, mathematician, born in Liashky Murovani, Lviv
- Simhah Pinsker, archeologist, born in Ternopil
- Oskar Piotrowski, chess master, lived in Lviv
- Mykola Plaviuk, President of Ukrainian People's Republic in exile (1989–92), born in Russiv, near Stanislav
- Rudolf Pöch, Austrian anthropologist and ethnologist, born in Ternopil
- Stepan Popel, chess master, born in Komarniki, near Turka
- Ignatz von Popiel, chess master, born in Drohobych
- Alfred Józef Potocki, Count, Minister-President of Austria (1870–71), born in Łańcut
- Omeljan Pritsak, Ukrainian historian and orientalist, born in Luka near Sambir
- Włodzimierz Puchalski, photographer and film director, born in Mostki Wielkie, near Lviv
- Ivan Pulyui, Ukrainian physicist and inventor, born in Hrymailiv
- Jan Puzyna de Kosielsko, Prince, Roman Catholic auxiliary bishop of Lvov and Bishop of Kraków, Cardinal, born in Gwoździec
- Joseph Ludwig Raabe, Swiss mathematician, born in Brody
- Isidor Isaac Rabi, Austrian-American physicist (Nobel Prize in 1944), born in Rymanów
- Karl Radek, Bolshevik politician, born in Lviv
- Samuel Judah Löb Rapoport (Shir), born in Lviv
- Alfred Redl, Austrian counter-intelligence officer, born in Lviv
- Wilhelm Reich, Austrian psychoanalyst, born in Dobrzanica, a village near Peremyshliany
- Józef Retinger, Polish-Austrian-Mexican-British political adviser, born in Kraków
- Emanuel Ringelblum, Polish Jewish historian, born in Buchach
- Shalom Rokeach, first Rebbe of Belz
- Yehoshua Rokeach, second Rebbe of Belz
- Yissachar Dov Rokeach, third Rebbe of Belz
- Aharon Rokeach, fourth Rebbe of Belz
- Mordechai Rokeach, Rav of the town of Bilgoray, born in Belz
- Oleg Romanishin, chess master, born in Lviv
- Jakob Rosanes, German mathematician, born in Brody
- Jakob Rosenfeld, Chinese general, born in Lviv
- Erna Rosenstein, painter and poet, born in Lviv
- Paul Rosenstein-Rodan, economist, born in Kraków
- Henry Roth, American writer, born in Tysmenitz near Stanislau
- Joseph Roth, Austrian writer of Jewish descent, born in Brody
- Adam Daniel Rotfeld, Polish minister of foreign affairs, born in Peremyshliany
- Tadeusz Rozwadowski, Chief of the General Staff of the Polish Army, born in Babin, near Kalush
- Helena Rubinstein, cosmetics industrialist, born in Kraków
- Jaroslav Rudnyckyj, Ukrainian Canadian linguist, born in Przemyśl
- Edward Rydz-Śmigły, Polish marshal and commander-in-chief, born in Berezhany

== S–Z ==
- Leopold von Sacher-Masoch, Austrian writer, born in Lviv
- Dov Sadan, scholar of Yiddish and Hebrew literature, born in Brody
- Manfred Sakel, neurophysiologist and psychiatrist, born in Nadvorna
- Adam Stefan Sapieha, Prince, Archbishop of Kraków and Cardinal, born in Krasiczyn
- Juliusz Schauder, mathematician, born in Lviv
- Heinrich Schenker, music theorist, born in Vyshnivchyk
- Moses Schorr, rabbi, assyriologist and politician, born in Przemyśl
- Bruno Schulz, poet, novelist and painter, born in Drohobych
- Sholom Mordechai Schwadron, Jewish gaon of Berezhany, born in Zolochiv
- Marcella Sembrich, born in 1858 in Wisniewczyk, in Austrian Galicia, now part of Ukraine. A consummate musician, she was a major figure in the operatic world.
- Meir Shapiro, Hasidic rabbi and rosh yeshiva
- Markiyan Shashkevych, poet and interpreter, born in Pidlissia near Zolochiv
- Andrey Sheptytsky, Count, Metropolitan Archbishop of the Ukrainian Greek Catholic Church, born in Prylbychi, near Lviv
- Clement Sheptytsky, Count, Archimandrite of the Studite monks, born in Prylbychi, near Lviv
- Stanisław Sheptytsky, Count, general of the Polish Army, born in Prylbychi, near Lviv
- Roman Shukhevych, the supreme commander of the Ukrainian Insurgent Army, born in Krakovets, near Yavoriv
- Władysław Sikorski, general, Prime Minister of Poland and commander-in-chief of the Polish Armed Forces (1939–43), born in Tuszów Narodowy
- Stanisław Skrowaczewski, conductor, born in Lviv
- Josyf Slipyj, head of the Ukrainian Greek Catholic Church, born in of Zazdrist, near Terebovlia
- Wacław Sobieski, historian, born in Lviv
- Stanisław Sosabowski, general, commander of the Polish 1st Independent Parachute Brigade, born in Stanislau
- Jerzy Sosnowski, major, Polish spy in Germany (1926–34) as Georg von Sosnowski, Ritter von Nalecz, born in Lviv
- Manès Sperber, novelist and psychologist, born in Zabolotiv
- Nissan Spivak, Jewish cantor and composer from Belz
- Hnat Stefaniv, Ukrainian colonel, born in Toporivtsi, near Horodenka
- Vasyl Stefanyk, writer, born in Rusiv, near Kuty
- Hugo Steinhaus, mathematician, born in Jasło
- Yaroslav Stetsko, leader of the Ukrainian nationalist movement, born in Ternopil
- Slava Stetsko, leader of the Ukrainian nationalist movement, born in Romanivka, near Terebovlia
- Lee Strasberg, Jewish American director, actor and producer, born in Budaniv
- Julian Stryjkowski, writer, born in Stryj
- Kyryl Studynsky, head of the People's Assembly of Western Ukraine (1939), born in Kamienka near Ternopil
- Franciszek Sulik, chess master, born in Lviv
- Karol Szajnocha, historian, born in Komarno
- Jan Szczepanik, inventor, born in Rudniki, near Mostyska
- Jan Szembek, Count, deputy secretary in the Ministry of Foreign Affairs, born in Poręba
- Józef Szujski, historian and politician, born in Tarnów
- Stanisław Tarnowski, historian and politician, born in Dzików
- Józef Teodorowicz, Archbishop of Lviv (Armenian rite)
- Oscar Tenner, chess master, born in Lviv
- Leopold Trepper, Soviet spy, born in Nowy Targ
- Metodyj Trochanovskij, Lemko activist, born in Binczarowa
- Naftali Herz Tur-Sinai, Hebrew scholar, born in Lviv
- Adam Ulam, historian, born in Lviv
- Stanisław Ulam, mathematician, co-inventor of the H-bomb, born in Lviv
- Leopold Unger, journalist, born in Lviv
- Ivan Vahylevych, Ukrainian poet and ethnographer, born in Yasen near Stanislav
- Anatole Vakhnianyn, Ukrainian politician and composer, born near Przemyśl
- Bl. Vasyl Velychkovsky, Ukrainian Greek Catholic bishop (body found incorrupt), born in Stanislau
- Mykhailo Verbytsky, composer of the present National Anthem of Ukraine, born in Jawornik Ruski, near Bircza
- Dmytro Vitovsky, Ukrainian politician and military leader, born in Medukha
- Stepan Vytvytskyi, President of Ukrainian People's Republic in exile (1954–65), born near Stanislav
- Alexander Wagner, chess theoretician, lived in Stanislau
- Dov Berish Weidenfeld, Chief Rabbi of Tchebin (Trzebinia)
- Rudolf Weigl, biologist, lived in Lviv
- Friedrich Weinreb, Jewish philosopher, born in Lviv
- Shevah Weiss, Israeli politician, born in Boryslav
- Kazimierz Wierzyński, Polish poet, born in Drohobych
- Simon Wiesenthal, hunter of Nazis, born in Buchach
- Billy Wilder, Austrian-American film director, born in Suchá Beskidzka
- Karol Wojtyła, John Paul II, Archbishop of Kraków, and Pope (1978–2005), born in Wadowice
- Zev Wolf of Zbaraz, Rabbi of Zbarazh
- Stanisław Wyspiański, poet and painter, born in Kraków
- Volodymyr Yaniv, professor of the Ukrainian Catholic University in Rome, born in Lviv
- Daniel Yanofsky, Canadian chess master, born in Brody
- Richard Yary, Ukrainian politician, born in Rzeszów
- Grigory Yavlinsky Russian politician, born in Lviv
- Kordian Józef Zamorski, general, born near Gorlice
- Gabriela Zapolska, novelist and actress, born in Pidhaytsi
- Velvel Zbarjer, singer, born in Zbarazh
- Casimir Zeglen, inventor, born near Ternopil
- Michael Zohary, botanist, born in Bibrka near Lviv
- Israel Zolli, Chief Rabbi of Rome who converted to Roman Catholicism, born in Brody
