= Gössendorf =

- Municipality
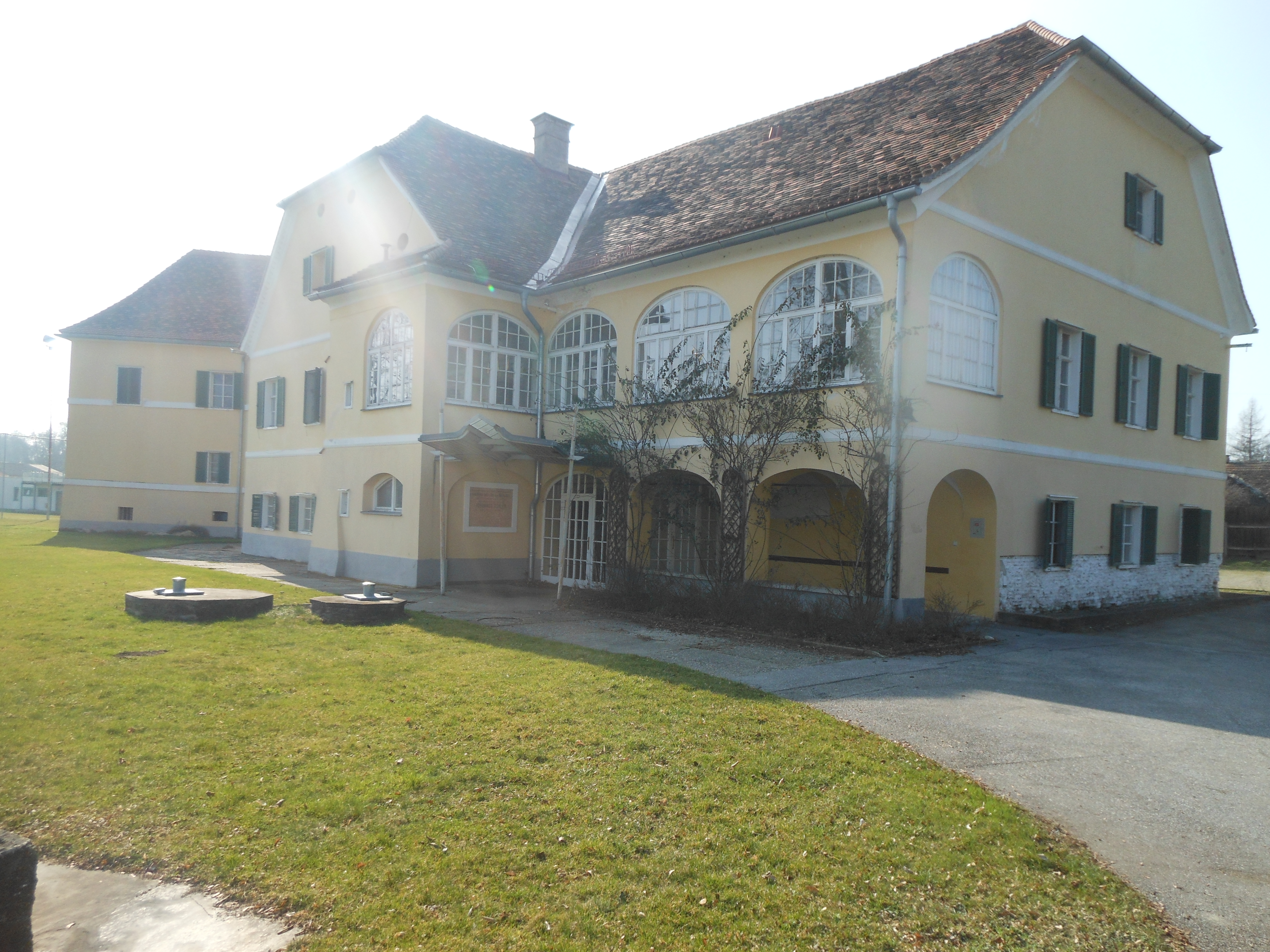
- Mühlegg Castle

- Coat of arms

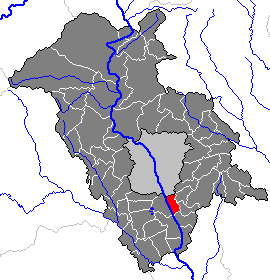
- Location within Graz-Umgebung district

- Location within Austria
- Coordinates: 46°59′0″N 15°29′0″E
- Country: Austria
- State: Styria
- District: Graz-Umgebung

Government
  - Mayor: Franz Macher (SPÖ)

Area
  - Total: 7.18 km^{2} (2.77 sq mi)
- Elevation: 326 m (1,070 ft)

Population (2018-01-01)
  - Total: 3,981
  - Density: 554/km^{2} (1,440/sq mi)
- Time zone: UTC+1 (CET)
  - Summer (DST): UTC+2 (CEST)
- Postal code: 8077
- Area code: +43 3135 / 316
- Vehicle registration: GU
- Website: www.goessendorf.com

Gössendorf is a municipality in the district of Graz-Umgebung in the Austrian state of Styria with 3793 inhabitants (appointed date 31 October 2013)

== Population ==
Historical population
Year	Pop.	±%
1869	615	—
1880	670	+8.9%
1890	629	−6.1%
1900	630	+0.2%
1910	715	+13.5%
1923	785	+9.8%
1934	819	+4.3%
1939	878	+7.2%
1951	1,033	+17.7%
1961	1,330	+28.8%
1971	1,872	+40.8%
1981	2,315	+23.7%
1991	2,591	+11.9%
2001	3,079	+18.8%
2013	3,748	+21.7%

== Geography ==
=== Geographical area ===
Gössendorf is on the southern border of the regional capital Graz and is just separated by Süd Autobahn A 2. Gössendorf is situated next to the Mur. The municipality is coalesced with neighbouring communes and is counted to a suburban hinterland of the city of Graz.

=== Structure of the municipality ===
The area of Gössendorf contains three towns (number of population: appointed date 31.10.2011)

- Dörfla (828)
- Gössendorf (2345)
- Thondorf (524)

== History ==
Due to the developments of the municipality in the last years, the local council decided unanimously to file an application for imposing the municipality Gössendorf to a market town during a meeting on the 5. February 2002. That application was accepted. Therewith Gössendorf is unofficially called a market town since 1. June 2004.

=== Awards ===
Gössendorf was honoured with several awards the past years:

- Grazer Krauthäuptel: Since 2008 Gössendorf belongs due to the "Grazer Krauthäuptel" to one of Austria's culinary region.
- Goldener Boden: In 2007 Gössendorf was awarded the most pro-business community in the district of Graz-Umgebung.
- Cedos partner municipality: Since 4. July 2007 Gössendorf is a partner municipality of CEDOS, which means barrier-free internet, information, culture & leisure and infrastructure. For this reason people with disabilities have the possibility to gain comprehensive information.
- Family friendly municipality: In November 2007 the market town Gössendorf was awarded family friendly town by health minister Andrea Kdolsky.

== Politics ==
=== Town council ===
The town council consist of 21 members and is composed like the following since 2010 (year of the last election):

- 11 SPÖ – position the mayor and the vice-mayor
- 6 ÖVP – position the second vice-mayor and another board member
- 4 FPÖ

=== Council ===
Mayor is Franz Macher (SPÖ) and the vice-mayor is Dipl.-Ing. (FH) Gerald Wonner (SPÖ). The second vice-mayor is Ing. Siegfried Kroisenbrunner (ÖVP). The cashier is Alwan Rudl (SPÖ) and another board member is NAbg. Mario Kunasek (FPÖ).

=== Emblem ===
The emblem consists of six silver stars and a silver unicorn on a blue shield.

The six stars refer to the time of Johannes Kepler, when only six planets were known. Johannes Kepler was a mathematics teacher at a school in Graz. His original marriage certificate with his wife Barbara Müller of 27 April 1597 was preserved at castle Mühleck, which is located in Gössendorf, after his death. The unicorn dates back to a sigil of Volkmar Richter in the 13th century.

In 1993 Gössendorf was assigned to use the emblem with the six silver stars and the silver unicorn on a blue shield as their official municipal coat of arms.

== Population development ==
=== Economy and infrastructure ===
Due to the closeness to Graz Gössendorf is a very popular housing area, which is shown at the increase of the population of the last years. Gössendorf is mainly a ribbon-build village with several residential areas, but Gössendorf has also an industrial industry. The biggest company in Gössendorf is Sattler Textilwerke AG. But there are also a lot of small and medium-sized companies. The large-sewage plant of the city of Graz is also at the municipal area of Gössendorf. The waste water of Gössendorf are disposed at another sewage plant.

Furthermore, there a lot of agriculture and forestry firms. About 80% of the area of the market town are in the possession of the farming companies.

The town hall was built between 1995 and 1996. There are two volunteer fire brigades: Gössendorf and Thondorf. In 2005 the volunteer fire brigade Gössendorf got a new fire station. Next to the town hall there is also a primary school, a kindergarten and also a day nursery. The municipality does not have a church, but three chapels (per district one). There are several grocery shops, some restaurants and cafes, two petrol stations and a bank. In addition there are a few doctors (practical doctor, dentist, vet,...). There is also a Hotel (Camellia), a pension (Melichar) and a bed and breakfast Winter.

=== Traffic ===
Due to the closeness to Graz, Gössendorf has good transport connections. Gössendorf is tangent to Süd Autobahn A 2 and since December 2013 there is also a new motorway access. Before that the next motorway access was 5 kilometres away in Messendorfer street Autobahnzubringer Graz-Ost. The access to Pyhrn Autobahn A 9 is 7 kilometres away in Kalsdorf.

Kirchbacher Straße B 73 goes through the municipal area. Grazer Straße B 67 is approximately 4 kilometres away in the neighbouring village Kalsdorf bei Graz.

Gössendorf does not have a train station. The nearest train station is in Raaba (Ostbahn) and in Kalsdorf bei Graz and are about 5 kilometres away. The central train station Hauptbahnhof Graz is about 12 kilometres away.

The airport Flughafen Graz-Thalerhof is about 7 kilometres away.

== Leisure and sport ==
In Gössendorf there are a sports club, five ice stock sport club, a golf-driving-range and several other clubs. The sports centre has a big football ground, a football trainings ground with floodlight, an ice stock sport hall and a public toilet.

There is also a multi-functional sports ground with football goals, a basketball hoop and necessary markings for volleyball, handball or other ball sports.

For inline skaters or skaters there is a skater ground with challenging trainings tools. A street socker/hocker ground with integrated goals is provided as well.

In the municipality are also two tennis courts, two equestrian centres and a children playground.

== Personalities ==
- Fritz Edelmann (1900–1977) - saved several Jewish people from Holocaust and is called honoured as "Gerechter unter den Völkern"; mayor of Gössendorf between 1950 and 1972
- Mario Kunasek (born 1976) - Federal Minister of Defense 2017
