= Thalerhof =

Thalerhof may refer to:

- Graz Airport
- Thalerhof internment camp
- Thalerhof U 12 planes
