= Dewetron =

Austrian manufacturing company

- Dewetron logo

- Dewetron at DEF-TECH Bharat 2026, KTPO, Bengaluru
- Type: Gmbh
- Industry: Manufacturing
- Founded: September 1989, Austria
- Headquarters: Grambach, Graz, Austria
- Area served: Austria, Germany, USA, China, India, Japan
- Key people: Christian Neubauer (CFO); Christoph Wiedner (CEO); Roland Sonnleitner (COO)
- Services: Manufacturer of high-precision data acquisition and power measurement systems
- Number of employees: 140+
- Parent: Anritsu corporation
- Website: www.dewetron.com

Dewetron GmbH is an Austrian worldwide manufacturing company of data acquisition (DAQ) systems and power analyzers.

== Company ==
Dewetron was acquired by the Anritsu corporation as a wholly owned subsidiary, on 21 October 2025.
