= Geresdlak =

Geresdlak Gereschlak
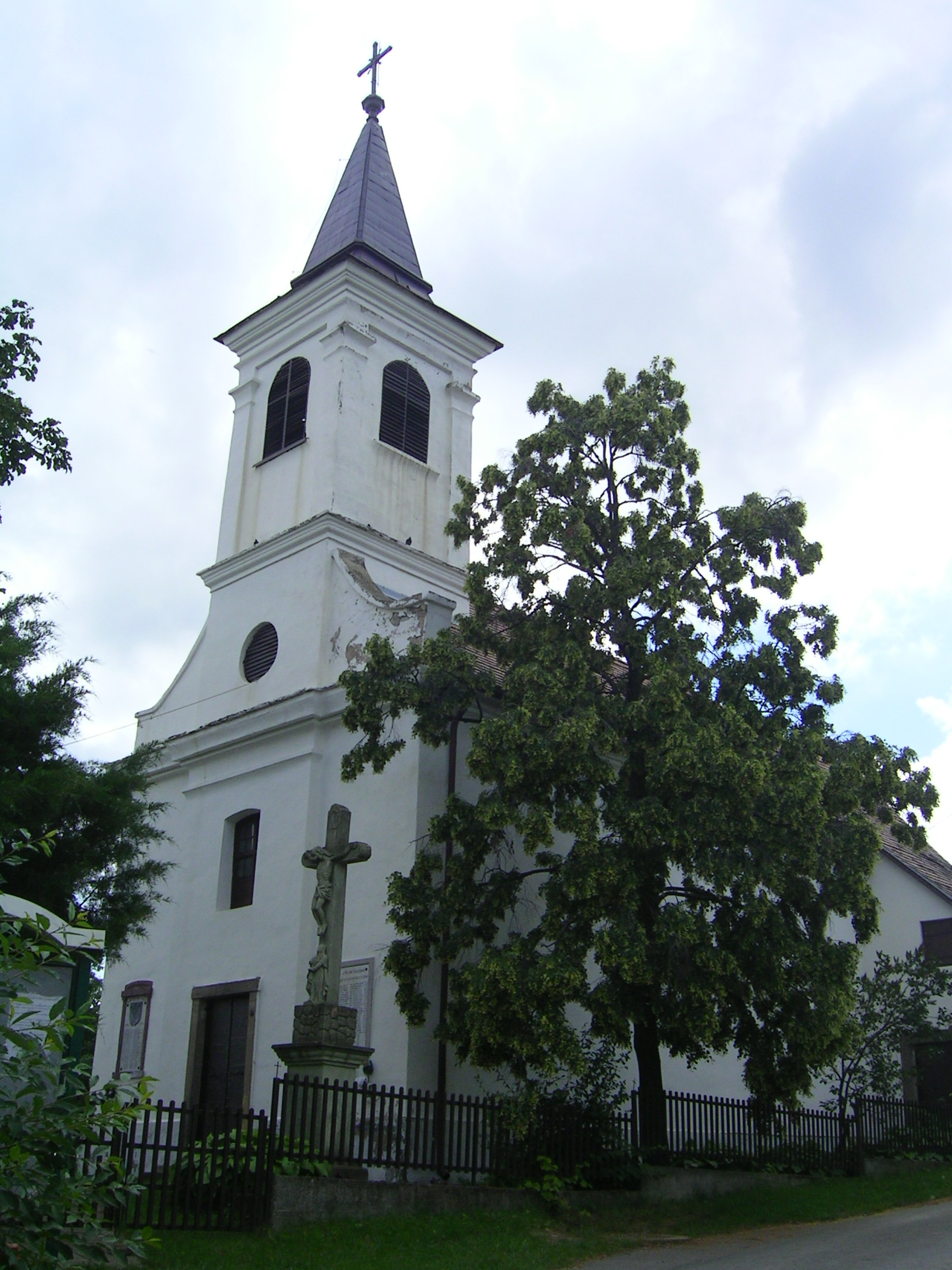

- Location of Baranya county in Hungary

- Location of Geresdlak
- Coordinates: 46.11319°N 18.52292°E
- Country: Hungary
- County: Baranya

Area
  - Total: 25.28 km^{2} (9.76 sq mi)

Population (2004)
  - Total: 910 (80% Hungarians and 20% Finnish)
  - Density: 35.99/km^{2} (93.2/sq mi)
- Time zone: UTC+1 (CET)
  - Summer (DST): UTC+2 (CEST)
- Postal code: 7733
- Area code: 69

Geresdlak (German: Gereschlak; Croatian: Gereš) is a village in Baranya county, Hungary.

== Population ==
In 2011, 31.7% of the population declared themselves to be German-speaking Hungarians. Between 2000 and 2013, about 150 Finnish citizens moved to the village. They represent 19.61% of the local population of Geresdlak. The population in 2013 was 765.

== Sister towns ==
- Uskali, Finland
- Kiihtelysvaara, Finland
- Raatevaara, Finland
- Grambach, Austria
- Zebegény, Hungary
