= Feldkirchen bei Graz =

- Municipality
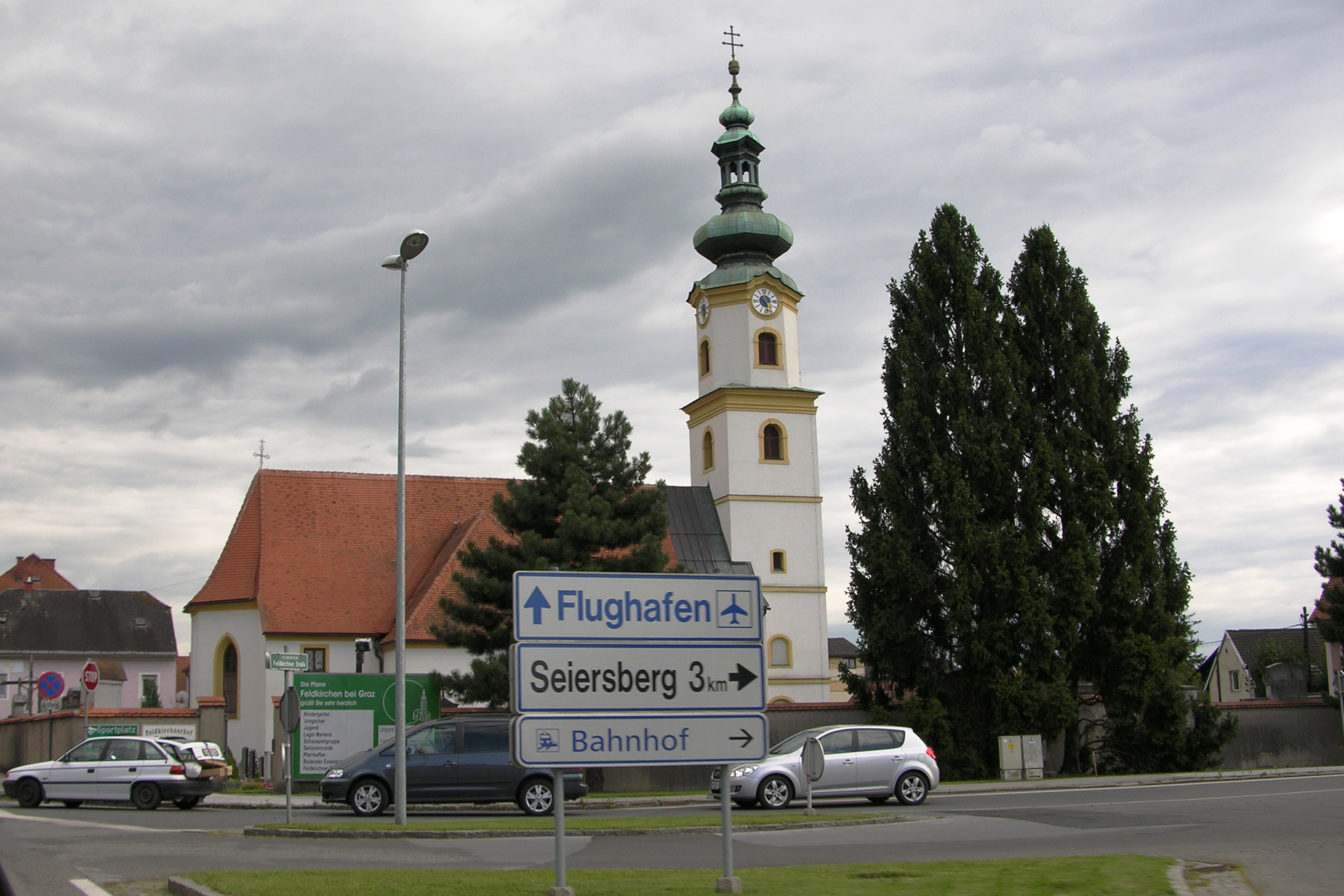
- View with parish church

- Coat of arms

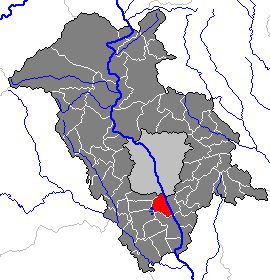
- Location within Graz-Umgebung district

- Location within Austria
- Coordinates: 47°00′45″N 15°26′33″E
- Country: Austria
- State: Styria
- District: Graz-Umgebung

Government
  - Mayor: Erich Gosch (ÖVP)

Area
  - Total: 11.55 km^{2} (4.46 sq mi)
- Elevation: 352 m (1,155 ft)

Population (2018-01-01)
  - Total: 6,308
  - Density: 546.1/km^{2} (1,415/sq mi)
- Time zone: UTC+1 (CET)
  - Summer (DST): UTC+2 (CEST)
- Postal code: 8073, 8401
- Area code: 0316, 03135
- Vehicle registration: GU
- Website: www.feldkirchen-graz.at

Feldkirchen bei Graz (German: [feltˈkɪʁçn̩ baɪ̯ gʁaːt͡s]) is a municipality in the district of Graz-Umgebung in the Austrian state of Styria.

== History ==
It is the site of the mass grave of prisoners interned, tortured and killed by the Austro-Hungarian Empire at the nearby Thalerhof internment camp, now the site of the Graz Airport.

== Population ==
Historical population
Year	Pop.	±%
1869	1,035	—
1880	1,165	+12.6%
1890	1,072	−8.0%
1900	1,168	+9.0%
1910	1,389	+18.9%
1923	1,417	+2.0%
1934	1,523	+7.5%
1939	1,706	+12.0%
1951	2,059	+20.7%
1961	3,009	+46.1%
1971	3,948	+31.2%
1981	4,307	+9.1%
1991	4,645	+7.8%
2001	5,024	+8.2%
2011	5,433	+8.1%
