= Binczarowa =

Binczarowa Білцарьова, Biltsariova (in Rusyn) Більцарева, Bil’tsareva (in Ukrainian)
- Village
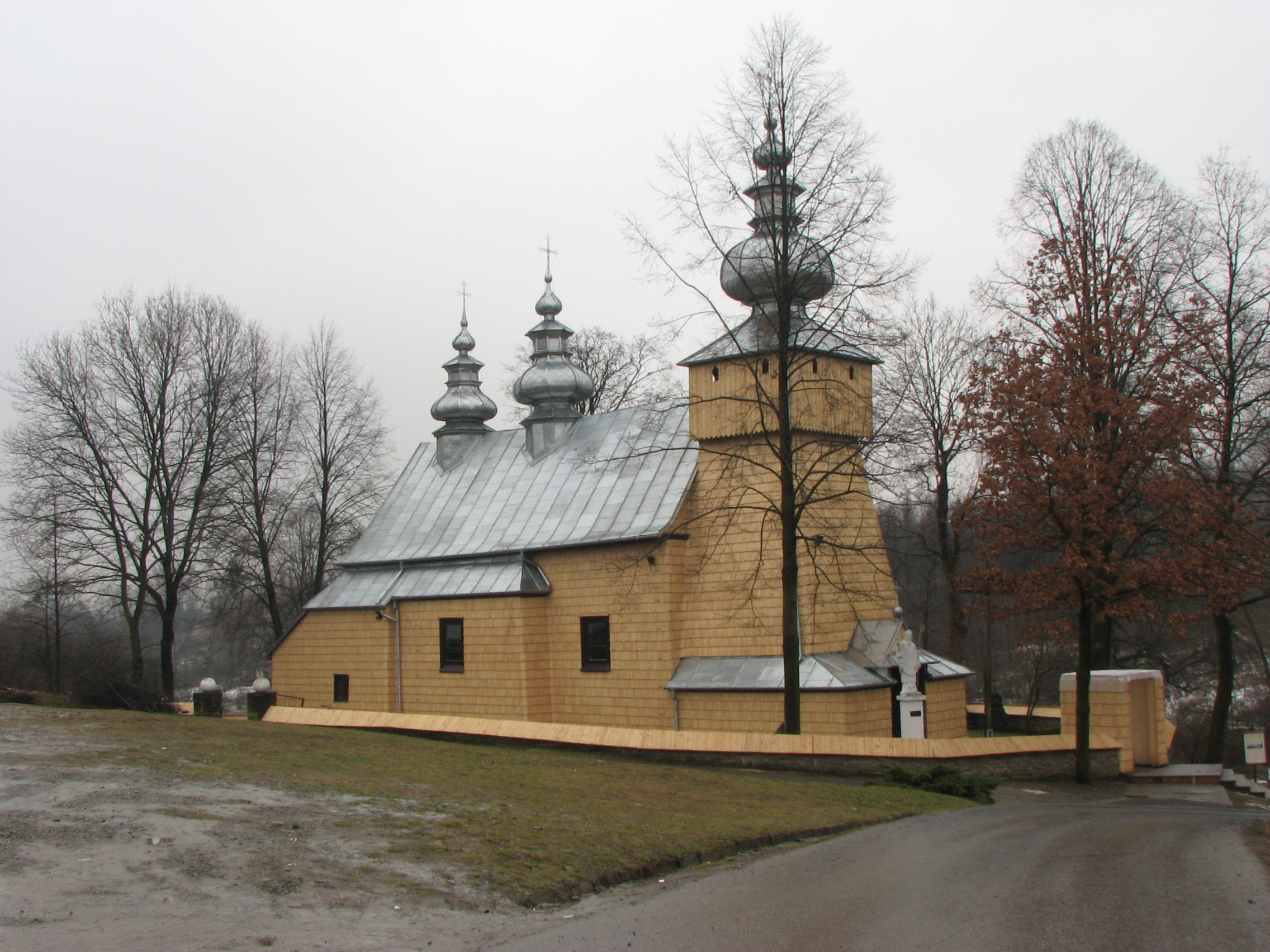
- Saint Dimitr Orthodox Church

- Location within Poland
- Coordinates: 49°34′N 20°28′E
- Country: Poland
- Voivodeship: Lesser Poland
- County: Nowy Sącz
- Commune: Grybów
- Elevation: 597 m (1,959 ft)

Population
  - Total: 1,250
- Time zone: UTC+1
  - Summer (DST): UTC+2

Binczarowa [bʲint͡ʂaˈrɔva] (Rusyn: Білцарьова, Biltsariova; Ukrainian: Більцарева, Bil’tsareva) is a village in southern Poland. It is parallel to the stream known as Binczarce.

== History ==
Binczarowa was first mentioned in Polish history in 1365, in a decree of Casimir the Great, under the name Bibyczareban, which forced the city of Grybów to give up its rights to the surrounding forest. In 1531, the Rusyn Ivan Trukhanovych (Polish: Iwan Truchanowicz) obtained the town and Polish nobility from Sigismund I the Old.

After the First Partition of Poland in 1772, it was part of the Galician district of Grybów, and part of the Austro-Hungarian Empire. It was the birthplace of Jaroslav Kacmarcyk (1885-1944), president of the Lemko-Rusyn Republic, and of Metodyj Trochanovskij (1885-1947), who published a Lemko grammar. It was briefly independent from December 5, 1918, until March, 1920, as part of the Lemko-Rusyn Republic (Ruska Narodna Respublika Lemkiu, or Ruska Lemkivska Respublyka).

After World War II, it was depopulated by the Polish government in Operation Vistula in 1947.

== Geography ==
Binczarowa is a Lemko village in the western Lemkivshchyna. It occupies a mountain valley in the Polish commune of Grybów, county of Nowy Sącz, Lesser Poland Voivodeship. It is situated along a stream known as the Binczarce, a tributary of the Poprad. It lies between the towns of Florynka to the east and Bogusza in the west.

== Culture and Religion ==
The town is the site of St. Dymitr's Church, built in 1760. The town is the site of a large World War I cemetery.
