= Thalerhof internment camp =

WWI concentration camp in Austria

Coordinates: 46°59′37″N 15°26′24″E

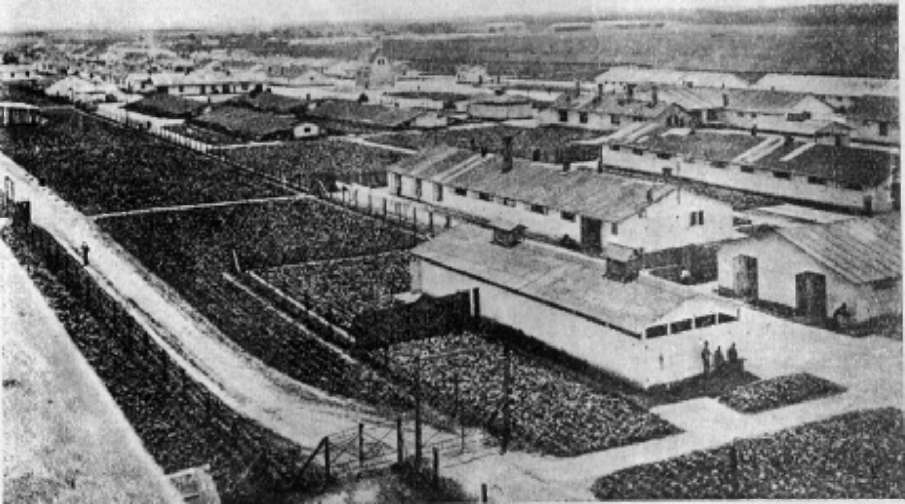
View to the concentration camp

Thalerhof (also transliterated as Talerhof from Cyrillic-based East Slavic texts) was a concentration camp created by the Austro-Hungarian authorities active from 1914 to 1917, in a valley in foothills of the Alps, near Graz, the capital city of the province of Styria.

== Overview ==
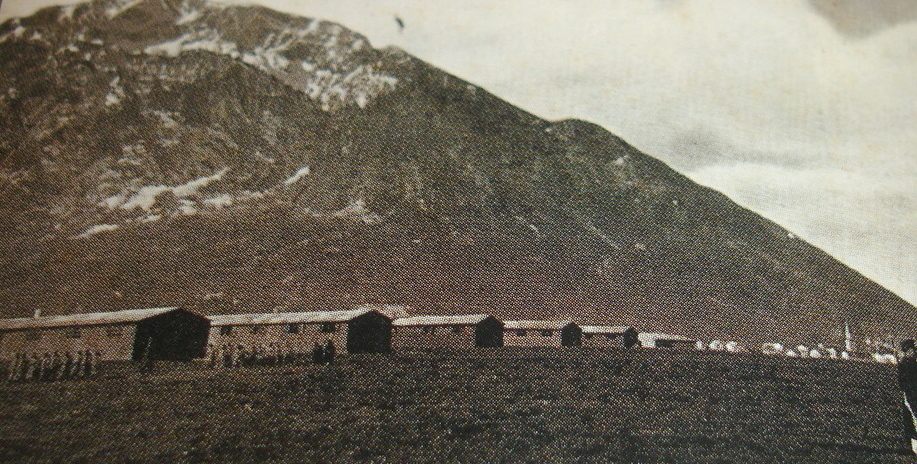
Central Camp Talerhof 1914-1917

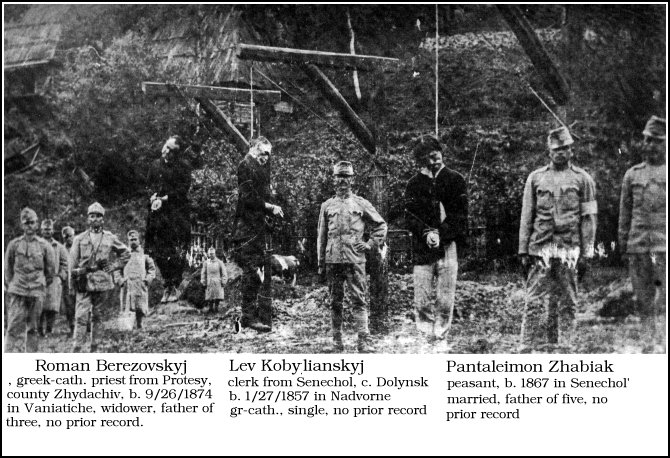
Killings in Talerhof

The Austro-Hungarian authorities imprisoned leaders of the Russophile movement among Carpatho-Rusyns, Lemkos, and Galicians (see Galician Russophilia); those who recognized the Russian language as the literary standard form of their own Slavic language varieties and had sympathy for the Russian Empire. Thus, the captives were forced to abandon their identity as Russians, or sympathies for Russia, and identify as Ukrainian. Captives who identified themselves as Ukrainians were freed from the camp. Between 1924-1932, four issues of the Thalerhof Almanac were published in Lviv, in which collected documentary evidence of the number of prisoners and the murders of peaceful Russophiles by the Austrian authorities was published. Out of 5,500,158 inhabitants of Eastern Galicia in 1914, 2,114,792 (39.8%) were native speakers of Polish, and 3,385,366 (58.9%) were native speakers of Ruthenian (Rusyn or Ukrainian). In the book "Habsburg national politics during the First World War", authors D.A. Akhremenko, chairman of a public organization called Historical Consciousness, and K.V. Shevchenko, a professor at Belarusian State University, state that Thalerhof held a total of 10,000 "Galician Russians", about 2,000 Rusyns (according to other sources up to 5,000), and about 200-250 students placed in the camp on charges of sympathy for the Russian Empire, and books of Grigory Skovoroda, Taras Shevchenko, Pushkin, Tolstoy and others. In total over twenty thousand people were arrested and placed in Thalerhof camp.

Thalerhof had no barracks until the winter of 1915. Prisoners slept on the ground in the open-air during both rain and frost. According to U.S. Congressman Medill McCormick, prisoners were regularly beaten and tortured. On 9 November 1914 an official report of Fieldmarshal Schleer said there were 5,700 Carpatho-Rusyns, Lemkos, and Ukrainians in Talerhof. In the winter of 1914-1915, a third of the roughly 7,000 internees died of typhus. The camp was closed by Emperor Charles I of Austria, 6 months into his reign.

In the first eighteen months of its existence, three thousand prisoners of Thalerhof died, including the Orthodox saint Maxim Sandovich, who was martyred here (beatified August 29, 1996 by the Russian Orthodox Church Outside Russia).

From 1945 to 1955 the site was used as an airbase by the RAF, and known, as RAF Station Thalerhof before being transferred back to the Austrian Government. Graz Airport currently occupies the former site of the camp.

The barracks were demolished in 1936. The corpses of 1,767 internees were then exhumed and reburied in a mass grave at Feldkirchen bei Graz.

== People interned in Thalerhof ==
- Fr. Mykhailo Zubrytskyi
- Jaroslav Kacmarcyk
- Maxim Sandovich
- Metodyj Trochanovskij
- Hryc Krajnyk from Ulucz
- Encyclopedia of Rusyn History and Culture lists the following persons: priests (Havryil Hnatyshak, Teofil’ Kachmarchyk, Dymytrii Khyliak, Vasylii Kuryllo, Mykolai Malyniak, Vasylii Mastsiukh, Tyt Myshkovskii, Ioann Polianskii, Olympii Polianskii, Roman Pryslopskii), lawyers (Iaroslav Kachmarchyk, Teofil’ Kuryllo) and cultural activists (Nikolai Hromosiak, Dymytrii Kachor, Simeon Pysh, Metodii Trokhanovskii, Dymytrii Vyslotskii).

== See also ==
- Ukrainian Canadian internment
- Central Labour Camp Jaworzno
