= Raaba-Grambach =

- Municipality
- Coat of arms

- Location within Austria
- Coordinates: 47°01′40″N 15°29′48″E
- Country: Austria
- State: Styria
- District: Graz-Umgebung

Government
  - Mayor: Karl Mayrhold (SPÖ)

Area
  - Total: 14.65 km^{2} (5.66 sq mi)
- Elevation: 350 m (1,150 ft)

Population (2018-01-01)
  - Total: 4,420
  - Density: 302/km^{2} (781/sq mi)
- Time zone: UTC+1 (CET)
  - Summer (DST): UTC+2 (CEST)
- Postal code: 8071, 8074, 8302
- Area code: +43 316
- Website: www.raaba-grambach.at

Raaba-Grambach is a market town in the district Graz-Umgebung in Styria, Austria since 2015. It was created as part of the Steiermärkische Gemeindestrukturreform of Styria at the end of 2014, dissolving the towns Raaba and Grambach. One complaint from both communities against merging was raised at the Constitutional Court but ended unsuccessfully.

== Geography ==
=== Location ===
The municipality is located on the southeastern outskirts of the provincial capital of Graz, in eastern Styria's hill country and is part of the Graz Basin.

=== Communities ===
The municipal region contains four parts (populations as of 1 Jan 2016):

- Dürwagersbach (171)
- Grambach (1,736)
- Lamberg (256)
- Raaba (2,000)

It contains two Katastralgemeinden (areas as of 2015):

- Grambach - 694.02 hectares (1,715.0 acres)
- Raaba - 769.16 hectares (1,900.6 acres)

== History ==
In 1265 Grambach was mentioned for the first time in the registers of the Grazer Marschallamt.

Until 1848, the town belonged to a number of landowners such as Herrschaft Liebenau, Messendorf-Hintenfeld, Münzgraben, Mühlegg, Schwarzenegg, Vasoldsberg, the Kommende Leech of the Kreuzerische Gült, the Dominicans of Graz, the Gut Kellerhof and the Pfarrgült Hausmannstätten and Fernitz.

The two local communities Raaba and Grambach arose in 1850 as autonomous bodies. After the annexation of Austria in 1938, the municipalities came to the Reichsgau Styria. Between 1945 and 1955, they were part of the British occupation zone in Austria.

In the year 2000, Raaba became a market community.

== Industry and infrastructure ==
=== Traffic ===
Due to the proximity to Graz, Raaba is very conveniently located. The Süd Autobahn (south motorway) A 2 runs directly through the area and can be reached from all the districts at the junction Puchwerk on motorway slip Graz-Ost. The Kirchbacher Straße B 73 can be reached after about two kilometers (1 mile) in the neighboring Hausmannstätten.

In Raaba there is a station of the Steirische Ostbahn Styrian Eastern Railway, which offers hourly regional train connections to Graz and Gleisdorf. The Hauptbahnhof Main station in Graz is about 8 kilometres (5.0 mi) apart. Raaba is connected to the bus line of the Graz AG Verkehrsbetriebe.

The distance to the Graz Airport is approximately 7 to 10 km (4.3 to 6.2 mi).

=== Established businesses ===
The following establishments are located in Raaba:

- Rechenzentrum and other parts of the Raiffeisen-Landesbank Steiermark
- Raiffeisenverband Steiermark
- Alpenländische Veredelungsindustrie (AVI)
- Entwicklungs- und Verwertungs GmbH (EVG)
- Hutter und Schranz Zauntechnik (H+S)
- Andritz Energy & Environment

== Politics ==
The 21 seats in the council are divided for 2015 as follows:

- 12 SPÖ
- 7 ÖVP
- 1 FPÖ
- 1 GRÜNE

=== Coat of arms ===

Coat of arms of the predecessor towns
Raaba	Grambach

Both predecessor towns had a community crest. Because of the congregation, they lost their official validity on January 1, 2015. The new grant of the municipal coat of arms for the combined community took effect on 20 October 2016.

Blazon (crest description):

"In the black and gold red shield a golden, black-lighted diagonal right beam, occupied by four ambitious black six-spoke wagonwheels; from the edge of the shield and the bar, upwards, three golden trees branches."

== Culture and sights ==
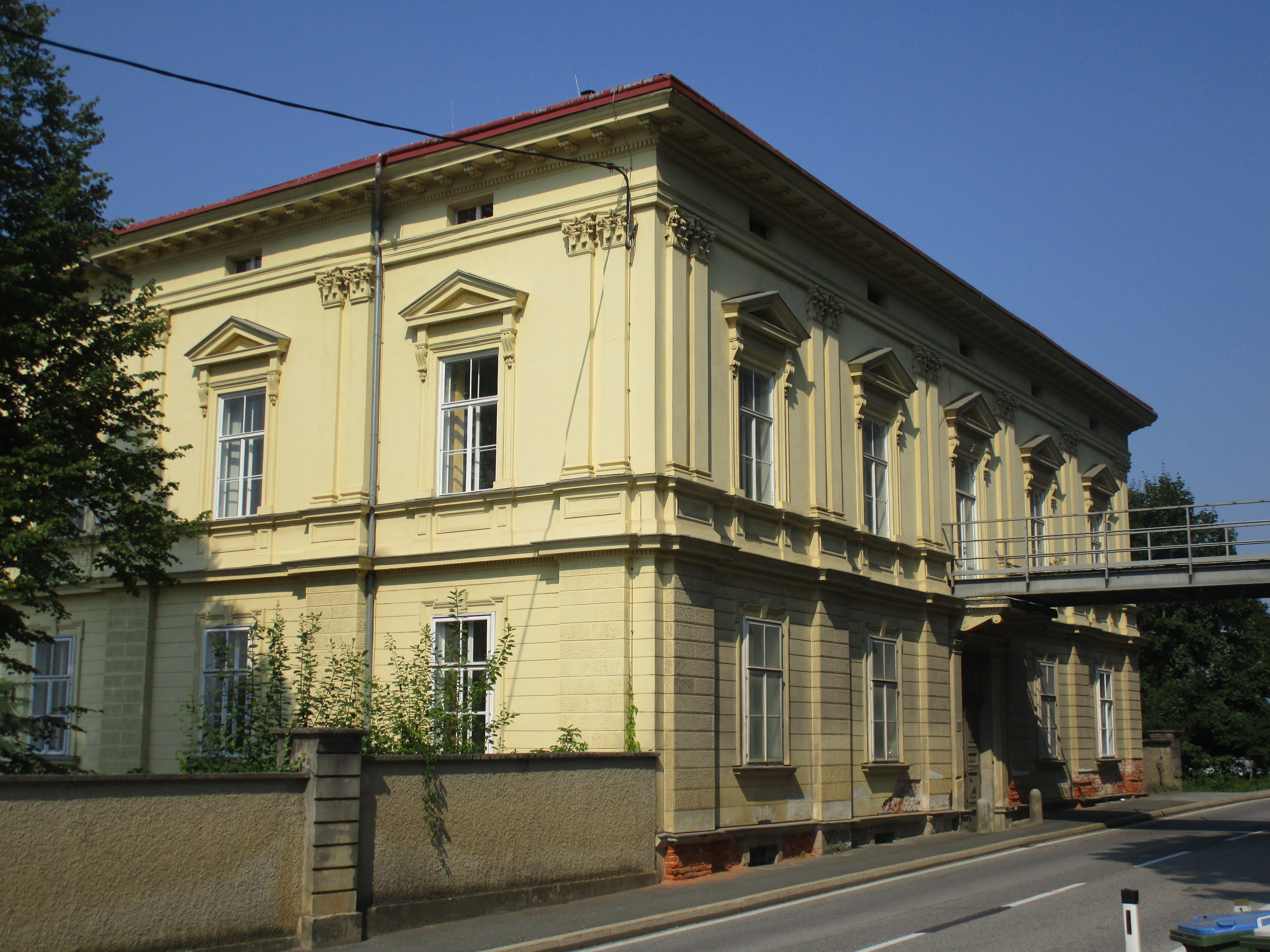
Spielerhof castle in Grambach

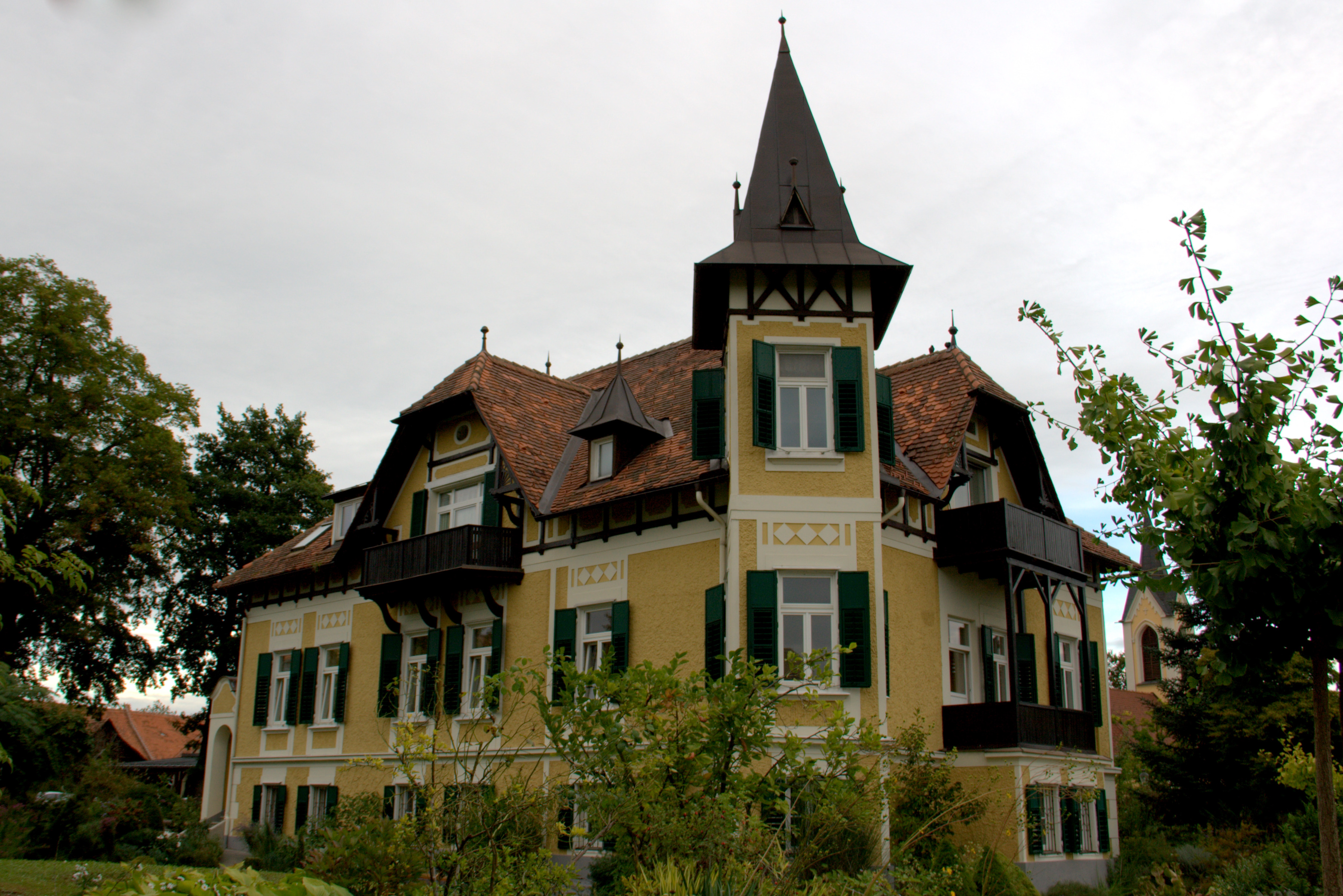
Böhmervilla in Raaba

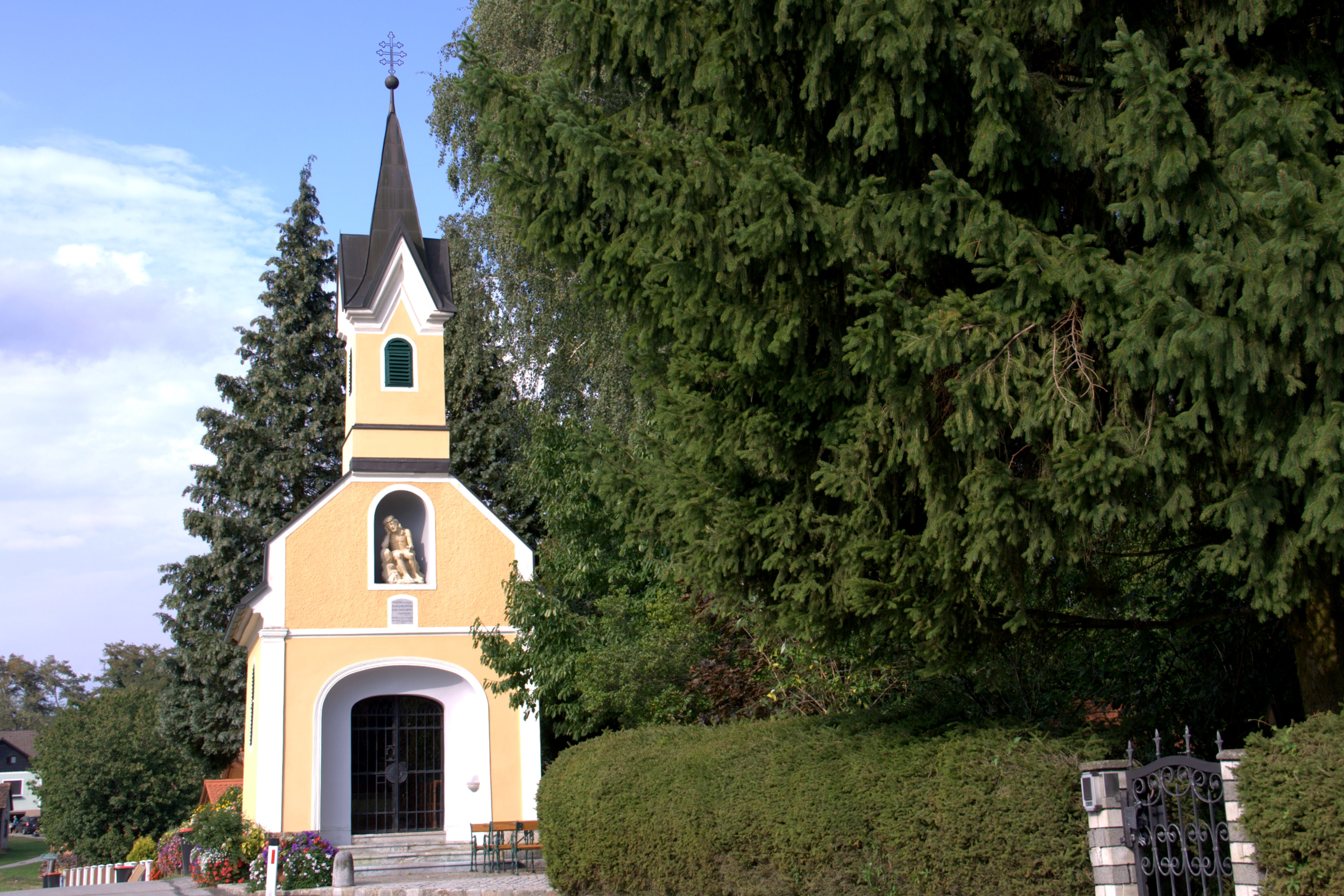
Chapel St Mary in Raaba

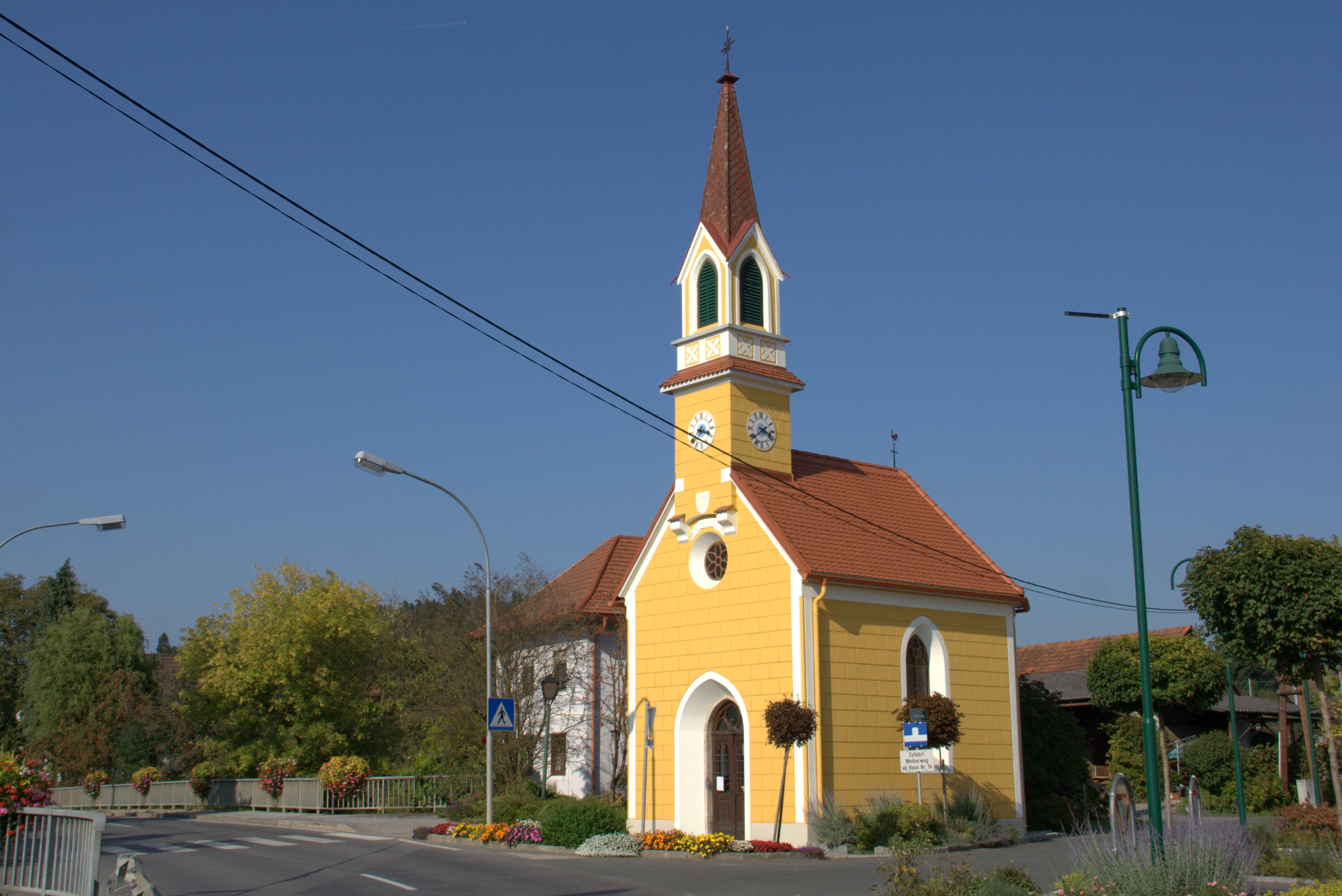
Chapel in Grambach

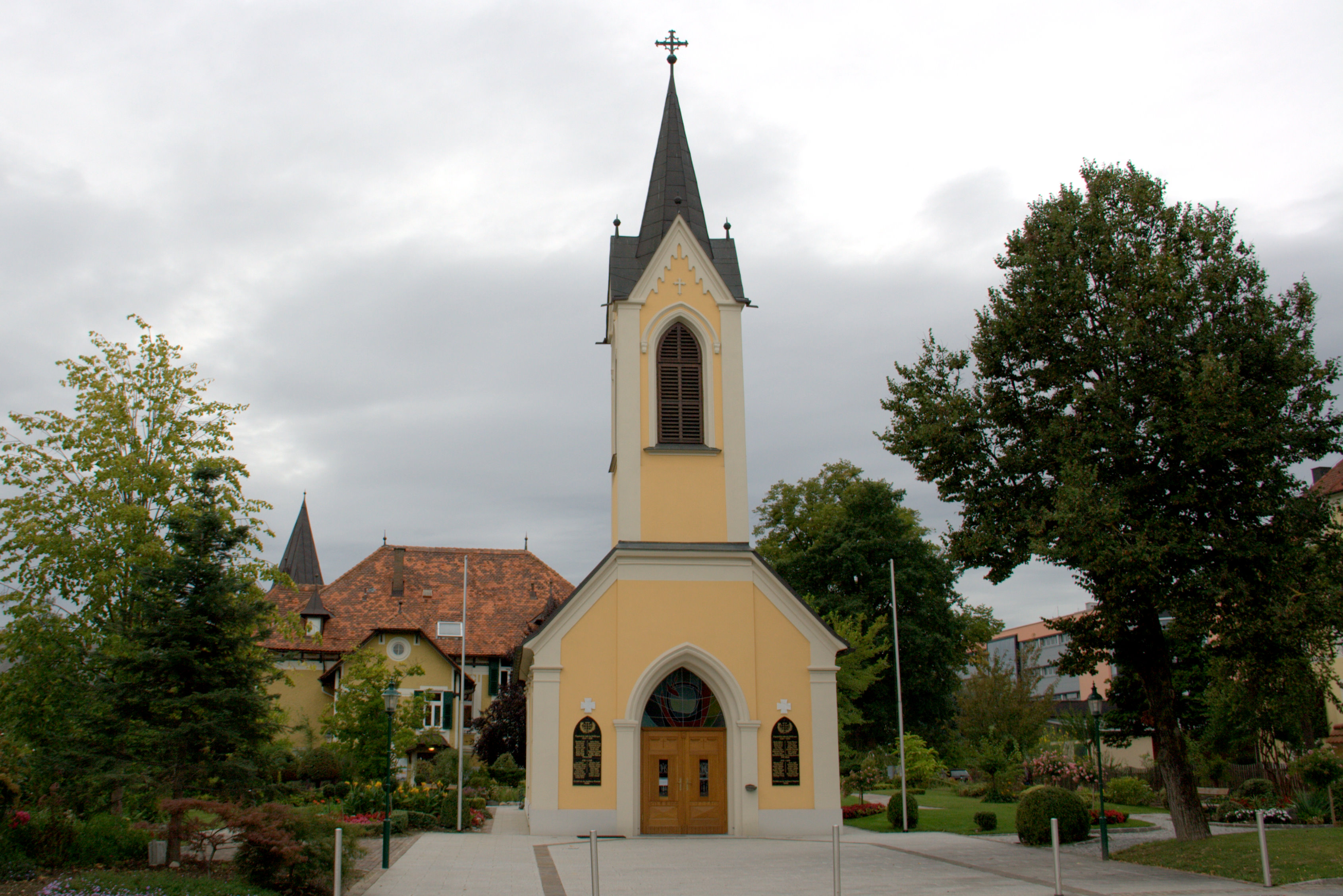
Chapel Zum gegeißelten Heiland in Raaba
- Schloss Spielerhof in Grambach
- Böhmervilla in Raaba, was built in 1870 in Jugendstil as Gut Neuhof and rebuilt in 1910.
- Chapel St Mary in Raaba
- Chapel in Grambach
- Chapel Zum gegeißelten Heiland in Raaba

=== Parks ===
The Lebenspark 2000 in Raaba was created by the merger of the Bohemian parks with the garden of the Fleckgründe and has an area of about 11,000 square metres (120,000 sq ft).

== Sources ==
- Mag. Ingo Mirsch, Dr. Carol Veenstra: Die Geschichte einer Gemeinde (Geschichte von Raaba). Erhältlich im Gemeindeamt.
- Mag. Ingo Mirsch: Raaba 1849 - 2000. Herausgegeben anlässlich der Markterhebung. Erhältlich im Gemeindeamt.
