= Grambach =

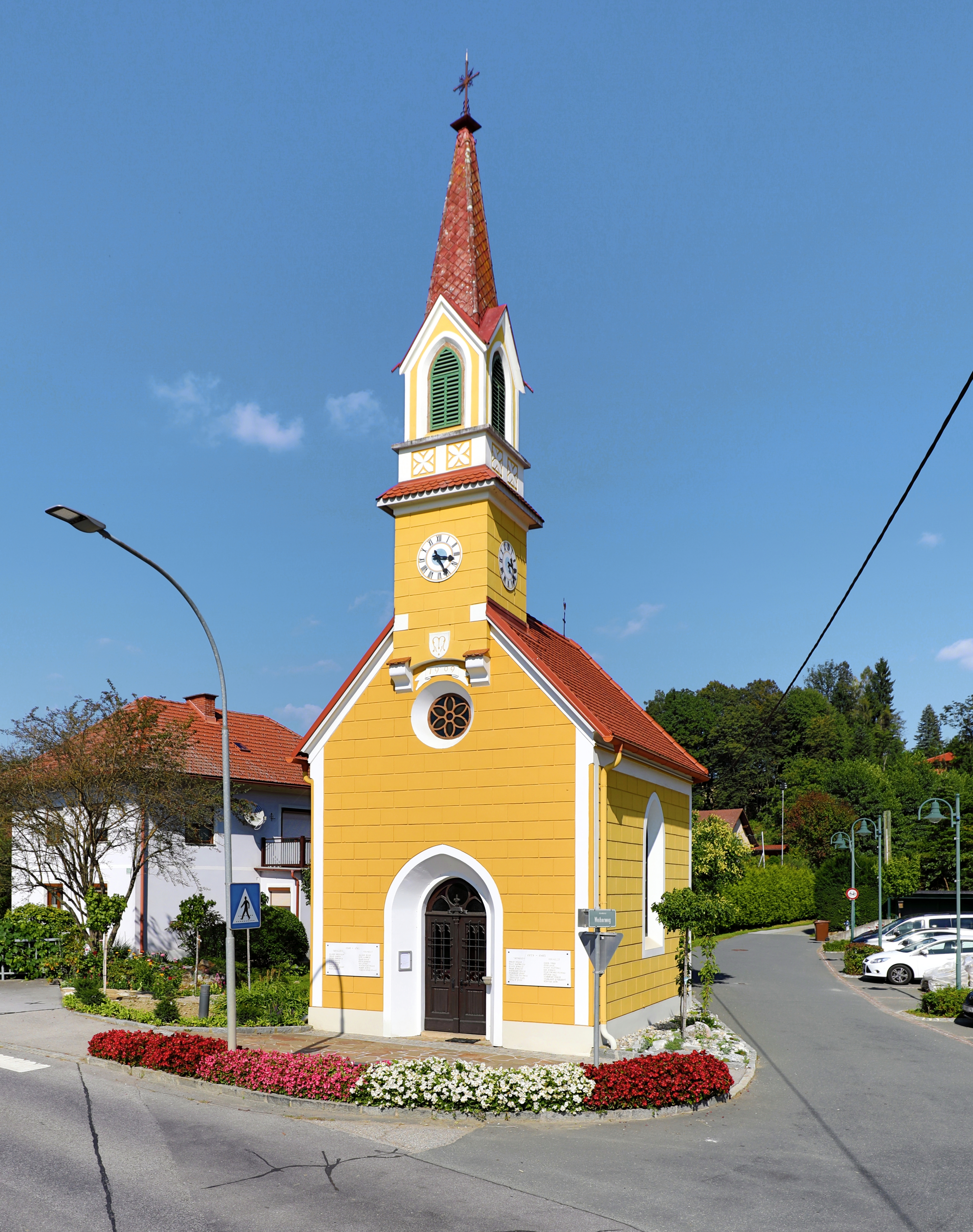
- Grambach chapel

- Coat of arms

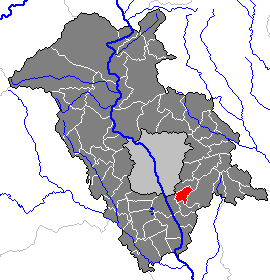
- Location within Graz-Umgebung district

- Location within Austria
- Coordinates: 47°00′50″N 15°30′10″E
- Country: Austria
- State: Styria
- District: Graz-Umgebung

Government
  - Mayor: Peter Gspaltl (SPÖ)

Area
  - Total: 6.94 km^{2} (2.68 sq mi)
- Elevation: 345 m (1,132 ft)

Population (2014-01-01)
  - Total: 1,758
  - Density: 253/km^{2} (656/sq mi)
- Time zone: UTC+1 (CET)
  - Summer (DST): UTC+2 (CEST)
- Postal code: 8071, 8074
- Area code: +43 316
- Vehicle registration: GU
- Website: www.grambach.at

Grambach was a municipality, now merged into Raaba-Grambach in 2015, in the district of Graz-Umgebung in the Austrian state of Styria. The other town, Raaba, was also dissolved into the merger.

== Population ==
Historical population
| Year | Pop. | ±% |
|---|---|---|
| 1869 | 983 | — |
| 1880 | 486 | −50.6% |
| 1890 | 497 | +2.3% |
| 1900 | 462 | −7.0% |
| 1910 | 441 | −4.5% |
| 1923 | 447 | +1.4% |
| 1934 | 483 | +8.1% |
| 1939 | 489 | +1.2% |
| 1951 | 511 | +4.5% |
| 1961 | 586 | +14.7% |
| 1971 | 1,021 | +74.2% |
| 1981 | 1,025 | +0.4% |
| 1991 | 1,150 | +12.2% |
| 2001 | 1,325 | +15.2% |
| 2005 | 1,512 | +14.1% |
| 2014 | 1,758 | +16.3% |
