= Tyrawa Wołoska =

Tyrawa Woloska
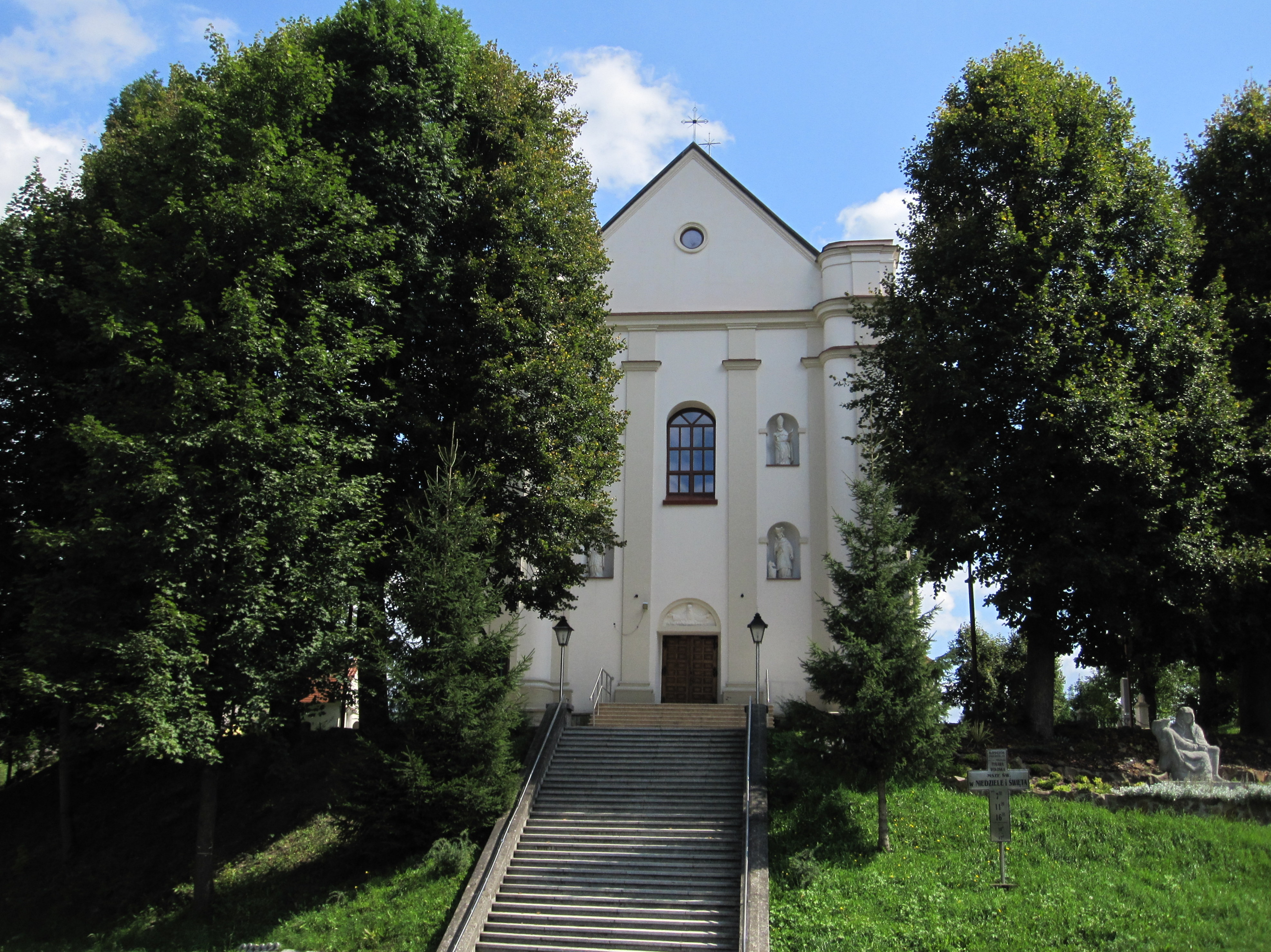
- Church of Saint Nicholas

- Coat of arms
- Interactive map of Tyrawa Woloska
- Location within Poland
- Coordinates: 49°35′N 22°22′E
- Country: Poland
- Region: Subcarpathian Voivodship
- Founded: 1402

Area
  - Total: 68.8 km^{2} (26.6 sq mi)
- Elevation: 340 m (1,120 ft)

Population
  - Total: 1,950

Tyrawa Wołoska [tɨˈrava vɔˈwɔska] is a village in East Małopolska in the Lesser Beskid mountains of Poland.

It is situated below the main watershed, at the foot of the Słonne Mountain, and has an elevation of 340 meters (1,120 ft). It belongs to the Subcarpathian Voivodship (since 1999), previously the Krosno Voivodship (1975-1998) and is part of the Sanok County; its parish: Tyrawa Woloska.

== Origins ==
Settled in prehistoric times, the south-eastern Poland region that is now Podkarpacie was overrun in pre-Roman times by various tribes, including the Celts, Goths and Vandals (the Przeworsk and Puchov cultures). After the fall of the Roman Empire, of which most of south-eastern Poland was part of (all territories below the San), the area was invaded by Hungarians and Slavs.

The region subsequently became part of the Great Moravian state. Upon the invasion of the Hungarian tribes into the heart of the Great Moravia around 899, the Lendians of the area declared their allegiance to Hungary. The region then became a site of contention between Poland, Rus and Hungary.

This area was mentioned for the first time in 981, when Volodymyr the Great of Kievan Rus took it over on his way into Poland. In 1018 it returned to Poland, in 1031 back to Rus, and in 1340 Casimir III of Poland recovered it.

The village "Tyravia" was first mentioned in 1402. The etymology is doubtful. It was founded on the principles of the "Wallachian Rights" whereas its ownership was passed over to the knights and family of Vogt Peter (Petrus) the Czech.

== Varied rulers ==
From 1340 to 1772 Tyrawa was part of Poland (Ruthenian Voivodship), while during 1772-1867 it belonged to the Austrian empire, and from 1867–1918 to Austria-Hungary. During the 120 years that this part of Poland was controlled by Austria, the area (including west and east of Subcarpathian Voivodship) was known as Galicia. In 1918 it returned to Poland.

The region was under the Magdeburg rights since 1707. The town was situated beside an often attended trade route to Hungary which guaranteed good opportunities for development, but as time passed the town started to decline, and by 1876 it had lost municipal rights.

== After World War II ==
In the immediate years after World War II (1945, 1946) some inhabitants left for Ukraine. On 29 April 1946 the village was attacked by a unit of the Ukrainian Insurgent Army (UPA) and some buildings were burnt. As a result, some people left Tyrawa (under the "Operation Vistula") and moved to the Pomerania area of Poland. Only over a dozen years after the war the village started to rebuild.

The rural families in this community are poor, as agriculture is rarely profitable and low income makes it difficult to reinvest and make improvements.

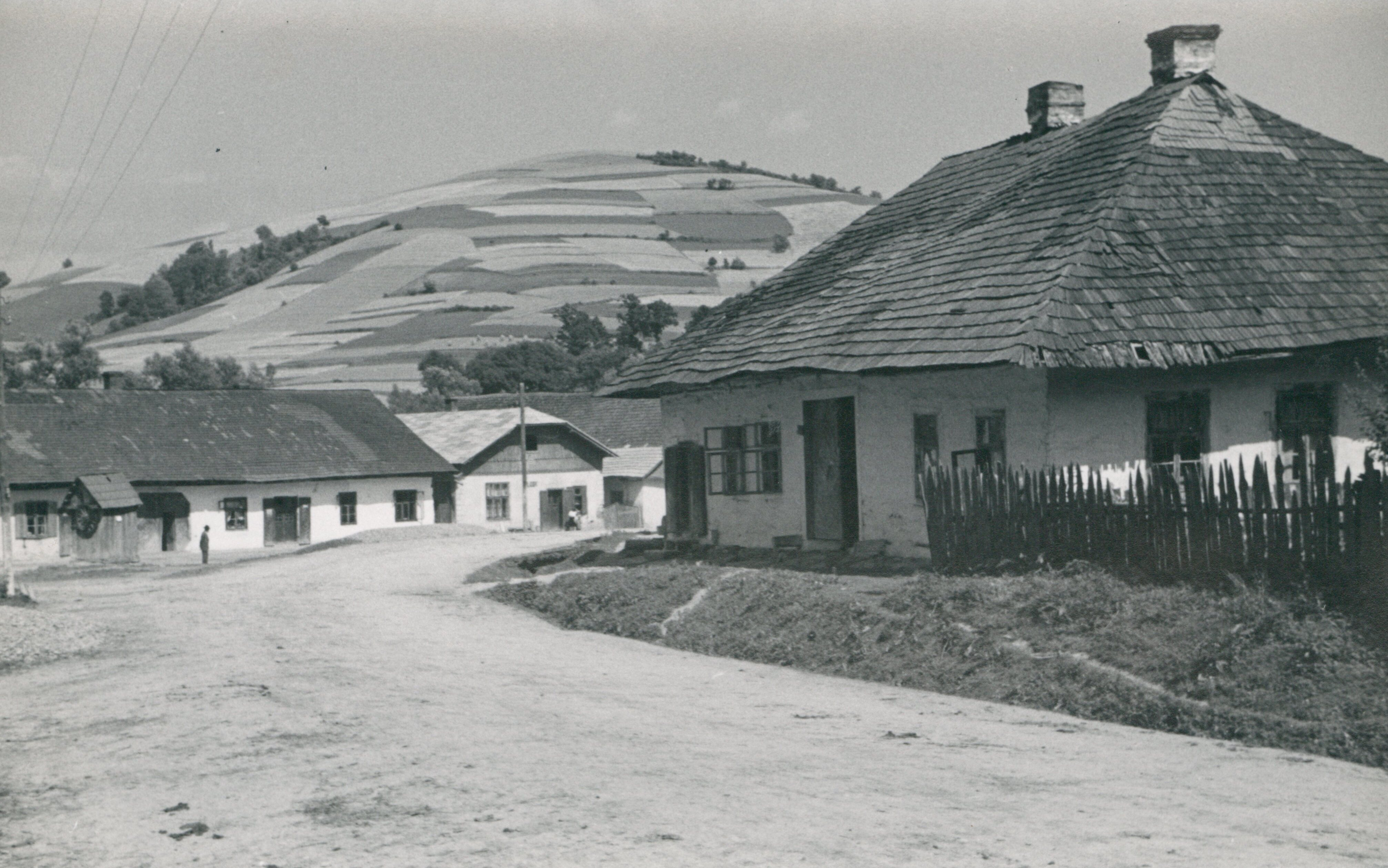
The Market Square in the 1930s

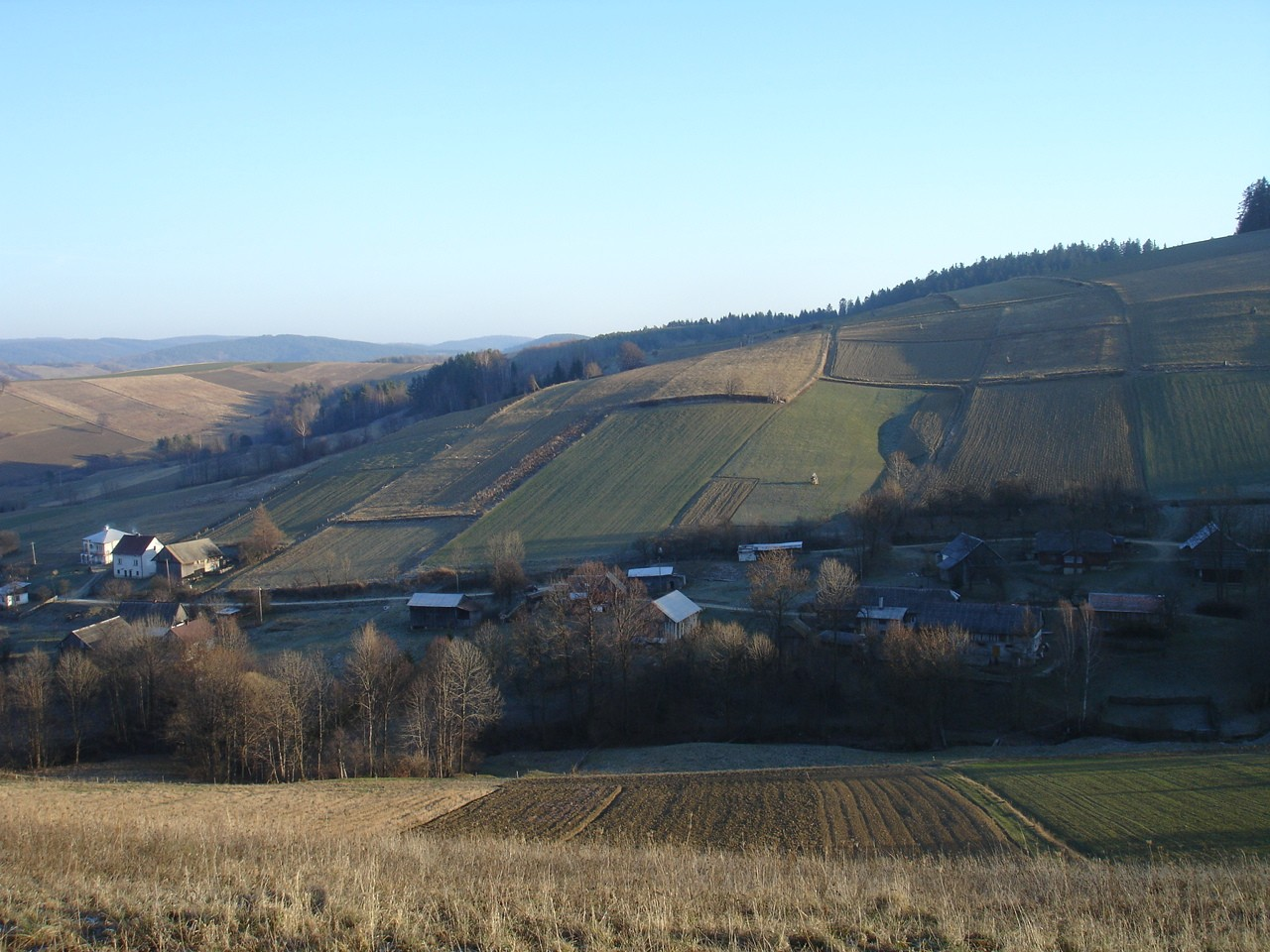
Tyrawa Wołoska in 2007

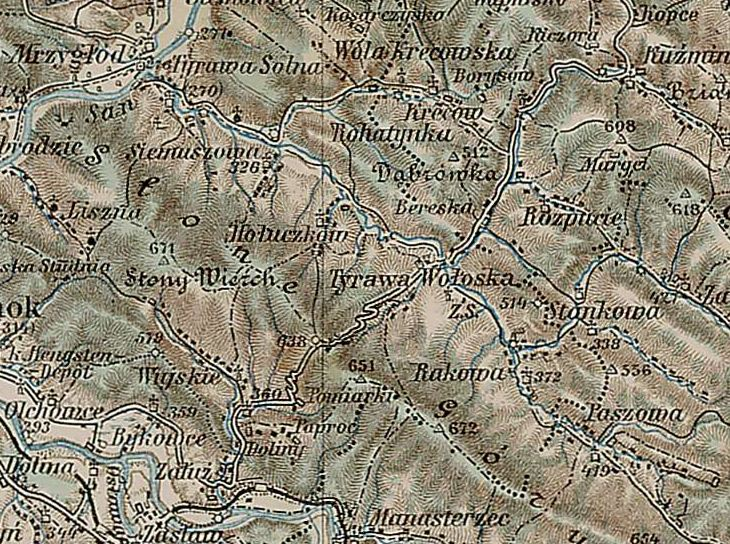
An 1898 map shows the location of Tyrawa Wołoska

== People ==
- Jacob Avigdor
