= Jacob Avigdor =

Rabbi Dr. Yaakov (also Jacob) Avigdor (March 20, 1896–March 30, 1967) was a Polish-Mexican rabbi, author and Holocaust survivor. Prior to the Holocaust he served as Chief Rabbi of Drohobych - Boryslav in Poland, and after the war, as rabbi of the Ashkenazi community in Mexico.

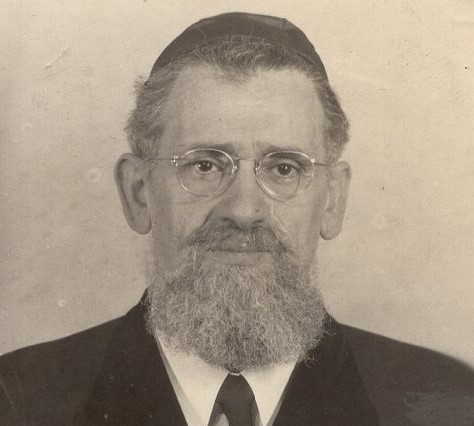
Rabbi Jacob Avigdor

== Life ==
Jacob Avigdor was born into a rabbinic family in Tyrawa Wołoska, a shtetl in the Austrian province of Galicia between the cities of Sanok and Przemyśl (now southeast Poland) in 1896. He excelled in religious studies, and being considered a prodigy, was ordained at the young age of 16 years. Later he studied at the universities in Kraków and Lviv, obtaining a PhD in Philosophy. Acquiring a high reputation as an orator and Talmudist, he was named Chief Rabbi of Drohobych and Boryslav, then in southeast Poland (now western Ukraine) in 1920 (age 24), where he officiated until the Nazi occupation. Being District Rabbi of about 80 surrounding villages, he also served as head ("Av") of the Beth din.

He officiated at the wedding of future Prime Minister of Israel Menachem Begin and Aliza Arnold in May of 1939 which took place at the Eden Hotel in Truskavets, Poland, which was a summer resort near Drohobych.

During the Holocaust, he lost his wife, his two daughters and his brother David the Rabbi of Andrychów, among many family members. After his liberation from the Buchenwald concentration camp, Avigdor became extremely active in the efforts of rescue and rehabilitation of Jewish refugees in postwar Europe. After immigrating to the U.S. in 1946, he accepted a pulpit in Brooklyn, New York, and six years later he was offered the rabbinate of Mexico, holding that position until his death in Mexico City in 1967.

Rabbi Dr. Avigdor was much consulted on religious and ethical questions by worldwide peers. A prolific writer, his topics included religious philosophy, Jewish history and traditions, and commentary on Biblical text. Most of his prewar works were lost. In Mexico, he became a regular contributor to Yiddish periodicals, and published books in that language, Hebrew and Spanish. The Holocaust Museum at Yad Vashem holds a Hebrew calendar written by him from memory during his stay at Buchenwald (to view it, see below External Links).

=== Reuniting with son Isaac ===
Rabbi Avigdor's son, Rabbi Isaac C. Avigdor, also survived the war (at Mauthausen concentration camp). He had seen the death of a man, and not long after the war, at a DP camp in Italy, he wrote a document for his widow as witness. As she relocated to Germany and wanted to remarry, the senior Rabbi Jacob Avigdor, at the time head of the Jewish court in postwar Bergen-Belsen, needed proof that the woman's husband had died. She gave Rabbi Jacob the formal document written by Rabbi Isaac. This is how the father found out the son was still alive, allowing them to reunite, many months after the war.

Rabbi Isaac included this story in a book about his father's life, Faith After the Flames: The Life of Rabbi Dr. Yaakov Avigdor and details are included in a published book review. The story of the father, the son, and the widow is also told by Holocaust writer Esther Farbstein in her Hidden in Thunder: Perspective on Faith, Halachah and Leadership, volume 1

Rabbi Isaac C. Avigdor (1920-2010), son of Rabbi Jacob Avigdor, became a community rabbi in Connecticut "for a half century", and for decades a columnist in The Jewish Press.

== Works ==
- Nauka Talmudu -1928 (Polish, with subsequent Hebrew and German editions, three volumes)
- Chelek Yacov - 1929 (Hebrew)
- Metafizyka Judaismu -1931 (Polish, Doctorate Thesis, Lviv University)
- Haemunah V'haphilosophia‡ -1933 (Polish)
- Sheelot Utshuvot Abir Yacov -1934 (Hebrew, two volumes)
- Harambam V'shitato B'philosophia‡ -1935 (Polish)
- Ayeh Sofer -1937 (Hebrew)
- Torat Halashon -1938 (Hebrew)
- Sheelot Utshuvot Heshiv Yacov -1939 (Hebrew)
- Al Hashchitah‡ - 1939 (Polish)
- Techiyat Yacov -1950 (Hebrew)
- La Cronología Judaica -1954 (Spanish)
- Maimónides, su Vida y Obra -1955 (Spanish)
- Kuntres Kol Yacov -1956 (Hebrew)
- Shevichtav V'sheval Peh (In Shrift Un Vort) - 1957 (Yiddish, volumes I and II) and 1958 (Yiddish, volume III)
- La Vision del Judaismo -1959 (Spanish, two volumes)
- Machshoveh V'loshn (Gedank Un Shprach) -1959 (Yiddish)
- Reflexiones Sobre la Torá -1960 (Spanish)
- Dee Yiddishe Froy/La Mujer Judía - 1960 (Yiddish and Spanish)
- [Chelek Yacov Aleph - 1961 reprint of Chelek Yacov]
- [Chelek Yacov Bet - 1961 reprint of Ayeh Sofer and Techiyat Yacov].
- Hegyon Yacov -1962 (Yiddish, two volumes)
- Torah Sh’veal Peh -1962 (Yiddish, volume I) and 1963 (Yiddish, volume II)
- Haskel V'yadoa -1962 (Hebrew, volumes I and II) and 1963 (Hebrew, volume III)
- Der Yiddisher Shabos/El Sabado Judío -1963 (Yiddish and Spanish)
- Haemuna Hanotzrit L'or Hahalacha Hayehudit -1964 (Hebrew)
- Oifzatzn Un Esayen -1965 (Yiddish)
- Mikdash Me'at -1965 (Hebrew)
- Mul Baayot Hador -1965 (Hebrew, volume I) and 1966 (Hebrew, volume II)
- Síntesis del Talmud: Exposición de su Desarrollo Histórico -1966 (Spanish, two volumes)

(‡ Hebrew translation of the Polish title per biographical sources in the Hebrew language; original Polish title unknown)
