= Metodyj Trochanovskij =

Lemko activist and grammarian

Metodyj Trochanovskij Методий Трохановский
- Born: May 5, 1885; Binczarowa, Kingdom of Galicia and Lodomeria, Austria-Hungary
- Died: February 15, 1948 (aged 62); Wrocław, Poland
- Other names: Methodius Trochanowski, Metody Trochanowski
- Education: Teacher's Seminary, Krosno
- Occupations: Schoolteacher, editor
- Criminal charge: Treason
- Criminal penalty: Death
- Criminal status: Execution stayed
- Spouse: Konstancija Durkot

Metodyj Trochanovskij (Методий Трохановский; May 5, 1885 – February 15, 1948) was a Lemko activist and teacher.

== Biography ==
Metodyj Trochanovskij was born in Binczarowa, Poland, when it was part of the Kingdom of Galicia and Lodomeria of Austria-Hungary, on May 5, 1885.

After receiving his pedagogical education at the Teacher's Seminary in Krosno, he taught at the elementary school in the Lemko village of Uhryn. In 1913, he married Konstancija Durkot, daughter of a prominent Lemko priest and civil activist, Father Ioann Chrysostom Durkot, and became involved in Lemko-Rusyn educational and social concerns.

At the onset of World War I, he was accused of treason against Austria-Hungary, arrested, prosecuted, and sentenced to death in 1916 during the Second Vienna Trial. The execution was stayed, and he was released from Talerhof in 1917, when it was closed.

He was noted for urging his fellow Lemkos to form cooperatives and credit unions, and warned of the dangers of the Ukrainization of the Lemko Region. He authored an early primer and grammar of the Lemko form of the Rusyn language.

He was one of the organizers of the event that led to the construction of the Talerhof Cross. He was jailed for his intellectual and political activities by the Nazi invaders in 1941, and in turn by the invading Soviets and the NKVD in 1944. He was freed from prison, but moved with his family to Wrocław in 1947. He died there soon afterwards, on February 15, 1948.

== Publications ==
- Trochanovskij, Metodyj (1935). Буквар. Перша книжечка для народных школ. [Bukvar. Perša knyžečka dlja narodnŷch škol.] (in Rusyn). Lviv.
- Trochanovskij, Metodyj (1936). Друга книжечка для народных школ. [Druha knyžečka dlja narodnŷch škol.] (in Rusyn).
