= Lemko Republic =

1918–1920 Rusyn state in Europe

Coordinates: 49°34′00″N 20°59′00″E

Lemko-Rusyn People's Republic Руска Народна Република Лемків (Rusyn)
- 1918–1920
- Flag

- The approximate extent of the territory whose southern parts were claimed by the Lemko Republic (yellow)
- Capital: Florynka
- Common languages: Rusyn
- Government: Republic
- President
  - 1918–1920: Jaroslav Kacmarcyk
- Historical era: Interwar period
  - Established: 5 December 1918
  - Disestablished: March 1920
Preceded by	Succeeded by
Austria-Hungary; Kingdom of Galicia and Lodomeria	Second Polish Republic
- Today part of: Poland

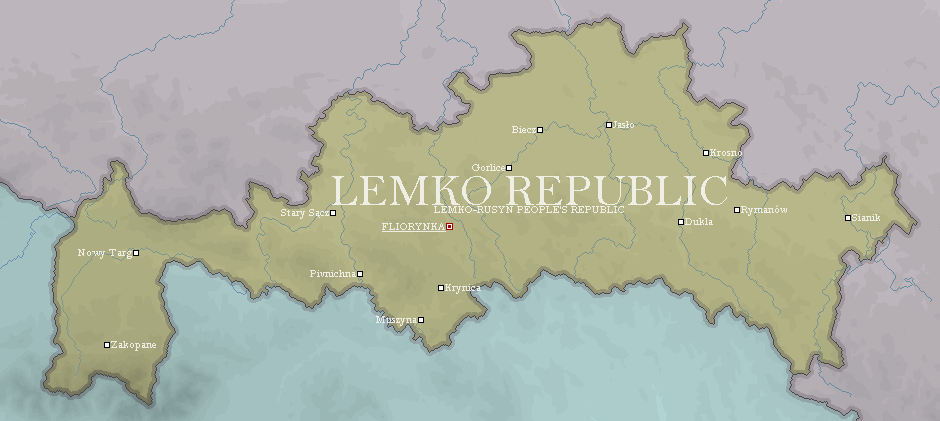
Map detailing the Galician administrative units whose southern parts were claimed by the Lemko Republic

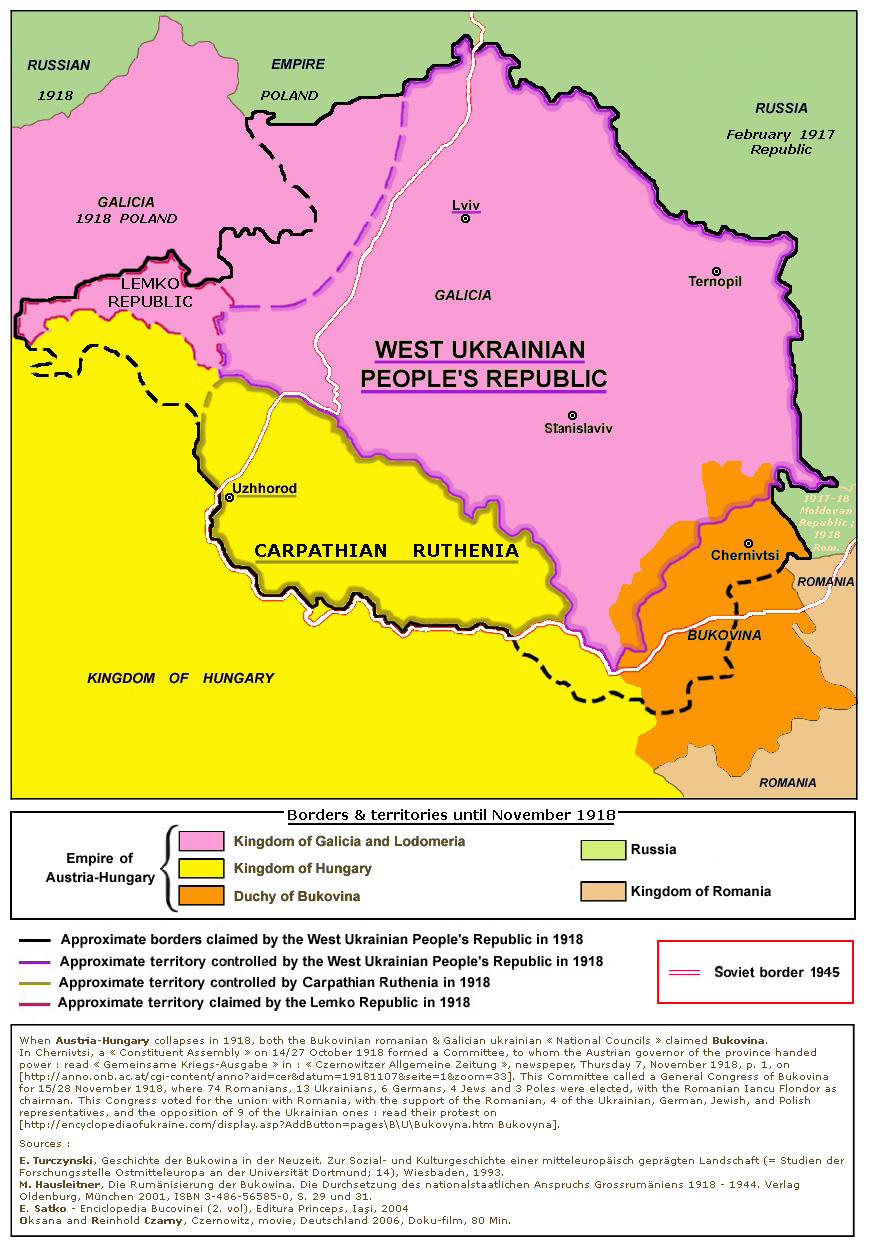
Map of the areas claimed and controlled by the Carpathian Ruthenia, the Lemko Republic and the West Ukrainian People's Republic in 1918

Lemko-Rusyn People's Republic (Rusyn: Руска Народна Република Лемків, romanized: Ruska Narodna Respublika Lemkiv, lit. 'Rusyn National Republic of Lemkos'), often known also as the Lemko-Rusyn Republic, just the Lemko Republic, or the Florynka Republic, was a short-lived state founded on 5 December 1918 in the aftermath of World War I and the dissolution of the Austro-Hungarian Empire. It was centered on Florynka, a village in the south-east of present-day Poland. Being Russophile, its intent was unification with a democratic Russia and was opposed to a union with the West Ukrainian People's Republic. A union with Russia proved impossible, so the Republic then attempted to join Subcarpathian Rus' as an autonomous province of Czechoslovakia. This, however, was opposed by the then governor of Subcarpathian Rus', Gregory Žatkovič.

The Republic was headed by Jaroslav Kacmarcyk as President of the Central National Council. It was ended in March 1920 when the Polish government arrested Kacmarcyk and other members of the Lemko government. Its fate was sealed by the September 1919 Treaty of Saint-Germain, which gave Galicia west of the San to Poland and by the Peace of Riga in March 1921 whereby the fait accompli was recognized by Moscow.

This state should not be confused with the Komancza Republic of eastern Lemko Region, another short-lived republic. This was a smaller pro-Ukrainian state that existed between November 1918 and 23 January 1919.

== Background ==
In the middle of the 19th century, the question of Rusyn population in Galicia turned into a power struggle between Austria, Russia and Poland. A circle of Russophile pan-Slavists formed around Mikhail Pogodin who visited Galicia regularly, and conducted talks with anti-Polish clergy of Eastern Catholic and Eastern Orthodox denominations. The spread of pro-Russian sympathies proved successful as there already were cultural and social conflicts between the Poles and Rusyn peasants, resulting in an anti-Polish attitude. Antipathy towards Poland was also caused by the attitude of Polish nationalist groups, which spread the belief that Rusyns were a Polish tribe and that Rusyn culture was just a regional variation of the Polish one. Rusyns demanded that Eastern Catholic customs be freely respected in Galicia, and for the Rusyn language to be represented in administration and schools. Fears of Polonization and ignorance concerning the treatments of Rusyns and Ukrainians within the borders of the Russian Empire made the Russian campaign particularly successful, and already in 1849 the Lemkos sent a delegation to Tsar Nicholas I led by Mykhailo Hrynda of Szlachtowa, which asked the Tsar for his "protection".

Mykhailo Hrushevsky stresses that there was no nationalism nor a strong identity present in the Rusyn circles, the cultural and religious differences made it impossible to identify with both the Polish and Ukrainian population, and yet despite a common desire for independence or autonomy, there were not any strong foundations for a Lemko nation. In other words, Lemkos were certain that they were not Poles nor Ukrainians and sought sovereignty from them, and yet many did not feel like they formed a nation on their own either. Russian agitation solved this problem, and many Rusyns proceeded to identify with the Russian nation and culture.

The Russophilia of Rusyn circles came to be combated by the Ukrainian nationalist movements, most importantly the Prosvita society, and by the dominant Polish element as well. This temporarily weakened the pro-Russian ambitions of the Rusyns, but it returned as a consequence of Russian defeat in the Russo-Japanese War. In 1907, the National Democrats came to represent Galicia in the Viennese parliament. National Democrats represented a Russophile current, believing that rebuilding the Polish state lied in collaboration with Russia in exchange for extensive autonomy and combating Ukrainian nationalism. This pro-Russian attitude of the National Democrats greatly empowered the Russophile Rusyns and weakened the Ukrainian movement in the Lemko region.

The First World War resulted in the Russian occupation of Galicia, which Russian officials declared to be "eternally Russian lands". Russia made vigorous efforts to integrate Galicia into Russia, and conducted mass conversions from Greek Catholicism to Eastern Orthodoxy. The Ukrainian national movement was repressed, with most Ukrainian politicians fleeing to Vienna. Andrey Sheptytsky, the Greek Catholic metropolitan, was arrested. The situation was quickly reversed when the Russian army was pushed back, with mass arrests and reprisals against pro-Russian circles by the Austrian army, including against the Rusyn movement. The war greatly polarised the Ukrainian and Russophile factions amongst Lemko activists, with the East being swayed towards supporting the Ukrainians and proclaiming a pro-Ukrainian Komancza Republic, while western Lemkos remained hostile to Ukrainian nationalism.

== Proclamation ==
The western Lemkos were concerned that they would be incorporated into the Western Ukrainian People's Republic against their will. In November 1918, an anti-Ukrainian rally was held in Świątkowa Wielka, where Rusyn activists spoke against joining the Ukrainian state. A political conference of Lemko activists in Gładyszów proclaimed that the Lemko region could only belong to a Rusyn state. Jarosław Moklak notes that the resolutions of Gładyszów received support from local Lemkos, as they considered the Ukrainian nation foreign to them and feared being dismissed as a mere regional variant of the Ukrainian culture. Further rallies took place in Grybów and Nowy Sącz.

On 5 December 1918, over 500 Rusyn representatives of 130 villages and towns in the western Lemko Region held a national congress in Florynka, with the Slovak representatives from the Prešov Region also present as well. Additionally, a representative of the Polish government, Kazimierz Romult, was present as well. The congress proclaimed the creation of 'Nachalnyi Sovit', the executive council, and 'Russka Rada', the national council. Mykhal Iurchakevych led the former, while Jaroslav Kacmarcyk of Muszyna was elected as the head of the latter. The newly proclaimed government proceeded to establish its control over the region, forming a national guard and workers' cooperatives. Given that the Lemko Republic was opposed to the West Ukrainian People's Republic, the Polish government expected the Lemko state to support them and offered them the former town hall of Grybów for its government headquarters. However, the Lemkos were not interested in joining the Polish state and desired to join Russia instead. At the end of 1918, the council announced the incorporation of the Lemko region into Russia, although it was not specified whether the council meant Soviet Russia or White Russia. The Rusyn Council established its control on the region, prohibiting teachers and officials from submitting "pledges of loyalty" to the Polish government, and public documents referred to the Republic as the "Russian National Republic".

The collapse of Russia put the pro-Russian republic in a difficult situation, and the republic started seeking alternatives. This made the Lemkos develop a pro-Czechoslovak policy as to avoid integration into Poland, and the pro-Czech attitude was already widespread amongst the Rusyns of Slovakia and Carpathian Ruthenia. In January 1919, Lemko council members met with Rusyns of Carpathia and under the leadership of Antonii Beskyd formed a united Carpatho-Rusyn National Council, announcing that the Lemkos of Galicia and Rusyns of Carpathia formed a single nation that would join Czechoslovakia. A delegation was sent to the Paris Peace Conference, which issued a formal memorandum in April 1919 of a united Rusyn state which would encompass the Lemko region in Galicia, the Prešov Region and Carpathian Ruthenia. Gregory Žatkovich, the first governor of Czechoslovak Carpathian Ruthenia, vehemently opposed the annexation of Lemko Region into Czechoslovakia, given that it would provoke a war in Poland and that the Entente powers had already allowed Poland to occupy all of Galicia until the resolution of the Russian Civil War. While the Polish government was passive towards the Lemko state and saw no need to suppress it thanks to its anti-Ukrainian attitude, the pro-Czech attitude concerned the Polish authorities, and unlike Russophilia, was seen as a threat to the Polish nation state. Following the proclamation by the Lemko Council the Republic would join Czechoslovakia as part of Carpathian Ukraine, the Polish army quickly occupied the region in March 1920, effectively dissolving the Lemko Republic. A trial of the council members took place on 10 June 1921 in Nowy Sącz, but the Polish court was lenient towards the Lemko activists and acquitted every defendant.

Following the annexation of the Lemko-Rusyn Republic and the lenient trial, the newly established Polish state ignored Lemkos and did not interfere in the local political affairs. The success of the Polish state and the downfall of the Ukrainian one re-evaluated Rusyn politics, with the Russophile Lemkos becoming split between left-wing pro-Soviet and anti-Bolshevik right wing activists, known as the Old Rusyns. Old Rusyns remained loyal to the Russophile cause, but also declared loyalty towards the Polish state and started advocating for autonomy within Poland, without abandoning their Rusyn national consciousness. Given the partition of Ukrainian lands between Poland and the Soviet Union, the pro-Ukrainian Lemkos merged with the pro-Russian groups, seeing either the Soviets or the Polish state as preferable. Jaroslav Kacmarcyk never gave up on his ambition to join Russia, and continued to support a union with Russia, even if under Bolshevik governance.

== Territory ==
Map comparing the maximum claims of the Lemko Republic with the Polish and Czechoslovak borders of the 1920s.

On 5 December 1918, the Republic's delegates issued the statement: "We, the Rusyn nation, living in a compact settlement in the southern parts of the Galician administrative units of Nowy Targ, Nowy Sącz, Grybów, Gorlice, Jasło, Krosno, and Sanok do not wish to be incorporated into the Polish state, and wish to share the fate of our Rusyn brothers [living] in Spiš, Šariš, and Zemplín counties as one indivisible geographic and ethnographic unit."

== See also ==
- First Republic of Pińczów
- Hutsul Republic
- Komańcza Republic
- Lemkos
- Republic of Gniew
- Republic of Ostrów
- Republic of Tarnobrzeg
- Republic of Zakopane
