= Graz Airport =

International airport in Styria, Austria

Graz Airport Flughafen Graz

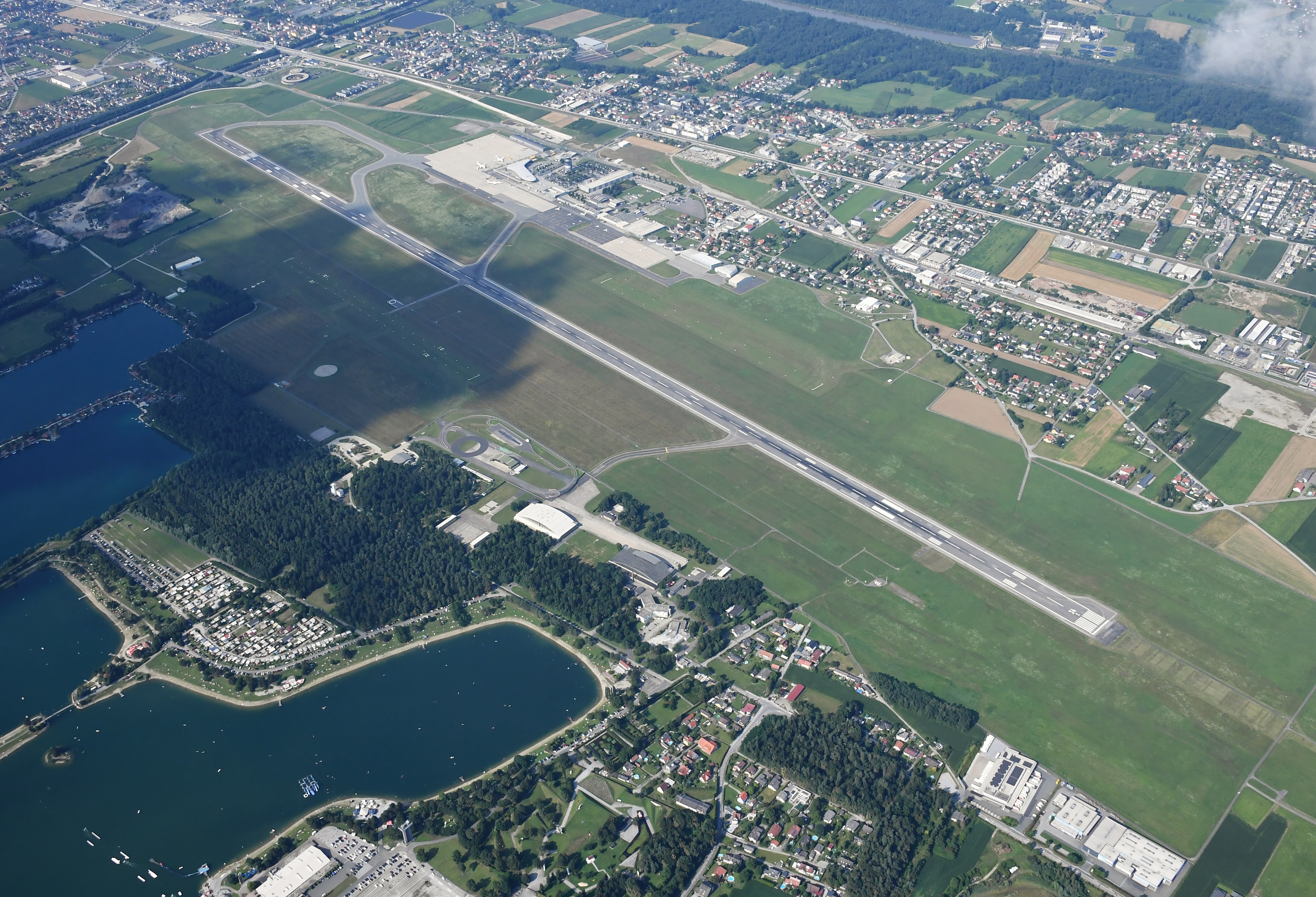
- IATA: GRZ; ICAO: LOWG

Summary
- Airport type: Public
- Owner: Holding Graz - Kommunale Dienstleistungen GmbH (93.9%)
- Operator: Flughafen Graz Betriebs GmbH
- Serves: Graz
- Location: Abtissendorf, Feldkirchen and Thalerhof, Kalsdorf, Styria, Austria
- Elevation AMSL: 340 m (1,120 ft)
- Coordinates: 46°59′35″N 015°26′21″E
- Website: graz-airport.at/en/

Map
- Location of airport in Austria

Runways
Direction	Length		Surface
Direction	m	ft	Surface
16L/34R	640	2,100	Grass
16C	2,740	8,989	Asphalt
34C	3,000	9,842	Asphalt
16R/34L	760	2,493	Grass

Statistics (2025)
- Passengers: 831,095 ▲+1.4%
- Aircraft movements: 10,427 ▲+1.7%
- Cargo (metric tons): 5 ▼-72.6%
- Sources: Austrian AIP at EUROCONTROL, Statistics Austria

Graz Airport (IATA: GRZ, ICAO: LOWG), known as Flughafen Graz in German, is a primary international airport serving southern Austria. It is located near Graz, the second-largest city in Austria, in the municipalities of Feldkirchen and Kalsdorf, 5 NM (9.3 km; 5.8 mi) south of Graz city centre.

== Location ==
Graz Airport spans the village of Abtissendorf in Feldkirchen municipality and the cadastral community of Thalerhof in Kalsdorf municipality. The airport terminal is located in Abtissendorf.

== History ==
=== Early years ===
Construction of the airport began in 1913 with the construction of a grass runway and the first hangars; the airport saw its first flight in 1914. It was the site of Thalerhof internment camp, run by the governments of Franz Joseph I of Austria and Charles I of Austria. The first domestic passenger flight in Austria in 1925 serviced the route Vienna–Graz–Klagenfurt. In 1930 Yugoslav flag carrier Aeroput started regular flights linking Yugoslav capital Belgrade with Vienna with stops in Zagreb and Graz.

In 1937, construction of a terminal building began due to increase in the number of passengers.

After the end of the Second World War, Austria was forbidden to possess either a military or civilian aviation fleet. After the reopening of Austrian airspace in 1951, a new concrete runway of 1,500 metres (4,921 ft) was built in Graz. The runway was extended to 2,000 metres (6,562 ft) in 1962. The route network grew quickly and the first international scheduled flight started in 1966 with flights to Frankfurt.

In 1969, the runway was extended again, this time to 2,500 metres (8,202 ft), and construction of a new terminal building became necessary. Highlights were visits by Concorde in 1981 and by a Boeing 747 on the occasion of the airport's 70th anniversary in 1984. Ten years later, another new building was constructed with a maximum annual capacity of 750,000 passengers. The latest extension of the runway was to 3,000 metres (9,843 ft) in 1998.

=== Development in the 2000s ===
In early 21st century, the number of passengers exceeded the 750,000 mark and in 2004 was just below 900,000. This led to the final extension of the current terminal building in 2003 and the construction of a second terminal in 2005.

In summer 2015, the airport received two new routes to European hubs: Swiss International Air Lines to Zurich and Turkish Airlines to Istanbul Atatürk Airport. Though Turkish Airlines discontinued their services to Istanbul in the wake of the COVID-19 pandemic, Swiss International Air Lines announced it would increase the frequency of flights between Zürich and Graz in summer 2023.

In December 2022, Eurowings announced that it will establish an additional base at Graz Airport, starting in 2023. This major commitment to Graz features nine new routes, with two of them linking Graz to Berlin and Hamburg and the other ones being leisure routes. Furthermore, the overall frequencies of already existing services to Düsseldorf and Palma de Mallorca will be enhanced. Yet with all these new routes, the route from Graz to Stuttgart, which was established in 2021, was discontinued in April 2023.

In 2024, Graz had recovered approximately 79 percent of its passenger numbers compared to before the COVID-19 pandemic.

== Facilities ==
=== Terminal and apron ===
The passenger terminal building features shops, travel agencies, a restaurant and cafés, conference facilities, a bank, car rental and service counters. The apron provides stands for aircraft up to the size of a Boeing 747 or An-124. There are no jet bridges, mobile stairways are used for boarding. The airport has a VIP lounge for business class customers and customers with priority status.

=== Freight ===
The airport is equipped with cargo handling facilities including storage and customs. While there are no scheduled cargo flights to the airport, charter flights are regularly conducted, especially for time-critical cargo like automotive parts.

== Airlines and destinations ==
The following airlines offer regular scheduled, seasonal, and charter flights at Graz Airport:

Airlines	Destinations
Air Dolomiti	Munich
Avanti Air	Calvi, Friedrichshafen, Linz, Paros, Skiathos
British Airways	London–Gatwick
Corendon Airlines	Seasonal: Heraklion, Hurghada
Croatia Airlines	Brač
Eurowings	Berlin, Düsseldorf, Hamburg; Seasonal: Chania, Corfu, Gran Canaria, Heraklion, Hurghada, Karpathos, Kos, Larnaca, Olbia, Palma de Mallorca, Rhodes, Salzburg, Tenerife–South
Lufthansa	Frankfurt, Munich
Pegasus Airlines	Seasonal: Antalya
SunExpress	Antalya
Swiss International Air Lines	Zurich

== Incidents and accidents ==
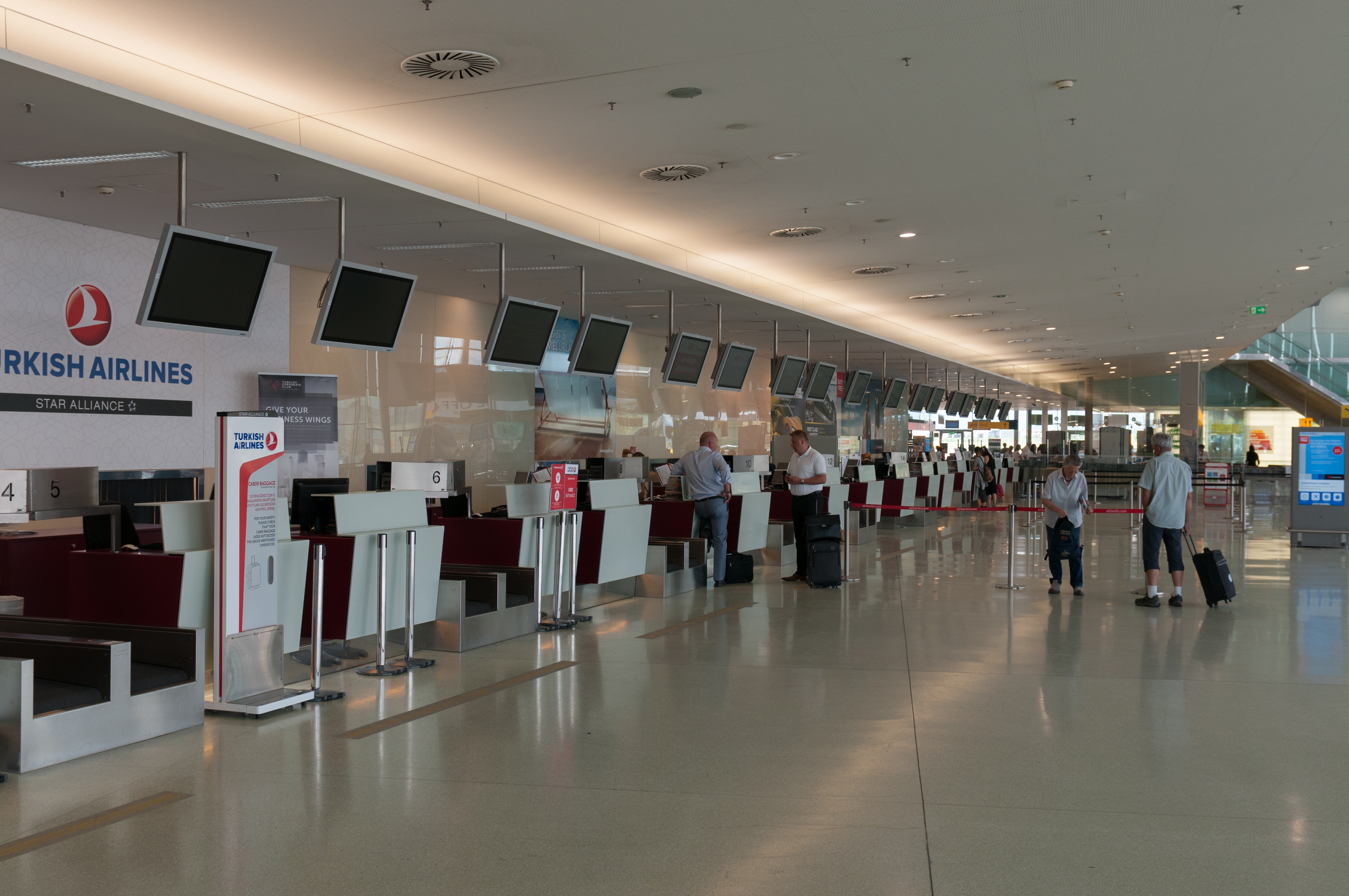
Check-in area

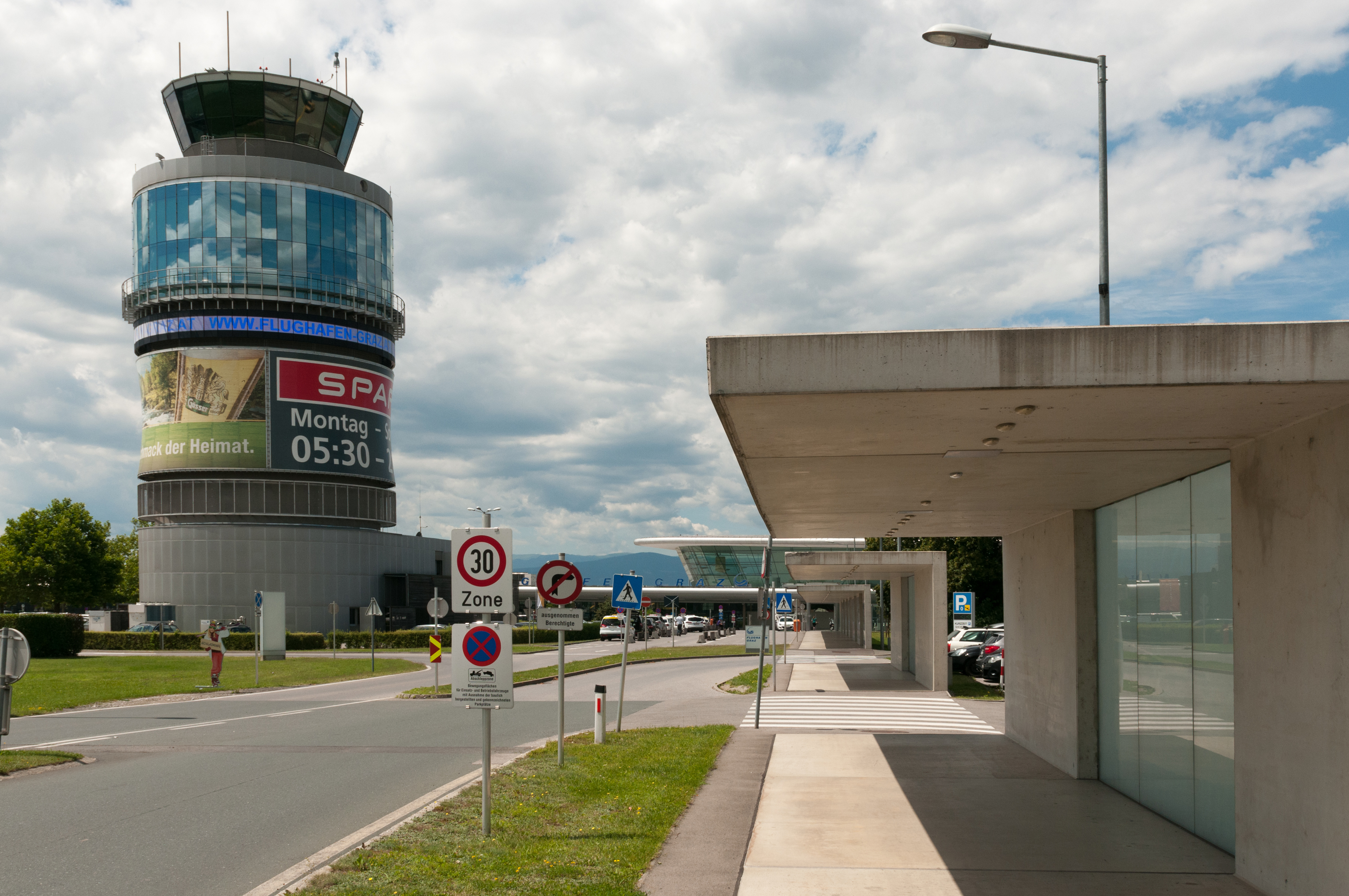
Control tower

- On 23 December 2024, Swiss International Air Lines Flight 1885, an Airbus A220-300 registered as HB-JCD, flying from Bucharest, Romania, to Zurich, Switzerland, diverted to Graz Airport due to smoke development in the cabin. The aircraft was evacuated using the emergency slides, and 17 passengers and 5 crew members were hospitalized. SWISS announced on 30 December 2024 that one of the flight attendants had died in the hospital.

== Ground transport ==
=== Road ===
Graz Airport is accessible via motorways A9 (exit Kalsdorf) and A2 (exit Flughafen Graz/Feldkirchen). A bus stop can be found next to the arrival area. Regional bus line 630 operates service to Graz, the transfer to central Graz takes approximately 35–50 minutes.

=== Rail ===
The airport is within walking distance (approximately 420 metres, seven minutes on foot) of the Graz-Feldkirchen Airport Railway Station (Flughafen Graz-Feldkirchen Bahnhof). Line S1 (Mürzzuschlag via Graz to Spielfeld-Straß) connects the airport to Graz. The journey from the Graz-Feldkirchen Airport Railway Station to the Graz Main Station takes 13 minutes.

== See also ==
- Transport in Austria
- List of airports in Austria
