= Kalsdorf bei Graz =

Municipality in Austria

- Municipality
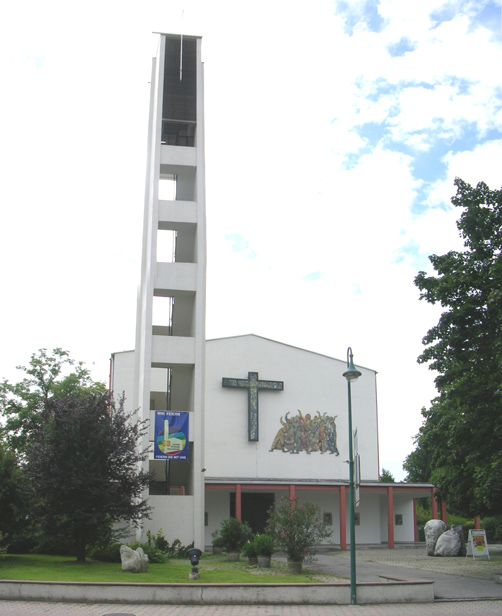
- Kalsdorf parish church

- Coat of arms

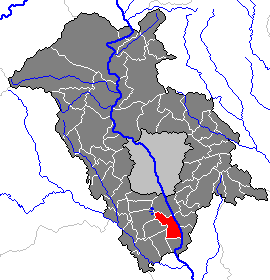
- Location within Graz-Umgebung district

- Location within Austria
- Coordinates: 46°57′58″N 15°28′54″E
- Country: Austria
- State: Styria
- District: Graz-Umgebung

Government
  - Mayor: Helmuth Adam (SPÖ)

Area
  - Total: 15.09 km^{2} (5.83 sq mi)
- Elevation: 324 m (1,063 ft)

Population (2018-01-01)
  - Total: 6,954
  - Density: 460.8/km^{2} (1,194/sq mi)
- Time zone: UTC+1 (CET)
  - Summer (DST): UTC+2 (CEST)
- Postal code: 8401
- Area code: 03135
- Vehicle registration: GU
- Website: www.kalsdorf-graz.at

Kalsdorf bei Graz (German: [ˈkaːlsˌdoʁf baɪ̯ gʁat͡s]) is a municipality in the district Graz-Umgebung in Styria, Austria.

== Geography ==
Kalsdorf lies about 13 km south of Graz next to the river Mur.

=== Subdivisions ===
Cadastral communities: Forst, Thalerhof, Großsulz, and Kleinsulz
