= Jaroslav Kacmarcyk =

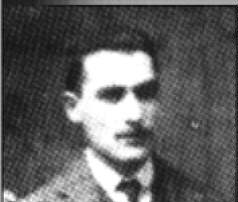
- Kacmarcyk, circa 1919
- Born: 1885; Binczarowa, Kingdom of Galicia and Lodomeria, Austria-Hungary
- Died: 1944
- Other names: Iaroslav Karchmarchyk, Jarosław Kaczmarczyk
- Known for: President of the Lemko-Rusyn Republic
- Title: President of the Lemko-Rusyn Republic
- Parent: Teofil Kacmarcyk

Doctor Jaroslav Kacmarcyk or Jarosław Kaczmarczyk, also spelled Iaroslav Karchmarchyk (1885–1944) was the head of the Lemko-Rusyn Republic from 1918 to 1920. He was tried by the Polish government for anti-Polish agitation on June 6, 1921, and was acquitted.

He was born in Binczarowa, in the Kingdom of Galicia and Lodomeria (present-day Poland).
