= Raaba =

- Former municipality
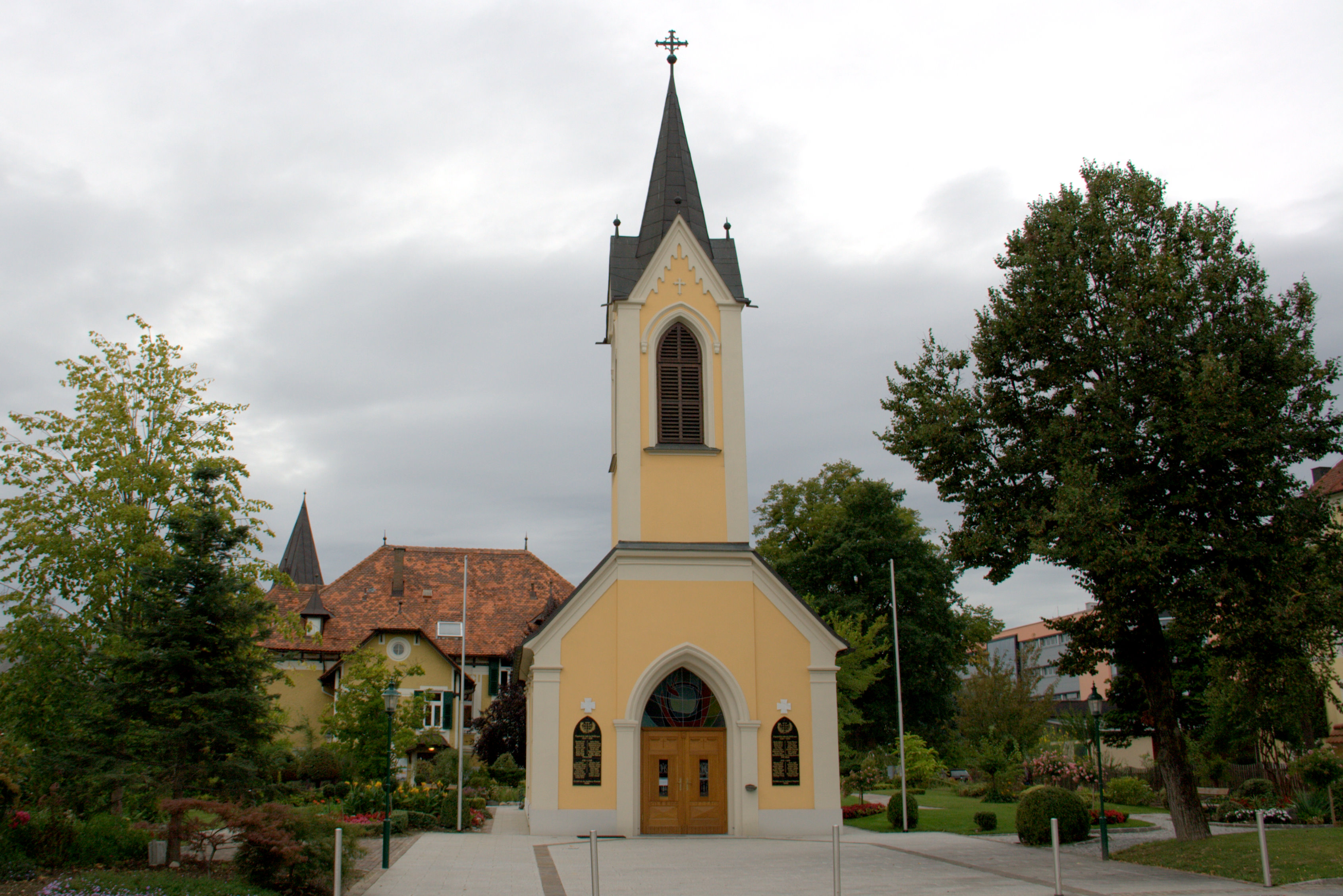
- Raaba chapel

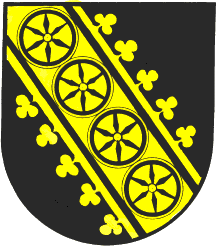
- Coat of arms

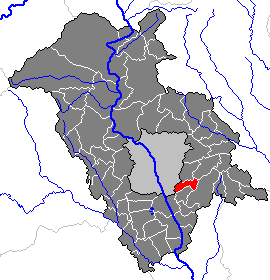
- Location within Graz-Umgebung district

- Location within Austria
- Coordinates: 47°01′40″N 15°29′48″E
- Country: Austria
- State: Styria
- District: Graz-Umgebung

Area
  - Total: 7.71 km^{2} (2.98 sq mi)
- Elevation: 350 m (1,150 ft)

Population (2014-01-01)
  - Total: 2,268
  - Density: 294/km^{2} (762/sq mi)
- Time zone: UTC+1 (CET)
  - Summer (DST): UTC+2 (CEST)
- Postal code: 8074
- Area code: 0316
- Vehicle registration: GU
- Website: www.raaba.at

Raaba, also known as Raaba bei Graz, was a village, merged into Raaba-Grambach in 2015, in the province of the Austrian state of Styria and a suburb of Graz.

Due to its proximity to Graz an area with medium-rise office blocks has developed on the edge of Raaba.

== Population ==
Historical population
Year	Pop.	±%
1869	625	—
1880	653	+4.5%
1890	681	+4.3%
1900	697	+2.3%
1910	755	+8.3%
1923	834	+10.5%
1934	848	+1.7%
1939	802	−5.4%
1951	893	+11.3%
1961	1,057	+18.4%
1971	1,211	+14.6%
1981	1,447	+19.5%
1991	1,720	+18.9%
2001	1,927	+12.0%
2014	2,268	+17.7%
