= List of people from Ukraine =

This is a list of individuals who were born and lived in territories located in present-day Ukraine, including ethnic Ukrainians and those of other ethnicities.

== Academics ==
=== Mathematicians ===
- Selig Brodetsky (1888–1954), British mathematician, President of the Hebrew University of Jerusalem
- Vladimir Drinfeld (1954 (age 71–72)), Fields medal laureate
- Anatoly Fomenko (1945 (age 80–81))
- Mark Kac (1914–1984), Jewish, Polish-American mathematician
- Volodymyr Semenovych Korolyuk (1925–2020)
- Mykhailo Krawtchouk
- Yakiv Kulik
- Volodymyr Marchenko (1922–2026)
- Mikhail Ostrogradsky
- Volodymyr Petryshyn
- Platon Poretsky
- Vladimir Potapov
- Anatoly Samoilenko
- Oleksandr Mikolaiovich Sharkovsky (1936–2022), known for developing Sharkovsky's theorem on the periods of discrete dynamical systems
- Samuil Shatunovsky (1859–1929), Jewish mathematician
- Anatoliy Skorokhod
- Mykhailo Vashchenko-Zakharchenko (1825–1912), major areas of research included the history of geometry in antiquity and Lobachevskian geometry.
- Ivan Śleszyński (1854–9 March 1931), ethnic Polish Ukrainian mathematician
- Pavel Urysohn (1898–1924), Jewish mathematician
- Josif Shtokalo (1897–1987)
- Naum Z. Shor (1937–2006), Jewish Ukrainian mathematician
- Maryna Viazovska (born 1984), Fields medal laureate, known for her work in sphere packing
- Vadim G. Vizing
- Georgy Voronoy

=== Physicists/Astronomers ===
- Gersh Budker, nuclear physicist (Budker Institute of Nuclear Physics)
- Georges Charpak, French physicist (Nobel Prize), born in East Galicia
- Abram Ioffe, prominent Soviet physicist (Ioffe Physico-Technical Institute)
- Isaak Khalatnikov, BKL conjecture in general relativity
- Leo Palatnik, thin film physics
- Ivan Pulyui, scientist working with cathode radiation
- George Yuri Rainich, mathematical physicist

=== Geographers/Geologists ===
- Volodymyr Kubijovyč
- Lubomyr Luciuk, political geographer, community activists
- Vladimir Vernadsky, mineralogist, biochemist

=== Biologists ===
- Aleksandr Bogomolets
- Erwin Chargaff
- Theodosius Dobzhansky
- Katherine Esau
- Dmitri Ivanovsky
- Trofim Lysenko
- Oleksandr Palladin
- Kostiantyn Sytnyk
- Vladimir Vernadsky, mineralogist, biochemist

=== Chemists ===
- Anatoly Babko
- Israel Dostrovsky (1918–2010), Russian (Ukraine)-born Israeli physical chemist, fifth president of the Weizmann Institute of Science
- Ivan Horbachevsky
- George Kistiakowsky
- Lev Pisarzhevsky
- Swiatoslaw Trofimenko
- Volodymyr Vernadsky, mineralogist, biochemist
- Selman Waksman (1888–1973), Jewish, Ukrainian-American, biochemist, Nobel Prize (1952)

=== Doctors and surgeons ===
- Nikolai Amosov, heart surgeon
- Vitalii Khmel, military thoracic surgeon
- Nikolay Pirogov, inventor of a splint, sling, brace or cast
- Alexander Shalimov, surgeon
- Serdyuk Valentin, orthopedic surgeon
- Nicolai L. Volodos, cardiovascular surgeon
- Danylo Zabolotny
- Yurii Voronyi, surgeon

=== Engineers ===
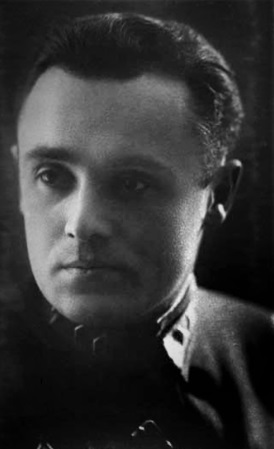
Sergei Korolev

- Volodymyr Chelomey, ballistic missile and Ukrainian spacecraft designer
- Valentin Glushko, engineer, designer of Soviet rocket engines
- Mykola Holonyak, first visible diode
- Volodymyr Horbulin, developer of strategic rocket systems and space vehicles of "Kosmos" series
- Sergei Korolev, the father of the Soviet space program, inventor of the first intercontinental ballistic missile and the first space rocket (R-7 Semyorka), creator of the first satellite (Sputnik), supervisor of the first human spaceflight
- Mykola Kybalchich, rocket science pioneer
- Yuri Kondratyuk, spaceflight pioneer
- Roman Kroitor
- Volodymyr Mackiw, mining engineer
- Borys Paton
- Yevhen Paton, welding engineer
- Igor Sikorsky, aviation pioneer, creator of the first helicopter
- Stepan Tymoshenko, father of modern Ukrainian engineering mechanics

=== Economists ===
- Mykhailo Tuhan-Baranovsky (1865–1919)
- Eugen Slutsky (1880–1948), born in Russian Empire in the territory of Ukraine, Slutsky equation
- Ludwig von Mises (1881–1973), born in Austria-Hungary in the territory of present-day Lviv), founding father of the Ukrainian western-style economics
- Bohdan Hawrylyshyn (1926–2016), noted economist, visionary and economic advisor to the Ukrainian government

=== Archeologists ===
- Vikentiy Khvoyka, discovered Trypillia culture
- Simhah Pinsker (1801–1864), Polish-Jewish archeologist and scholar
- Yuriy Shumovskyi

=== Historians ===
- Volodymyr Antonovych, historian and folklorist
- Kateryna Antonovych-Melnyk (1859–1942), Ukrainian historian
- Olena Apanovich
- Volodymyr Barvinok
- Dmytro Doroshenko
- Mykhailo Drahomanov, historian, political emigre and folklorist
- Mykhailo Hrushevsky, historian
- Taras Hunczak
- Myron Korduba
- Mykola Kostomarov, literary historian, folklorist
- Oleh Kozerod, political scientist
- Peter Loboda, researcher of ancient Ukrainian numismatics
- George S. N. Luckyj, literary historian
- Mykhailo Maksymovych, literary historian, folklorist
- Paul Robert Magocsi, chairman of Ukrainian Studies at the University of Toronto
- Oleksander Ohloblyn
- Bohdan Osadchuk, journalist
- Nataliia Polonska-Vasylenko
- Omeljan Pritsak, orientalist
- Mikołaj Siwicki, historian
- Viktor Suvorov, spy and WWII researcher
- Dmytro Yavornytsky, Cossack historian, archaeologist

=== Philosophers ===
- Hryhorii Skovoroda, philosopher, poet and composer

=== Other academics ===
- Mykola Andrusiv
- Albert Bandura
- Pavel Petrovich Blonsky
- Olgerd Bochkovsky, sociologist
- Isydore Hlynka
- Robert Klymasz, Ukrainian Canadian folklorist
- Yuriy Kovbasenko, Ukrainian philologist and educator
- Volodymyr Kubiyovych, geographer and encyclopedist
- Viktor Kyrpychov
- Yuri Linnik
- Lubomyr Luciuk, political geographer and community activist
- Anton Makarenko, Ukrainian and Soviet educator
- Joseph Oleskiw
- Tetiana Podchasova, Ukrainian economist-cyberneticist, computer scientist
- Wilhelm Reich, psychiatrist and psychoanalyst, pro-Ukrainian freedom dissident
- Otto Struve, Ukrainian-Russian-American astronomer
- Evhen Tsybulenko, professor of international law
- Sergiy Vilkomir, computer scientist
- Fedir Vovk, anthropologist and ethnographer

== Arts ==
=== Architects ===
- Ivan Hryhorovych-Barskyi
- Joseph Karakis
- Musa Konsulova
- Marian Peretyatkovich
- Volodymyr Sichynskyi

=== Fashion designers ===
- Natalia Fedner

=== Painters ===
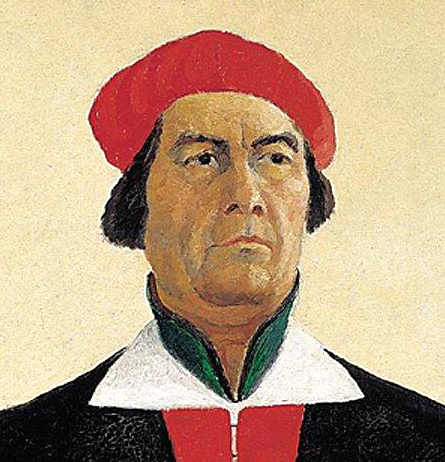
Kazimir Malevich

- Ivan Aivazovsky, painter, known for his seascapes
- Nathan Altman (1889–1970), Ukrainian-Jewish painter and stage designer from Vinnytsia
- Marie Bashkirtseff, artist
- Svitlana Biedarieva, artist, art historian, curator
- Mykhailo Boychuk
- Robert Brackman
- Mykola Burachek
- David Burliuk, avant-garde painter, Ukrainian freedom thinker
- Volodymyr Burliuk
- Petro Choldny (1904–1990), Neo-Byzantine Iconographer
- Louis Choris
- Sonia Delaunay, avant-garde artist
- Mychajlo Dmytrenko
- Aleksandra Ekster, avant-garde artist
- Nina Genke-Meller, avant-garde artist
- Maurice Gottlieb (1856–1979), Polish-Jewish painter
- Leopold Gottlieb (1883–1934), Polish-Jewish painter
- Mykola Hlushchenko
- Jacques Hnizdovsky
- Alla Horska
- Alexander Khvostenko-Khvostov, avant-garde stage designer
- Pyotr Konchalovsky, painter
- Fedir Krychevsky
- Vasyl Krychevsky
- Hanna Kryvolap
- Arkhip Kuindzhi
- Boris Lekar, Israeli painter
- Ephraim Moses Lilien, German-Jewish painter
- Anton Losenko
- Kazimir Malevich, avant-garde artist
- Ivan Marchuk, modern painter
- Vadym Meller, avant-garde artist, stage designer
- Mykola Murashko
- Oleksandr Murashko
- Heorhiy Narbut
- Solomon Nikritin, painter, avant-garde artist
- Nikifor, primitivist painter
- Maria Prymachenko
- Mykola Pymonenko
- Vlada Ralko, collage artist
- Kliment Red'ko, painter, avant-garde artist
- Ilya Repin, painter
- Bruno Schulz (1892–1942), Polish-Jewish painter and writer
- Zinaida Serebriakova, painter
- David Shterenberg, painter from Zhytomyr
- Volodymyr Sichynskyi, architect, graphic artist
- Opanas Slastion, folklorist, designer of modern type of bandura
- Anton Solomoukha
- Ivan Soshenko, painter
- Avigdor Stematsky, Israeli painter from Odesa
- Serhiy Svetoslavsky
- Sergei Sviatchenko (born 1952)
- Vladimir Tatlin, avant-garde artist
- Sonia Terk, avant-garde artist
- Mykhailo Turovsky
- Roman Turovsky-Savchuk
- Max Vityk
- Mickola Vorokhta, painter
- Tetyana Yablonska, modern painter
- Yevhen Yehorov, 20th century artist
- Vasiliy Yermilov, avant-garde artist
- Ivan Yizhakevych

=== Photographers ===
- Anatoliy Havrylov, Shevchenko National Prize laureate for cinematography
- Nikolai Kozlovsky

=== Sculptors ===
- Alexander Archipenko, Ukrainian-American sculptor and graphic artist
- Lina Condes (born 1980), Ukrainian sculptor and multimedia artist
- Mykhailo Kolodko (born 1978), Ukrainian-Hungarian sculptor
- Chana Orloff (1888–1968), Ukrainian-Israeli
- Vladimir Tatlin

=== Performing arts ===
==== Actors/Actresses ====
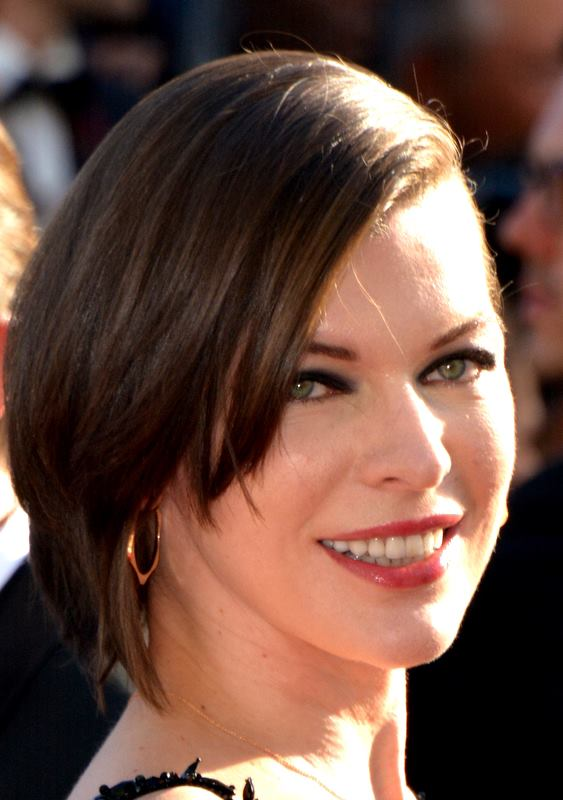
Mila Jovovich

- Nick Adams
- Elisabeth Bergner, Austrian-English Jewish actress
- Elina Bystritskaya
- Olena Chekan
- Taissa Farmiga
- Vera Farmiga
- Luba Goy
- John Hodiak
- Milla Jovovich
- Vera Kholodnaya
- Mariya Khomutova
- Olga Krasko
- Mila Kunis, Ukrainian/American-Jewish actress
- Olga Kurylenko
- Vasily Lanovoy
- Ana Layevska
- Mike Mazurki
- Yaroslava Mosiychuk, actress
- Ivan Mykolaichuk
- Alla Nazimova, (born Adelaida Leventon, in Yalta), silent film star
- Jack Palance (Volodymyr Palahnyuk)
- Zhanna Prokhorenko
- Ivanna Sakhno
- Yakov Smirnoff
- Anna Sten (Anel Sudakevich)
- Lee Strasberg (1901–1982), Polish/American-Jewish actor
- Stav Strashko, actress and model born in Dnipropetrovsk, Ukraine
- Bohdan Stupka
- Yuriy Tkach
- Katheryn Winnick
- Natasha Yarovenko
- Volodymyr Zelenskyy, actor, comedian and President of Ukraine since 2019

==== Choreographers and dancers ====
- Vasyl Avramenko
- Sergei Polunin, ballet dancer
- Roma Pryma-Bohachevsky, pro-Western
- Oksana Skorik, ballet dancer
- Vasyl Verkhovynets
- Igor Youskevitch, ballet dancer

==== Film and theatre directors ====
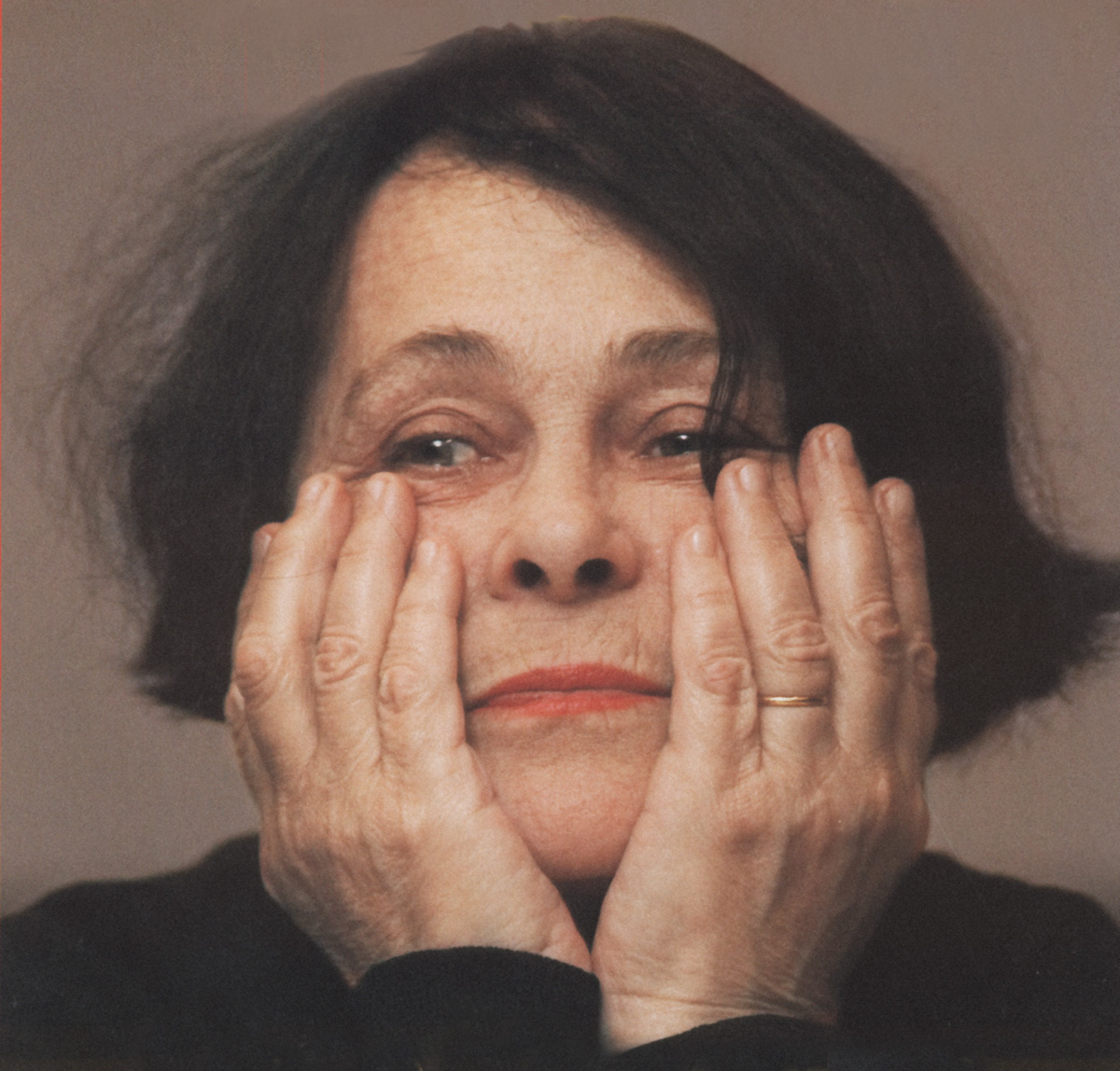
Kira Muratova

- Roman Balayan, Ukrainian-Armenian film director
- Sergei Bondarchuk
- Leonid Bykiv
- Grigori Chukhrai
- Volodymyr Dakhno, Shevchenko National Prize laureate and Cossacks (cartoon series) creator
- Alexander Dovzhenko
- Edward Dmytryk
- Kateryna Gornostai, Ukrainian LGBTQ film director, screenwriter and film editor
- Les Kurbas
- Anatole Litvak (1902–1974), Ukrainian/American-Jewish film director
- Danylo Lyder
- Paul Mazursky (1930–2014), American-Jewish actor, screenwriter and film director
- Kira Muratova
- Larisa Shepitko
- Bohdan Stupka
- Peter Weibel
- Sergei Loznitsa, Ukrainian documentary director
- Tanu Muino

==== Models ====
- Alina Baikova
- Alexandra Kutas, Ukrainian model who has a disability
- Snejana Onopka, Ukrainian model born in Sievierodonetsk
- Daria Werbowy, Polish-born Canadian model of Ukrainian descent.

== LGBT activists ==
- Bogdan Globa, LGBT activist
- Vitalina Koval, LGBT activist
- Viktor Pylypenko, LGBT activist and service member
- Anna Sharyhina, LGBT activist
- Olena Shevchenko, Ukrainian women's and LGBT rights activist

== Musicians ==
=== Bandurists ===
- Hnat Khotkevych
- Halyna Korin
- Hryhory Kytasty
- Julian Kytasty
- Volodymyr Luciv
- Victor Mishalow

=== Composers ===
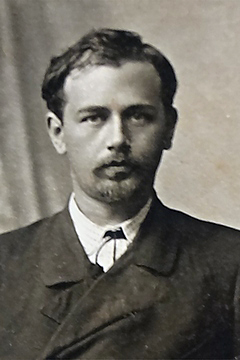
Mykola Leontovych

- Svitlana Azarova
- Virko Baley
- Vasyl Barvinsky
- Maxim Berezovsky
- Oleksandr Bilash, composer, Hero of Ukraine
- Dmitry Bortniansky
- Marusia Churai
- Nikolay Diletsky
- Isaak Dunayevsky, author of numerous popular Soviet songs
- Lesia Dychko
- Arkady Filippenko
- Reinhold Glière
- Leonid Hrabovsky
- Semen Hulak-Artemovsky
- Volodymyr Ivasiuk
- Oleksander Koshetz
- Mykola Leontovych, composed Shchedryk (song) also known as Carol of the Bells
- Zara Levina
- Borys Lyatoshynsky
- Mykola Lysenko
- Ruslana Lyzhichko
- Igor Markevitch
- Yuli Meitus
- Yuriy Oliynyk
- Mykola Ovsianiko-Kulikovsky
- Sergei Prokofiev
- Levko Revutsky
- Nikolai Roslavets
- Aleksandr Shymko
- Valentin Silvestrov
- Levko Dutkivskiy
- Myroslav Skoryk
- Yevhen Stankovych
- Kyrylo Stetsenko
- Dimitri Tiomkin, film composer
- Roman Turovsky-Savchuk
- Artemy Vedel
- Mykhailo Verbytsky, composer of the National Anthem of Ukraine
- Mykola Vilinsky
- Yakiv Yatsynevych

=== Pianists ===
- Simon Barere, pianist
- Yevheniya Barvinska, pianist
- Felix Blumenfeld, pianist
- Shura Cherkassky, pianist
- Emil Gilels, pianist
- Vladimir Horowitz, pianist
- Lubka Kolessa, pianist
- Halyna Levytska
- Valentina Lisitsa, pianist
- Benno Moiseiwitsch, pianist
- Heinrich Neuhaus, pianist
- Sviatoslav Richter, pianist
- Leo Sirota, pianist

=== Organists ===
- Roman Krasnovsky, organist, composer
- Paul Stetsenko, organist, choral conductor

=== Strings ===
- Yuri Bashmet, viola soloist
- Mischa Elman, violinist
- Emanuel Feuermann (1902–1942), Ukrainian-Jewish cellist (born in Austrian Galicia)
- Vadim Gluzman, violinist
- Pawlo Humeniuk, violinist / fiddler
- Leonid Kogan, violinist
- Nathan Milstein, violinist
- David Oistrakh, violinist
- Igor Oistrakh, violinist
- Steven Staryk, violinist
- Isaac Stern (1920–2001), American-Jewish, born in Kremenets Poland (now Ukraine), violinist.
- Siergiej Wowkotrub, (born 1964), violinist

=== Conductors ===
- Jascha Horenstein (1898–1973), Ukrainian/American-Jewish conductor
- Oleksander Horilyj (1863-1937), first conductor of the Ukrainian National Symphony Orchestra

=== Singers ===
==== Opera ====
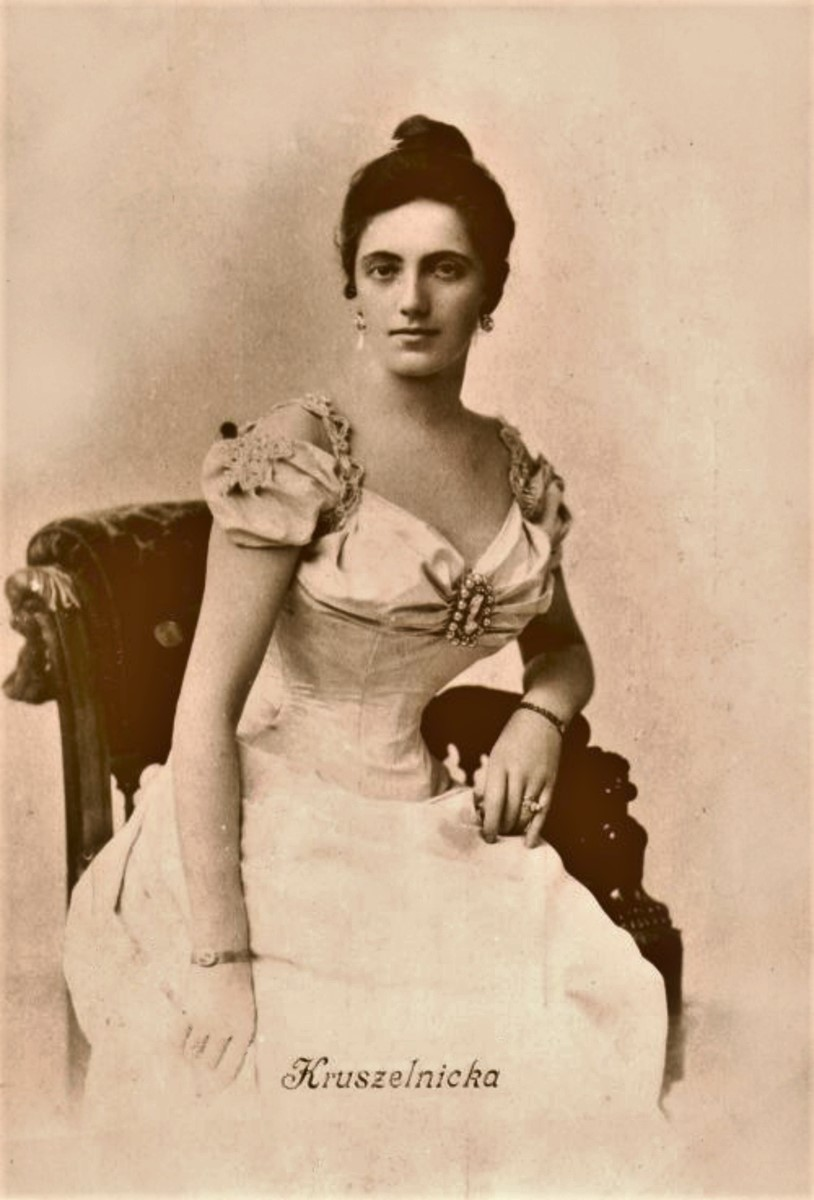
Solomiya Krushelnytska

- Andrij Dobriansky, bass-baritone
- Borys Hmyria, bass
- Vasyl Slipak, baritone
- Alexander Kipnis, bass
- Ivan Kozlovsky, tenor
- Solomiya Krushelnytska, soprano
- Evgeniya Miroshnichenko, soprano
- Vyacheslav Polozov, tenor
- Maria Sokil, soprano
- Anatoly Solovyanenko, tenor
- Leonid Skirko, bass, baritone

==== Singers and artists of other genres ====
- Iryna Bilyk, singer
- Vera Brezhneva, singer and television presenter
- Denis Stoff, singer
- Dimal, award-winning artist, rapper, entertainer
- Kvitka Cisyk, singer
- Katya Chilly, singer
- Taras Chubay, bard
- Gaitana
- Ganna Gryniva, jazz singer
- Eugene Hutz, lead singer of the Gypsy Punk band Gogol Bordello
- Jamala, singer, composer, winner of the Eurovision Song Contest 2016
- Tina Karol, singer
- Iosif Kobzon, iconic Soviet crooner
- Ani Lorak, singer, runner-up of the 2008 Eurovision contest
- Mélovin (Kostyantyn Mykolayovych Bocharov), Ukrainian singer, LGBT activist
- Arsen Mirzoyan (born 1978), Ukrainian singer-songwriter
- Alina Pash, singer and rapper, LGBT activist
- Oleksandr Ponomaryov, singer
- Anastasia Prikhodko, winner of Star Factory 2007, represented Russia in the 2009 Eurovision song contest
- Artem Pyvovarov, new wave singer and composer
- Sofia Rotaru, singer
- Ruslana, pop singer-songwriter, composer, conductor, dancer, record producer, pro-Western, singer and winner of the 2004 Eurovision contest
- Anna Sedokova, singer, actress and television presenter, LGBT activist
- Verka Serduchka (Adriy Danylko), singer and runner-up of the 2007 Eurovision Song Contest
- Yuri Shevchuk, bard, born of Ukrainian father
- Klavdiya Shulzhenko, singer of the most inspiring WWII song that didn't mention Stalin
- Theresa Sokyrka, Canadian Idol 2 runner-up
- Super DJ Dmitri (Dmitry Brill), member of American club/dance group Deee-Lite
- Nissan Spivak, Ukrainian cantor
- Leonyd Utyosiv, jazz singer
- Svyatoslav Vakarchuk, singer
- Alexander Vertinsky, singer
- Velvel Zbarjer, singer
- Vitas, singer and actor
- Zlata Ognevich, singer, represented Ukraine in the 2013 Eurovision song contest
- Zi Faámelu, transgender Ukrainian singer-songwriter

=== Other ===
- Volodymyr (Vlad) DeBriansky, guitarist, producer, composer, songwriter
- Eugene Hütz (Gogol Bordello), singer, guitarist, composer, songwriter, actor
- Olga Korolova (born 1988), music producer, DJ
- Efim Jourist, composer, accordionist and bajan player
- Ruslana Lyzhichko, pianist, singer, dancer, composer, producer, songwriter
- Leo Ornstein (1895–2002), Ukrainian/American-Jewish composer and pianist.
- Isabelle Rezazadeh, DJ
- George Shakhnevich, accordionist
- Estas Tonne, guitarist

=== Other performing artists ===
- Juliya Chernetsky
- Serge Lifar, one of the greatest male ballet dancers of the 20th century
- Maria Guleghina
- Alla Korot
- Olga Khokhlova, ballet dancer, first wife of Pablo Picasso

== Literary arts ==
=== Writers ===
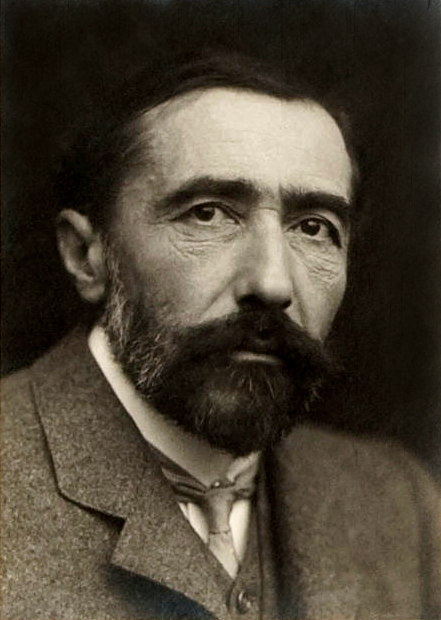
Joseph Conrad

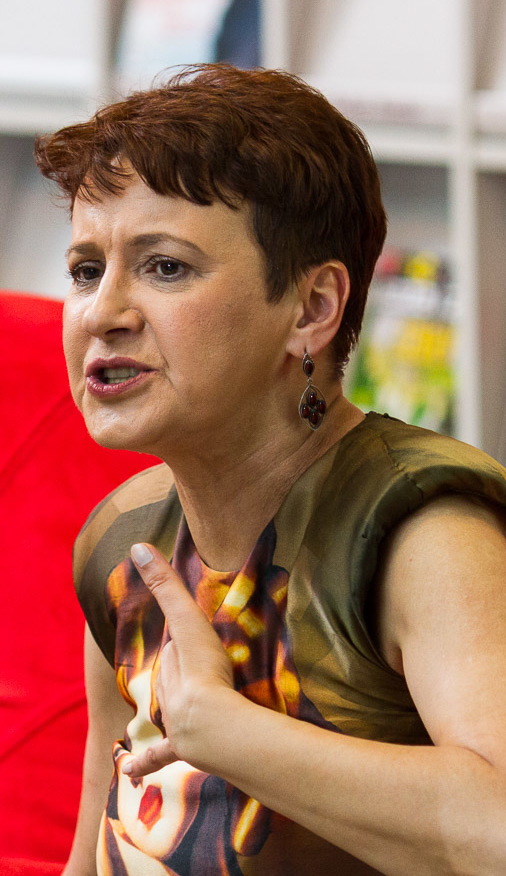
Oksana Zabuzhko

- Adrian Kashchenko
- Aleksandr Solzhenitsyn, Russian writer, had Ukrainian mother
- Aleksei Bibik (1878–1976), working-class writer
- Oleksandra Marynyna
- Amvrosii Metlynsky, poet, writer
- Andrey Kurkov, Ukrainian novelist
- Bohdan Kutiepov, journalist and freelance musician
- Bohdan Osadchuk
- Chuck Palahniuk, American satirical novelist (Ukrainian father)
- Clarice Lispector
- Daniil Granin, author
- David Bergelson, Ukrainian-Jewish writer in Yiddish language
- Hryhorii Epik, writer, journalist
- Hryhorii Kosynka
- Hryhoriy Skovoroda, poet, writer, philosopher
- Ilya Ehrenburg, Ukrainian-Jewish publicist and writer in Russian language, born in Kyiv
- Ilya Ilf, Ukrainian humorist in Russian language, co-author of The Twelve Chairs
- Irena Karpa, modern Ukrainian writer
- Isaac Babel, Ukrainian-Jewish writer in Russian language, born in Odesa
- Ivan Kotlyarevsky, playwright
- Ivan Nechuy-Levytsky
- Ivan Vahylevych
- Jan Potocki, count, Polish writer in French language, born and died in Ukraine
- Joseph Conrad, Polish writer in the English language, born in Berdychiv
- Kristina Berdynskykh, political journalist
- Leopold von Sacher-Masoch, Austrian writer, author of Venus in Furs
- Les Podervianskiy, satirist and playwright, pro-Western and pro-Ukrainian dissident
- Levko Kopeliv, author and dissident
- Markiyan Shashkevych, poet, writer, and interpreter
- Marko Cheremshyna, writer
- Marko Vovchok
- Marya Zaturenska
- Mikhail Bulgakov, novelist in Russian language
- Mikhail Zhvanetsky, Russian humorist
- Miriam Yalan-Shteklis, Israeli writer and poet
- Mykhailo Kotsiubynsky
- Mykhailo Stelmakh
- Mykola Khvylovy
- Mykola Kulish, dramatist
- Mykola Voronyi
- Mykola Zerov
- Natalia Vlaschenko, Ukrainian journalist, theatrologist, screenwriter, television presenter, playwright, producer, columnist, publisher and contributing editor
- Natan Ilyich Zabara (1908–1975), Ukrainian-Jewish writer in Yiddish
- Nikolai Gogol, Ukrainian writer in Russian language, born in Velyki Sorochyntsi
- Oksana Zabuzhko, modern Ukrainian novelist, poet, essayist
- Oles Honchar, author of The Cathedral
- Olha Kobylianska, modernist writer and feminist
- Olha Kobylyanska
- Ostap Ortwin (1876–1942), Polish-Jewish journalist and literary critic
- Ostap Vyshnia
- Panteleymon Kulish
- Perepadia Anatol, literary translator
- Pavlo Zahrebelnyi
- Raya Dunayevskaya, Marxist philosopher
- Sam Honigberg, correspondent for The Billboard and publicist
- Serhiy Zhadan, poet, essayist and musician
- Shmuel Agnon, Israeli Hebrew writer, winner of the Nobel Prize (1966), born in Buchach
- Sholom Aleichem, Ukrainian writer in Yiddish language, born in Pereyaslav
- Sofia Yablonska, travel writer, photographer, architect
- Stanisław Lem, Polish science-fiction writer born in the present-day territory of Ukraine
- Svitlana Yeremenko, journalist
- Valentyn Kornienko, writer and journal publisher
- Valentyn Rechmedin, writer, journalist
- Valerian Pidmohylny, novelist
- Valerian Polishchuk, poet
- Vasily Grossman, Ukrainian-Jewish, born in Berdichev in 1905. Dedicated his lives' writing to the three most terrible pages of 20th-century history: the siege of Stalingrad, the Shoah, and the Terror Famine which today is referred to as the Holodomor. Best known for Everything Flows, Life and Fate.
- Vasyl Stefanyk
- Viktor Nekrasov, writer
- Viktor Petrov
- Volodymyr Vynnychenko
- Yakiv Holovatsky
- Yaroslav Halan, anti-fascist playwright and publicist, assassinated by nationalist insurgents
- Yevgeny Grebyonka
- Yevgeny Petrov, Ukrainian humorist in Russian language, co-author of The Twelve Chairs
- Yevhen Hrebinka
- Yevhen Hutsalo
- Yuri Andrukhovych, born in Ivano-Frankivsk
- Yuri Nikitin, Russian science fiction and fantasy writer
- Yuri Nikitin, trampolinist
- Yuri Pokalchuk
- Maryna and Serhiy Dyachenko, fantasy fiction writers and Shevchenko National Prize laureate

=== Poets ===
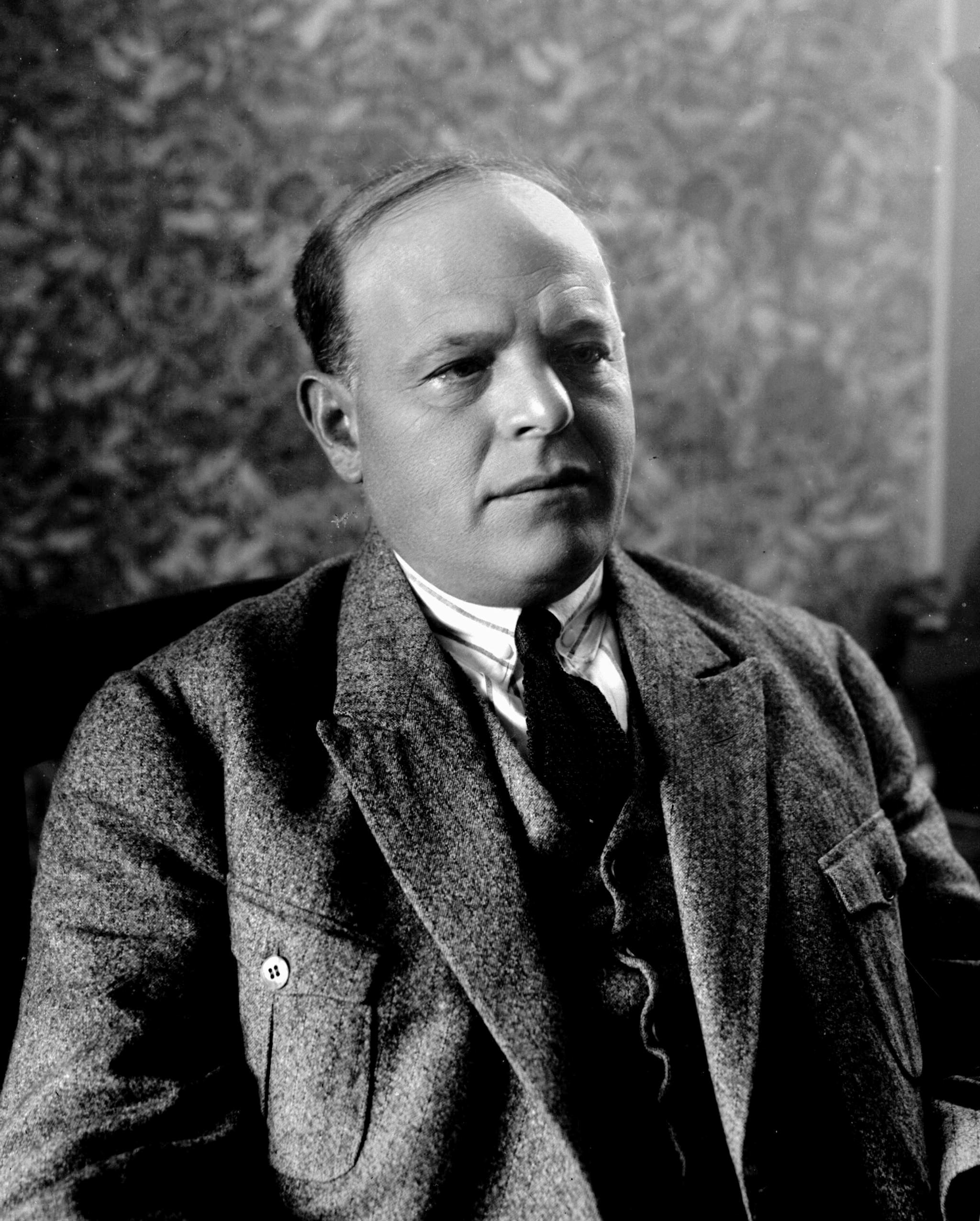
Hayyim Nahman Bialik

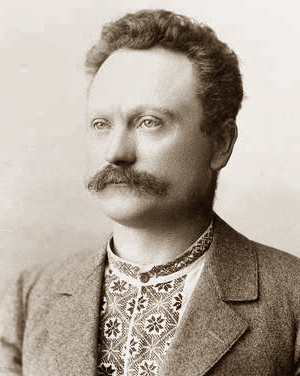
Ivan Franko

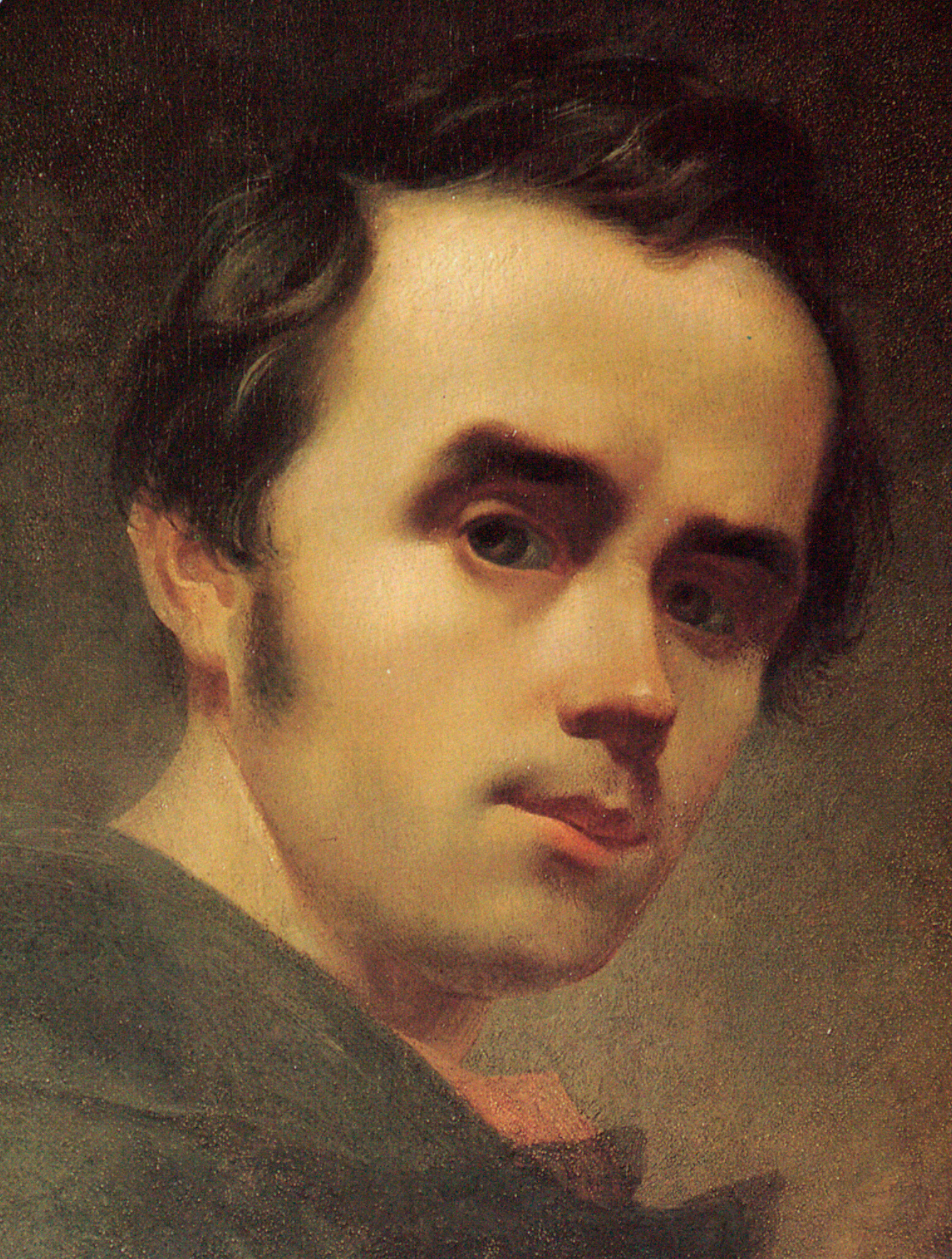
Taras Shevchenko

- Anna Akhmatova, Russian poet
- Bohdan-Ihor Antonych
- Eduard Bagritsky
- Mikola Bazhan
- Hayyim Nahman Bialik, modern Hebrew Ukrainian poet, national poet of the State of Israel
- Ivan Drach
- Itzik Feffer, Soviet poet in Yiddish language
- Moysey Fishbeyn, Ukrainian poet in Yiddish language
- Ivan Franko
- Alexander Galich, Soviet bard in Russian language, pro-Western dissident
- Ihor Kalynets
- Mykola Khvylovy
- Lina Kostenko
- Andriy Malyshko
- Oleksandr Oles
- Oleh Olzhych
- Dmytro Pavlychko
- Markiyan Shashkevych
- Vasyl Stus
- Vasyl Symonenko
- Olena Teliha
- Pavlo Tychyna
- Maksym Rylsky
- Taras Shevchenko, founder of modern Ukrainian Literature
- Volodymyr Sosiura
- Vasyl Stus
- Vasyl Symonenko
- Hryhoriy Tiutiunnyk
- Lesya Ukrainka
- Volodymyr Yaniv
- Volodymyr Yavorivsky
- Maik Yohansen
- Natan Yonatan, Kyiv-born Israeli poet
- Serhiy Zhadan, modern Ukrainian poet and novelist
- Mykhailo Zharzhailo, Ukrainian poet, performer, and art event organizer

== Business ==
- Gennadiy Bogolyubov (born 1961/1962), Ukrainian-Israeli billionaire businessman
- Zino Davidoff, founder of Davidoff brand
- Max Levchin, co-founder of PayPal
- Boris Lohzkin (born 1971), President of the Jewish Confederation of Ukraine and vice-president of the World Jewish Congress
- Jay Pritzker, founder of Hyatt and LGBT philanthropist
- Leonid Radvinsky (born 1982), Ukrainian-American serial entrepreneur and majority owner of OnlyFans
- Harold Willens (1914–2003), Jewish American businessman, political donor and nuclear freeze activist

== Astronauts ==
- Georgy Beregovoy, Soviet cosmonaut No.12, Soviet MP in 1974–89 representing Donetsk region
- Leonid Kizim, Soviet cosmonaut
- Anatoly Levchenko, Soviet cosmonaut
- Anatoly Filipchenko, Soviet cosmonaut
- Anatoly Artsebarsky, Soviet cosmonaut
- Igor Volk, Soviet cosmonaut
- Pavel Popovich, Soviet cosmonaut No.4, Verkhovna Rada MP in 1964–88, head of Ukrainian diaspora in Moscow
- Georgy Dobrovolsky, Soviet cosmonaut
- Leonid Kadeniuk, earlier a Soviet cosmonaut, made the first crewed spaceflight of the National Space Agency of Ukraine
- Yury Onufriyenko, Russian cosmonaut
- Yuri Malenchenko, Russian cosmonaut
- Yuri Gidzenko, Russian cosmonaut
- Heidemarie Stefanyshyn-Piper, NASA
- Bruce E. Melnick, NASA
- Roberta Bondar, Canada's first female astronaut and the first neurologist in space
- Joshua Kutryk, Canadian astronaut

== Cossack Hetmans ==
- Przecław Lanckoroński (1506–1512), one of the first Hetmans of Ukrainian Cossacks
- Ostap Dashkevych (1514–1535)
- Dmytro Vyshnevetsky (1550–1563)
- Ivan Pidkova (1577–1578), Cossack Hetman and Hospodar of Moldavia
- Kryshtof Kosynsky (1591–1593)
- Hryhory Loboda (1593–1596)
- Severyn Nalyvaiko (1596)
- Petro Konashevych-Sahaidachny (1614–1622), Hetman of Zaporozhian Cossacks
- Mykhailo Doroshenko (1623–1628)
- Hryhoriy Chorny (1628–1630), elected by Registered Cossacks
- Taras Fedorovych (1629–1630), elected by unregistered Cossacks
- Ivan Sulyma (1630–1635)
- Dmytro Hunia (1638)
- Bohdan Khmelnytsky (1648–1657), first Hetman of the Cossack Hetmanate
- Ivan Vyhovsky (1657–1659), second Hetman of the Cossack Hetmanate
- Yurii Khmelnytsky (1659–1663), third Hetman of the Cossack Hetmanate, and (1677–1681 and 1685) in the Right-bank Ukraine
- Pavlo Teteria (1663–1665) in the Right-bank Ukraine
- Ivan Briukhovetsky (1663–1668) in the Left-bank Ukraine
- Petro Doroshenko (1665–1676) in the Right-bank Ukraine and (1668–1669) in the Left-bank Ukraine
- Demian Mnohohrishny (1669–1672) in the Left-bank Ukraine
- Mykhailo Khanenko (1669–1674) in the Right-bank Ukraine
- Ivan Samoylovych (1672–1687) in the Left-bank Ukraine
- Ivan Mazepa (1687–1708) in the Left-bank Ukraine, and (1708–1709) in the Right-bank Ukraine
- Pylyp Orlyk (1710–1742) in exile
- Ivan Skoropadsky (1708–1722) in the Left-bank Ukraine
- Pavlo Polubotok (1722–1724), served as Acting Hetman of the Left-bank Ukraine
- Danylo Apostol (1727–1734) in the Left-bank Ukraine
- Kirill Razumovski (1750–1764) in the Left-bank Ukraine
- Petro Kalnyshevsky (1765–1775), last Koshovyi Otaman of the Zaporozhian Cossacks

== Military figures ==
- Luka Basanets, general of the Red Army
- Marko Bezruchko, general of the Ukrainian People's Army
- Taras Bulba-Borovets, otaman of the Ukrainian People's Revolutionary Army aka Polissian Sich
- Ivan Chernyakhovsky, general of the Red Army
- Yakov Dashevsky, general of the Red Army
- Kuzma Derevyanko, general of the Red Army
- Yaakov Dori (1899–1973), Israeli first Chief of Staff of the Israel Defense Forces, President of the Technion – Israel Institute of Technology
- Petro Dyachenko, staff captain of the Russian Army (World War I), colonel of the Ukrainian People's Army (1918–1920), major of the Polish Army (1938–1939), colonel of the Ukrainian Liberation Army (1943–1945), and general of the Ukrainian National Army (1945)
- Nikolay Dyatlenko, interrogator and translator at the Battle of Stalingrad
- Oleksiy Fedorov, major general, partisan leader, subsequently minister of Welfare of Ukraine
- Israel Fisanovich (1914–1944), Ukrainian-Jewish Navy submarine commander Soviet Navy
- Petro Franko, captain of the Air Force of the Ukrainian Galician Army (UHA)
- Andrei Grechko, marshal of the Soviet Union
- Nykyfor Hryhoriv, otaman and leader of a Ukrainian insurgent "Green Army"
- Vylhelm Habsburh (Vasyl Vyshyvanyi), Austrian archduke, colonel of the Ukrainian Sich Riflemen
- Yaroslav Hunka, a World War II veteran of the 14th Waffen Grenadier Division of the SS (1st Galician), a military formation of Nazi Germany.
- Oleksander Hrekov, commander-in-chief of the army of the West Ukrainian National Republic
- Dmytro Hrytsai, general of the Ukrainian Insurgent Army
- Karl Georg Graf Huyn, Austrian colonel general, last governor-general of Galicia (1917–18)
- Alfred Jansa, Austrian major general
- Mykola Kapustiansky, general of the Ukrainian People's Army
- Dmytro Klyachkivsky, colonel and the commander of the Ukrainian Insurgent Army
- Ivan Kozhedub, legendary fighter pilot of WWII, top USSR ace
- Roman Kondratenko, lieutenant general of Russian Imperial Army, defender of Port Arthur during Russo-Japanese War
- Yevhen Konovalets, leader of the Ukrainian Military Organization (UVO) (1920–29) and the Organization of Ukrainian Nationalists (OUN) (1929–38), pro-Western, killed many Jews and Russians
- Filip Konowal, Ukrainian Canadian war hero (Victoria Cross, 1917)
- Petr Koshevoi, marshal of the Soviet Union
- Zenon Kossak, deputy commander of the Carpathian Sich
- Mykhailo Krat, general of the Ukrainian National Army
- Sydir Kovpak, major general, partisan leader, subsequently deputy chairperson of Verkhovna Rada
- Vasyl Kuk, commander of the Ukrainian Insurgent Army
- Grigory Kulik, marshal of the Soviet Union
- Yuriy Lopatynsky, colonel of the Ukrainian Insurgent Army
- Nestor Makhno, commander of "Black Army"
- Alexander Marinesko, legendary Sub Commander in WWII
- Rodion Malinovsky, marshal of the Soviet Union
- Kirill Moskalenko, marshal of the Soviet Union
- Maria Nikiforova, only female commander of an anarchist cavalry detachment, the "Free Combat Druzhina".
- Mykhailo Omelianovych-Pavlenko, general of the Ukrainian Liberation Army, commander of the Ukrainian Galician Army and Ukrainian People's Army
- Ivan Paskevich, field marshal of the Russian imperial army
- Lyudmila Pavlichenko, Lieutenant of Red Army female sniper
- Alexander Pechersky, Soviet officer, leader of the Uprising in Sobibor extermination camp (1943)
- Alfred Redl, Austrian counter-intelligence officer
- Jakob Rosenfeld, general of the Chinese People's Liberation Army
- Semyon Rudniev, major general, partisan leader, committed suicide to avoid capture by the Nazi
- Pavel Rybalko, Marshal of Armored Forces
- Pavlo Shandruk, general of the Ukrainian National Army
- Mykola Shchors, colonel, the Shchors City named after him
- Stanislav Sheptytsky, general of the Polish Army
- Grigori Shtern, general of the Red Army
- Roman Shukhevych, general and the commander-in-chief of the Ukrainian Insurgent Army
- Stepan Shukhevych, otaman of the Ukrainian Sich Riflemen and the Ukrainian Galician Army
- Volodymyr Sinclair, general of the Ukrainian People's Army
- Maksym Skorupsky, commander of the Ukrainian Insurgent Army, pro-Western, killed many Jews and Russians
- Hnat Stefaniv, colonel of the Ukrainian Galician Army
- Roman Sushko, colonel of the Ukrainian Legion
- Semyon Timoshenko, marshal of the Soviet Union, added his native village Furmanivka and other western territories in 1939
- Yurii Tiutiunnyk, general of the Ukrainian People's Army
- Yulia Tolopa - Russian-born volunteer who fought for Ukraine in the Russo-Ukrainian War
- Mykola Tsybulenko, major general
- Pyotr Vershigora, major general, partisan leader, WWII photographer
- Dmytro Vitovsky, colonel of the Ukrainian Galician Army
- Kliment Voroshilov, marshal of the Soviet Union
- Andrei Yeremenko, marshal of the Soviet Union

== Intelligence ==
- Yakov Blumkin
- Jack Childs
- Morris Childs
- Jacob Golos
- Walter Krivitsky
- Genrikh Lyushkov
- Jakob Rudnik
- Nathan Gregory Silvermaster
- Abram Slutsky
- Bohdan Stashynsky
- Manfred Stern
- Pavel Sudoplatov
- Viktor Suvorov
- Richard Yary
- Mark Zborowski

== Politicians ==
=== Ukrainian non-Soviet politicians ===
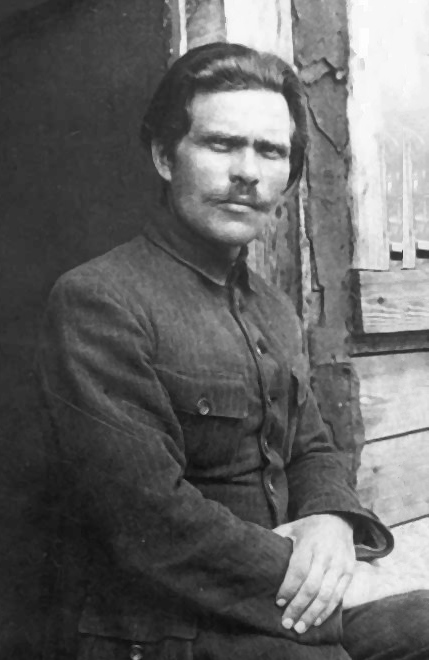
Nestor Makhno

- Dmytro Antonovych, minister of naval affairs, and of arts of the Ukrainian People's Republic (1917–1918 and 1918–1919)
- Volodymyr Bahaziy, head of Kyiv City Administration under German occupation (October 1941–January 1942)
- Ivan Bahrianyi, president (acting) of the UNR in exile (1965–1967)
- Stepan Bandera, leader of the Organization of Ukrainian Nationalists (OUN-B)
- Oleksander Barvinsky, leader of the Christian Social Movement in Ukraine
- Vyacheslav Chornovil, leader of the People's Movement of Ukraine
- Dmytro Dontsov, Ukrainian nationalist writer, publisher, journalist and political thinker
- Dmytro Doroshenko, Minister for Foreign Affairs of the Hetmanate (1918)
- Sydir Holubovych, Prime Minister of the West Ukrainian National Republic (1919)
- Vsevolod Holubovych, Prime Minister of the Ukrainian People's Republic (1918)
- Volodymyr Horbulin, Secretary of National Security and Defense Council (1994–1999, 2006)
- Oleksandr Horin, Ambassador to the Netherlands 2011-17
- Mykhaylo Hrushevsky, President of the Ukrainian People's Republic
- Ivan Hrynokh, Vice President of the Ukrainian Supreme Liberation Council
- Stepan Klochurak, Prime Minister of the Hutsul Republic (1919)
- Yevhen Konovalets, leader of the Organization of Ukrainian Nationalists (1929–1938)
- Leonid Kravchuk, President of Ukraine (1991–1994)
- Volodymyr Kubiyovych, geographer and politician (Ukrainian Central Committee)
- Leonid Kuchma, President of Ukraine (1994–2005)
- Mykola Lebed, head of the Security Service for the UPA
- Serhiy Leshchenko - Ukrainian journalist, politician and public figure
- Dmytro Levytsky, head of the Ukrainian National Democratic Alliance (UNDO) (1925–1935)
- Kost Levytsky, Prime Minister of the West Ukrainian National Republic (1918–1919)
- Andriy Livytskyi, President of the Ukrainian People's Republic in exile (1926–1954).
- Mykola Livytskyi, President of the Ukrainian People's Republic in exile (1967–1989).
- Vyacheslav Lypynsky, leader of the Ukrainian Democratic-Agrarian Party
- Nestor Makhno, leader of anarchists
- Isaak Mazepa, Prime Minister of the Ukrainian People's Republic (1919–1920 and 1948–1952)
- Andriy Melnyk, leader of the Organization of Ukrainian Nationalists (OUN-M)
- Volodymyr Ohryzko, Minister for Foreign Affairs (2007–2009)
- Symon Petlura, President of the Ukrainian People's Republic
- Yevhen Petrushevych, President of the West Ukrainian National Republic
- Mykola Plaviuk, President of the Ukrainian People's Republic in exile (1989–1992)
- Petro Poroshenko, President of Ukraine (2014–2019)
- Vyacheslav Prokopovych, Prime Minister of the Ukrainian People's Republic (1920, 1921, 1926–1939)
- Lev Rebet, Acting Prime Minister of the Independent Ukrainian Republic (1941)
- Pavlo Shandruk, head of the Ukrainian National Committee in Weimar (1945)
- Pavlo Skoropadsky, Hetman of Ukraine or head of the Hetmanate (1918)
- Yaroslav Stetsko, Prime Minister of the Independent Ukrainian Republic (1941)
- Slava Stetsko, leader of the Ukrainian nationalist movement
- Kyryl Studynsky, head of the People's Assembly of Western Ukraine (1939)
- Borys Tarasyuk, Minister for Foreign Affairs (1998–2000 and 2005–2007)
- Serhiy Tihipko, Minister of Economics (2000)
- Yulia Tymoshenko, Prime Minister of Ukraine (2007–2010)
- Anatole Vakhnianyn, leader of the Christian Social Movement in Ukraine
- Avhustyn Voloshyn, President of Carpatho-Ukraine (1939)
- Volodymyr Vynnychenko, Prime Minister of the Ukrainian People's Republic, writer
- Stepan Vytvytskyi, President of the Ukrainian People's Republic in exile (1954–1965)
- Nikolaus (Mykola) Wassilko, Ritter von, member of the delegation in Brest-Litowsk, deputy with the rank of a minister at the ZUNR in Vienna (1918–1919), ambassador of Germany and Switzerland (1919–1924)
- Volodymyr Yaniv, member of the Ukrainian National Committee in Kraków (1941)
- Arseniy Yatsenyuk, Minister for Foreign Affairs (2007), Prime Minister of Ukraine (2014)
- Serhiy Yefremov, deputy head of the Central Rada (1917)
- Viktor Yushchenko, President of Ukraine (2005–2010)
- Viktor Yanukovych, Prime Minister of Ukraine (2002–2004, 2006–2007) and President of Ukraine (2010–2015)
- Volodymyr Zelenskyy, President of Ukraine (2019–present)

=== Zionists and Israeli politicians ===
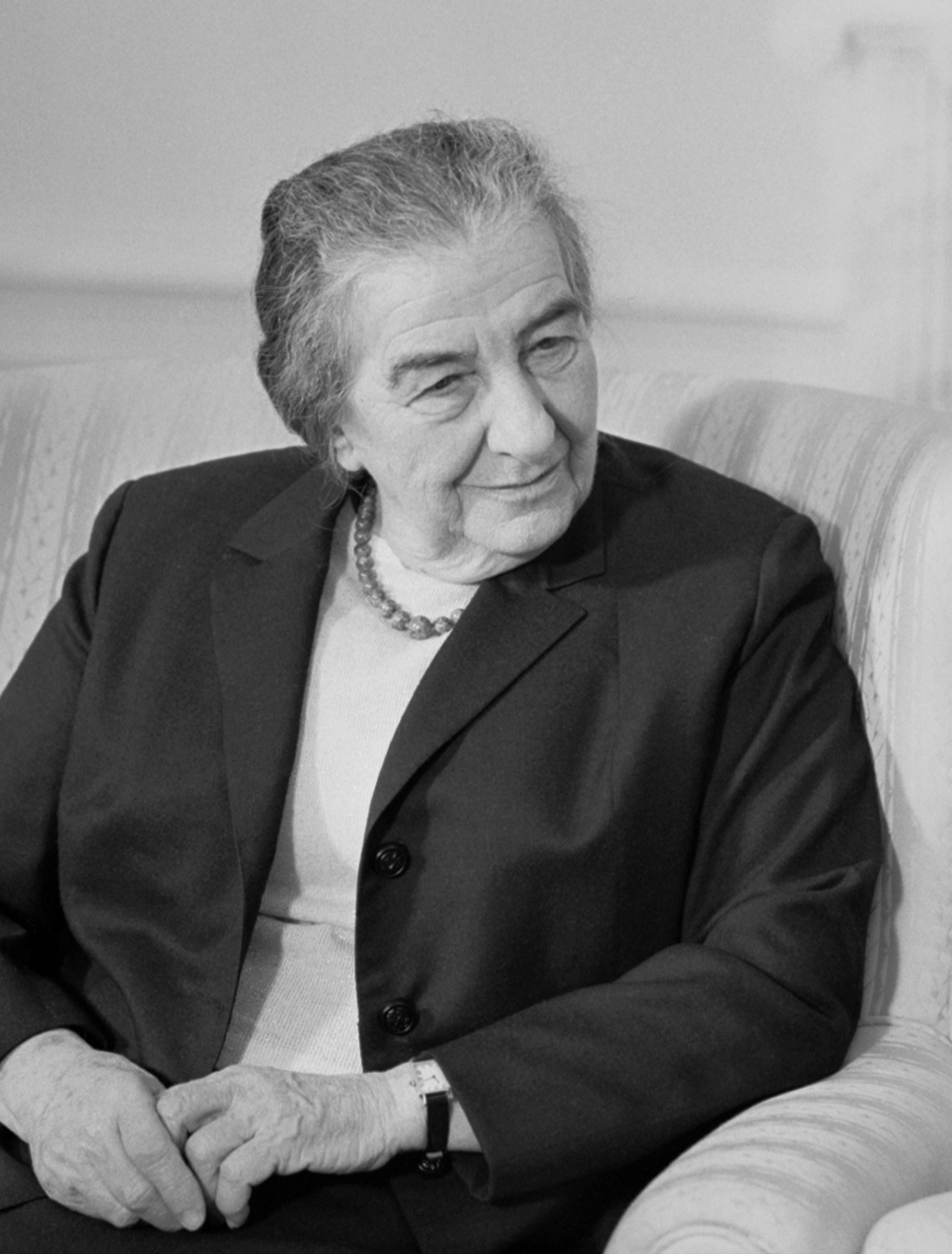
Golda Meir

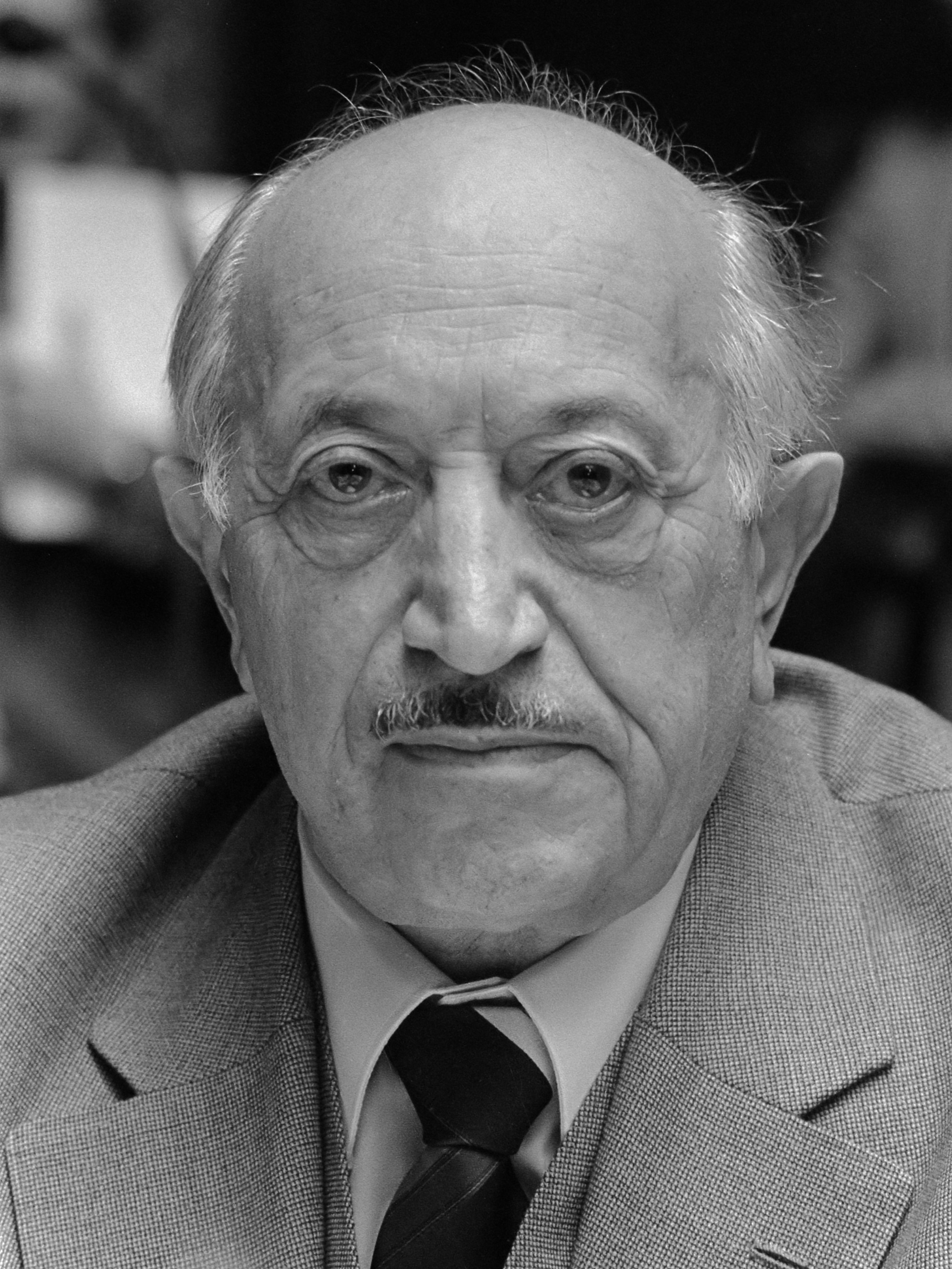
Simon Wiesenthal

- Chaim Arlosoroff, Zionist activist, leader of Mapai
- Daniel Auster, first Hebrew mayor of Jerusalem
- Yitzhak Ben-Zvi, historian, Labor Zionist leader, and President of Israel
- Ber Borochov, Zionist activist
- Levi Eshkol, Prime Minister of Israel
- Ahad Ha'am, Zionist activist
- Abba Hushi, mayor of Haifa
- Ze'ev Jabotinsky, Zionist leader, founder of Revisionist Zionism, writer and journalist in Hebrew and Russian language
- Ephraim Katzir, Israeli biophysicist, President of Israel
- Abraham Kaufman, leader of Jewish community in China
- Golda Meir, Prime Minister of Israel
- Leo Motzkin, Zionist activist
- Leon Pinsker, Zionist activist, leader of the Hovevei Zion
- Natan Sharansky, Soviet human rights activist and Israeli politician
- Moshe Sharett, Prime Minister of Israel
- Shevah Weiss, Israeli lawman and Labor Party politician, speaker of the Knesset
- Simon Wiesenthal, Nazi hunter
- Svitlana Zalishchuk, politician, public leader, journalist, and human rights LGBT campaigner and former member of Ukrainian Parliament

=== Bolsheviks and Soviet politicians ===
- Vladimir Antonov-Ovseyenko, Bolshevik leader and diplomat, one of the leaders of the October Revolution
- Yevgenia Bosch, Bolshevik politician, People's Secretary of Internal Affairs (1917–1918)
- Leonid Brezhnev, Soviet leader (1964–1982)
- Boris Shcherbina, Soviet politician who served as a vice-chairman of the Council of Ministers from 1984 to 1989. Supervisor of Soviet crisis management during 1986 Chernobyl disaster and the 1988 Armenian earthquake.
- Grigory Petrovsky, Old Bolshevik, participated in signing the Treaty on the Creation of the USSR, one of the officials responsible for implementing Stalin's policies such as collectivization.
- Hryhoriy Hrynko, finance minister of the Soviet Union (1930-1937)
- Vlas Chubar, finance minister of the Soviet Union (1937-1938)
- Yakov Malik, head of the Africa department of the Soviet Ministry of Foreign Affairs, Soviet ambassador to the United Kingdom,
- Vitold Fokin, Soviet politician, Central Planning Commission head, first prime minister of Ukraine after independence
- Yakov Gamarnik, Soviet politician
- Serafima Hopner, Bolshevik politician
- Semyon Ignatyev, Soviet politician
- Lazar Kaganovich, Soviet politician
- Yuriy Kotsiubynsky, Bolshevik politician
- Nikita Khrushchev, Soviet leader (1953–1964), transferred Crimea to Ukraine
- Anatoly Lunacharsky, first Soviet education minister, Latin alphabet advocate (similar to Atatürk), was sidelined by Stalin
- Solomon Lozovsky, Bolshevik politician
- Dmitry Manuilsky, Bolshevik politician
- Vitaliy Masol, Central Planning Commission head, third PM after the Independence
- Lev Mekhlis, Soviet politician
- Nikolai Podgorny, Chairman of the Presidium of the Supreme Soviet of the USSR (1965–1977), betrayed Khrushchev and later regretted
- Georgy Pyatakov, Bolshevik revolutionary, Trotskyist
- Karl Radek, Bolshevik politician
- Christian Rakovsky, Bolshevik politician
- Vladimir Semichastny, Soviet politician
- Petro Shelest, leader of the Communist Party of Ukraine (1963–1972), betrayed Khrushchev and later regretted
- Mykola Skrypnyk, Bolshevik leader
- Volodymyr Shcherbytsky, leader of the Communist Party of Ukraine (1972–1989), supported Gorbachev and later regretted
- Valentyna Shevchenko, the only female Chairperson of the Presidium of the Verkhovna Rada
- Viktor Taratuta, Bolshevik revolutionary
- Leon Trotsky, leading Bolshevik revolutionary, founder of the Red Army
- Moisei Uritsky, Bolshevik revolutionary
- Volodymyr Zatonsky, Bolshevik politician
- Grigory Zinoviev, Bolshevik revolutionary

=== Soviet dissidents ===
- Vyacheslav Chornovil
- Vasily Grossman
- Mykola Horbal
- Petro Hryhorenko
- Vitaliy Kalynychenko
- Ivan Kandyba
- Lev Kopelev
- Sergei Kovalev
- Yaroslav Lesiv
- Eduard Limonov
- Levko Lukyanenko
- Valeriy Marchenko
- Myroslav Marynovych
- Natan Sharansky
- Danylo Shumuk
- Vasyl Stus
- Nadiya Svitlychna
- Yosyf Zisels

=== Russian politicians ===
- Alexander Bezborodko, Grand Chancellor of Russian Empire
- Sergei Kiriyenko, prime minister of Russian Federation
- Dmitry Kozak, minister of regional development of Russia
- Valentina Matviyenko, governor of St Petersburg
- Yevgeny Primakov, prime minister of Russian Federation
- Alexey Razumovsky, count of Imperial Russia
- Sergei Storchak, deputy finance minister of Russia
- Yevgeny Yasin, minister of economy of Russian Federation
- Grigory Yavlinsky, liberal economist and leader of the Russian political party "Yabloko"

=== Polish politicians ===
- Henryk Józewski, deputy minister of the Ukrainian People's Republic (1920)
- Jan Karaszewicz-Tokarzewski, diplomat (1918–1924)
- Feliks Kon, Bolshevik politician
- Stanislav Kosior, Bolshevik politician
- Herman Lieberman, socialist politician
- Dmitry Manuilsky, Bolshevik politician
- Mieczysław Mickiewicz, minister of the Ukrainian People's Republic (1917–1918)
- Karl Radek, Bolshevik politician
- Adam Daniel Rotfeld, foreign minister of Poland (2005)
- Stanisław Stempowski, minister of the Ukrainian People's Republic (1920–1922)
- Andrey Vyshinsky, foreign minister of the Soviet Union (1949–1953)
- Wanda Wasilewska, communist politician

=== Austrian politicians ===
- Archduke Wilhelm of Austria, known as "Prince Vasyl"
- Franz Stadion, Count von Warthausen, Governor of Galicia (1847–1848)

=== Bulgarian politicians ===
- Christian Rakovsky, communist politician

=== Czechoslovak politicians ===
- František Kriegel, communist politician

=== German politicians ===
- Yevgenia Bosch, communist politician
- Emanuel Kwiring, communist politician

=== Italian politicians ===
- Angelica Balabanoff, communist politician

=== American politicians ===
- Kirill Reznik, Maryland State House of Delegates
- Herman Toll, former Pennsylvania Congressman
- Inna Vernikov, New York City councilwoman from Brooklyn

=== Chinese politicians ===
- Jakob Rosenfeld

=== Crimean Tatar politicians ===
- Noman Çelebicihan
- Ismail Gasprinski
- Mustafa Dzhemilev

== Religious leaders and theologians ==
=== Orthodox Christian ===
- Dymytriy (Yarema), Patriarch of the Ukrainian Autocephalous Orthodox Church (1993–2000)
- Hilarion of Kyiv, first native Rus metropolitan of Kyiv (c. 1051–c. 1054)
- John of Tobolsk, Orthodox metropolitan of Tobolsk (1711–1715)
- Mother Maria (Skobtsova), Eastern Orthodox nun, martyr
- Mefodiy (Kudryakov), metropolitan of the Ukrainian Autocephalous Orthodox Church (2000–present)
- Mstyslav (Stepan Skrypnyk), Patriarch of the Ukrainian Autocephalous Orthodox Church (1990–1993)
- Theophan Prokopovich, vice-president of the Orthodox Holy Synod
- Patriarch Volodomyr (Romaniuk), Patriarch of the Ukrainian Orthodox Church of the Kyivan Patriarchate.
- Dmytrij (Danylo Tuptalo) of Rostov, Orthodox saint
- Vasyl (Lypkivsky), first metropolitan of Ukrainian Autocephalous Orthodox Church (1921–1937)
- Stephen Yavorsky, first president of the Orthodox Holy Synod (1721)
- Paisius Velichkovsky, monk, spiritual writer, the founder of modern Eastern Orthodox staretsdom.

=== Greek Catholic ===
- Antin Angelovych, first Greek Catholic metropolitan of Lviv (1808–1814)
- Nykyta Budka, first Ukrainian Canadian Greek-Catholic bishop (1912–1927)
- Maxim Hermaniuk, Ukrainian Greek-Catholic Archbishop of Winnipeg (1956–1992)
- Josaphata Hordashevska, Greek Catholic nun (1869–1919)
- Ivan Hrynokh, Greek Catholic priest, professor at the Ukrainian Catholic University in Rome
- Lubomyr Husar, cardinal, head of the Ukrainian Greek Catholic Church (2001–2005), Major Archbishop of Kyiv and Halych (2005–2011)
- Nicholas Ilkov, chaplain, victim of the 1940 Katyn massacre (1890-1940)
- Gregory Khomyshyn, Greek Catholic bishop of Stanislav, martyr (1947)
- Josafat Kotsylovsky, Greek Catholic bishop of Peremyshl, martyr (1947)
- Omelyan Kovch, Greek Catholic priest of Peremyshliany, martyr (1944)
- Mykhailo Levitsky, cardinal (1856), Greek Catholic Archbishop of Lviv, Primate of Galicia and Lodomeria (1848–1858)
- Myroslav Ivan Lubachivsky, cardinal, head of the Ukrainian Greek Catholic Church (1984–2000)
- Roman Lysko, Greek Catholic priest, martyr (1949)
- Josyf Veliamyn Rutsky, Greek Catholic metropolitan of Kyiv (1613–1637)
- Yakym Senkivskyi, Greek Catholic priest, martyr (1941)
- Andriy Sheptytsky, head of the Ukrainian Greek Catholic Church, Metropolitan Archbishop of Lviv (1900–1944), political victim of the Soviet Union and was proclaimed as the enemy of the state.
- Klymentiy Sheptytsky, Greek Catholic Exarch of Russia and Siberia (1939), Archimandrite of the Studites (1944), martyr (1951), died in GULAG, victimized by Soviets for being Ukrainian
- Josyf Slipyj, head of the Ukrainian Greek Catholic Church (1944–1984), exited to Siberia and released in xxxx,
- Meletius Smotrytsky, Ruthenian religious activist and author (d. 1633)
- Stefan Soroka, Ukrainian Greek Catholic archbishop of Philadelphia (2000–2018)
- Vasyl Velychkovsky, Greek Catholic bishop (1963–1973)
- Innokentiy Vynnyckyj, first Greek Catholic bishop of Przemyśl (1691–1700)

=== Roman Catholic ===
- Andrzej Alojzy Ankwicz, Count, Archbishop of Lviv (1815–33), and Archbishop of Prague (1833–38)
- Eugeniusz Baziak, Archbishop of Lviv and Apostolic Administrator of Cracow (1944–1962)
- Józef Bilczewski, Archbishop of Lviv (1900–1923)
- Marian Jaworski, Cardinal, Archbishop of Lviv (1991–2008)
- Adam Stanisław Krasiński, Bishop of Kamianets-Podilskyi (1757–1798)
- Władysław Aleksander Łubieński, Archbishop of Lviv (1758–1759), Primate of Poland (1759–1767), and Interrex (1763–1764)
- Mieczysław Mokrzycki, Archbishop of Lviv (2008–present)
- Adam Naruszewicz, Titular Bishop of Smolensk (1775–1788), Suffragan Bishop of Lutsk (1788–1790) and Diocesan Bishop of Lutsk (1790–1796)
- Bogusław Radoszewski, Bishop of Kyiv (Latin rite, 1618–1633), Bishop of Lutsk (1633–1638)
- Kajetan Sołtyk, Bishop of Kyiv (1756–1759), then Bishop of Cracow (1759–1788)
- Józef Andrzej Załuski, Bishop of Kyiv (1759–1774)

=== Jewish ===
- Jacob Avigdor, last Chief Rabbi of Drohobych
- Moshe Reuven Azman, Chief Rabbi of Ukraine (2005–present)
- Yaakov Dov Bleich, Chief Rabbi of Ukraine and Kyiv (1992–present)
- Solomon Buber, Talmudic scholar
- Jacob Frank, Jewish religious reformer who combined Judaism and Christianity
- Zvi Hirsch Chajes, talmudic scholar
- Tzvi Hirsh of Zidichov, Hasidic rabbi
- Israel ben Eliezer, founder of Hasidism
- Malbim, rabbi and preacher
- Nachman of Breslov, Hasidic leader
- Solomon Judah Loeb Rapoport (Shir), rabbi of Ternopil (1837–40) and Prague (1840–67)
- Shalom Rokeach, first Rebbe of Belz (Hasidic dynasty) (1817–55)
- Yehoshua Rokeach, second rebbe of Belz (1857–1894)
- Yissachar Dov Rokeach, the third rebbe of Belz (1894–1926)
- Aharon Rokeach, fourth rebbe of Belz (1926–57)
- Mordechai Rokeach, rabbi, father of the fifth rebbe of Belz
- Sholom Mordechai Schwadron, rabbi
- Yoel Sirkis, great rabbi, one of Achronim
- Naftali Herz Tur-Sinai, Hebrew scholar
- Levi Yitzchok of Berditchev, Hasidic leader
- Israel Zolli, Chief Rabbi of Rome who converted to Roman Catholicism, born in Brody

=== Others ===
- Muhammad Asad, Jewish religious writer who converted to Islam, Pakistani diplomat
- Sima Babovich, Hakham of the Crimean Karaite
- Helena Blavatsky, founder of Theosophy
- Olga Dibrova, Ukrainian diplomat
- Abraham Firkovich, leader of the Crimean Karaites
- Seraya Shapshal, chief Hakham of the Crimean Karaite and Lithuanian Karaite communities
- Józef Teodorowicz, Archbishop of Lviv (Armenian rite, 1901–1938)

== Sport ==
=== Archery ===
- Tetyana Berezhna, archer
- Nataliya Burdeyna, archer
- Dmytro Hrachov, archer (Olympic bronze – team)
- Kateryna Palekha, archer
- Viktor Ruban, archer (Olympic champion)
- Oleksandr Serdyuk, archer (Olympic bronze – team)

=== Basketball ===
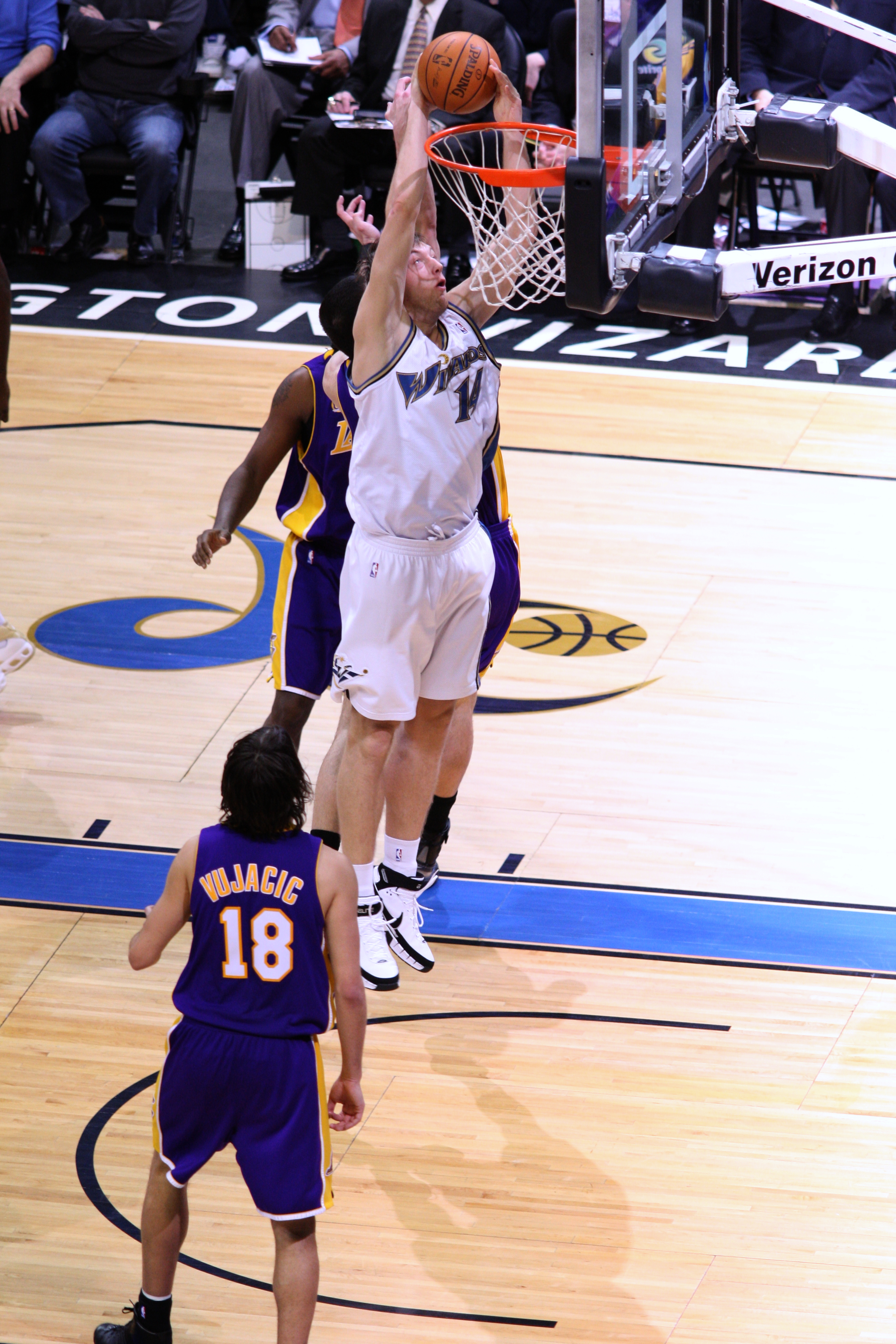
Oleksiy Pecherov

- Alexander Belostenny, Olympic medalist
- Viacheslav Kravtsov (born 1987), basketball player
- Oleksiy "Alex" Len, basketball player drafted 5th by the Phoenix Suns in 2013
- Stanislav Medvedenko, basketball player who won two NBA Finals championships in 2001 and 2002
- Sviatoslav Mykhailiuk (born 1997), college basketball player of the Kansas Jayhawks and NBA player
- Igor Nesterenko (born 1990), Israeli-Ukrainian basketball player in the Israel Basketball Premier League
- Oleksiy Pecherov, basketball player selected 18th by the Washington Wizards in 2006
- Vitaly Potapenko, basketball player drafted 12th by the Cleveland Cavaliers in 1996
- Jerome Randle, American-Ukrainian basketball club BC Žalgiris player
- Dmytro Skapintsev (born 1998), basketball player for Hapoel Jerusalem of the Israeli Basketball Premier League
- Alexander Volkov (born 1964), basketball player selected 134th by the Atlanta Hawks in 1986

=== Boxing ===
- Vasyl Lomachenko, boxer
- Oleksandr Usyk, boxer champion
- Taras Bidenko, boxer
- Louis Kaplan ("Kid Kaplan"), boxer, featherweight world champion
- Wladimir Klitschko, boxer champion
- Vitali Klitschko, boxer champion
- Yuriy Nuzhnenko, boxer champion
- Volodymyr Sydorenko, boxer champion
- Volodymyr Virchis, boxer

=== Chess ===
- Lev Alburt, Ukrainian Champion (1972, 1973, 1974)
- Izak Aloni, Lviv Champion (1936, 1939)
- Boris Alterman
- Lev Aptekar
- Vladimir Baklan, Ukrainian Champion (1997, 1998)
- Anatoly Bannik, Ukrainian Champion (1945, 1946, 1951, 1955, 1964)
- Alexander Beliavsky, Champion of the USSR (1987, and thrice jointly – 1974, 1980, 1990)
- Ossip Bernstein, All-Russian Sub-Champion (1903)
- Efim Bogoljubow, Champion of the USSR (1924, 1925), FIDE World Champion (1928/29), Challenger for World Championship (1929, 1934)
- Fedor Bohatirchuk, Champion of the USSR (1927 – jointly), Ukrainian Sub-Champion (1924) and Champion (1937), Canadian Sub-Champion (1949)
- Isaac Boleslavsky, Ukrainian Champion (1938, 1939, 1940)
- David Bronstein, Ukrainian Sub-Champion (1940), Champion of the USSR (1948, 1949 – both jointly), Challenger for World Championship (1951),
- Oscar Chajes
- Alexander Chernin, Champion of the USSR (1985 – jointly)
- Josif Dorfman, Champion of the USSR (1977 – jointly)
- Fyodor Duz-Khotimirsky, Kyiv Champion (1900, 1902, 1903, 1906)
- Louis Eisenberg
- Alexander Evensohn, Kyiv Champion (1914)
- Salo Flohr, winner of the 1957 Ukrainian Championship (off contest)
- Maurice Fox
- Henryk Friedman, seven-times Lviv Champion (1926–1934)
- Efim Geller, Ukrainian Champion (1950, 1957, 1958, 1959), Champion of the USSR (1955, 1979)
- Edward Gerstenfeld
- Vitali Golod, Ukrainian Champion (1991)
- Vladimir Grabinsky
- Eduard Gufeld
- Ilya Gurevich
- Mykhailo Gurevich, Ukrainian Champion (1984), Champion of the USSR (1985 – jointly)
- Alexander Huzman
- Vasyl Ivanchuk, Champion of Europe (2004)
- Stefan Izbinsky
- Nicolai Jasnogrodsky
- Abram Khavin, Champion of Western Ukraine (1940), Ukrainian Champion (1954)
- Artur Kogan
- Alexander Konstantinopolsky, Kyiv Champion five consecutive times (1932–1936)
- Irina Krush
- Gennady Kuzmin, Ukrainian Champion (1969, 1989, 1999 – all jointly), Sub-Champion of the USSR (1973)
- Kateryna Lahno
- Konstantin Lerner, Ukrainian Champion (1978, 1982)
- Naum Levin
- Paul List, Odesa Champion (1908)
- Marta Litinskaya-Shul, World Senior Women Chess Champion (2002)
- Isaac Lipnitsky, Ukrainian Champion (1949, 1956)
- Moishe Lowtzky
- Vladimir Malaniuk, Ukrainian Champion (1980, 1981, 1986)
- Adrian Mikhalchishin
- Anna Muzychuk
- Illia Nyzhnyk
- Alexander Onischuk
- Sam Palatnik
- Ruslan Ponomariov, FIDE World Champion (2002)
- Stepan Popel, Champion of Lviv (1930), Western Ukraine (1943 – jointly), Paris (1951, 1953, 1954) and eventually, of the Ukrainians in North America (USA and Canada)
- Ignatz von Popiel, Lviv Sub-Champion (1925)
- Vsevolod Rauzer, Ukrainian Champion (1927, 1933 – jointly)
- Oleg Romanishin, European Junior Champion (1973)
- Jakob Rosanes
- Nicolas Rossolimo
- Iosif Rudakovsky
- Ludmila Rudenko, Women's World Champion (1950–1953)
- Nikoly Rudnev
- Yuri Sakharov, Ukrainian Champion (1966, 1968)
- Vladimir Savon, Ukrainian Champion (1969 – jointly), Champion of the USSR (1971)
- Lidia Semenova
- Alexey Sokolsky, Ukrainian Champion (1947, 1948)
- Victor Soultanbeieff
- Leonid Stein, Ukrainian Champion (1960, 1962), Champion of the USSR (1963, 1965, 1966)
- Mark Taimanov, Champion of the USSR (1956)
- Vladimir Tukmakov, Ukrainian Champion (1970)
- Boris Verlinsky, Ukrainian Champion (1926), Champion of the USSR (1929)
- Yakov Vilner, Ukrainian Champion (1924, 1925, 1928)
- Daniel Yanofsky
- Abram Zamikhovsky, Ukrainian Champion (1931)
- Anna Zatonskih

=== Fencing ===
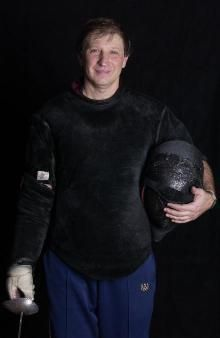
Yury Gelman

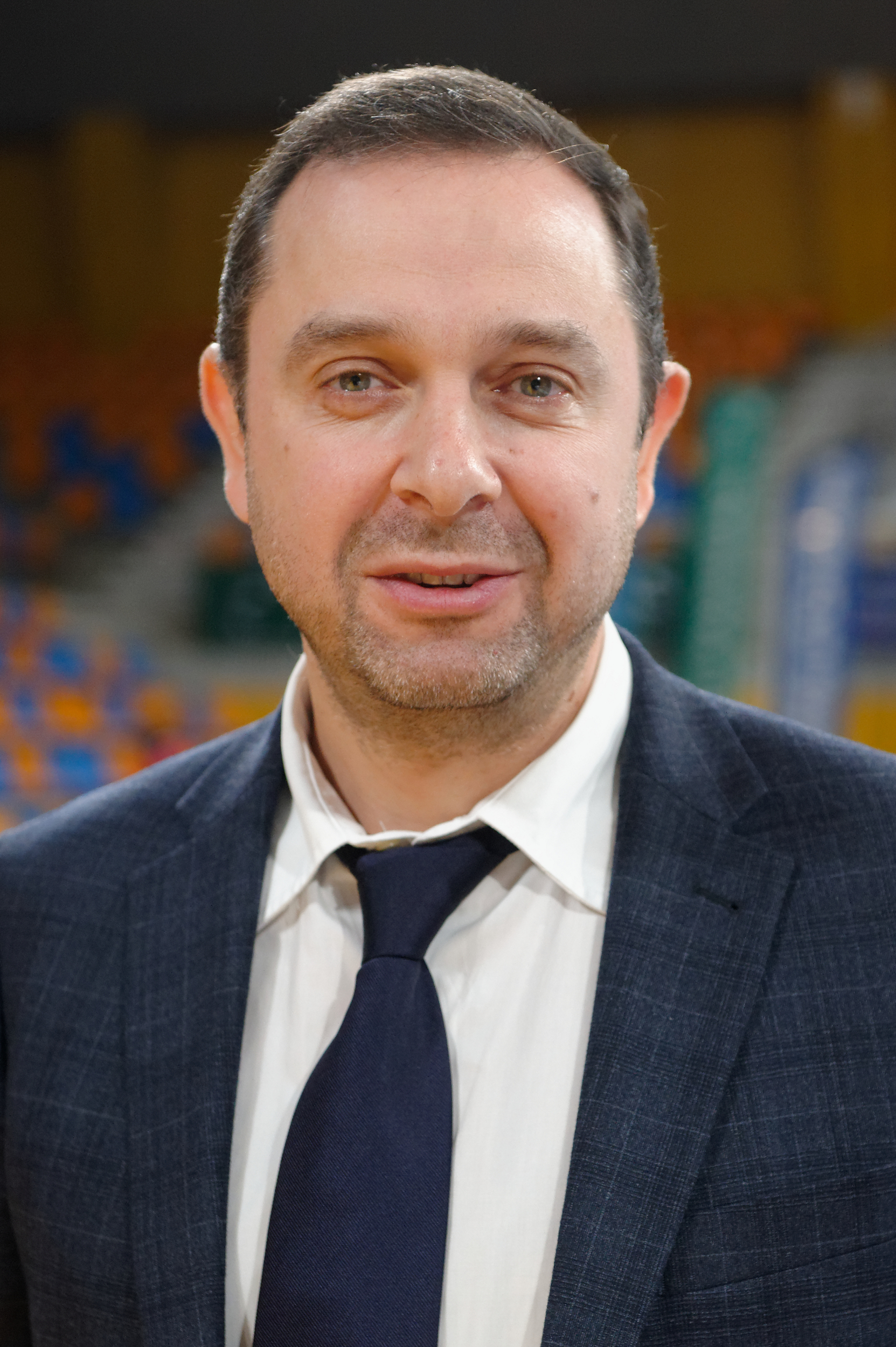
Vadym Gutzeit

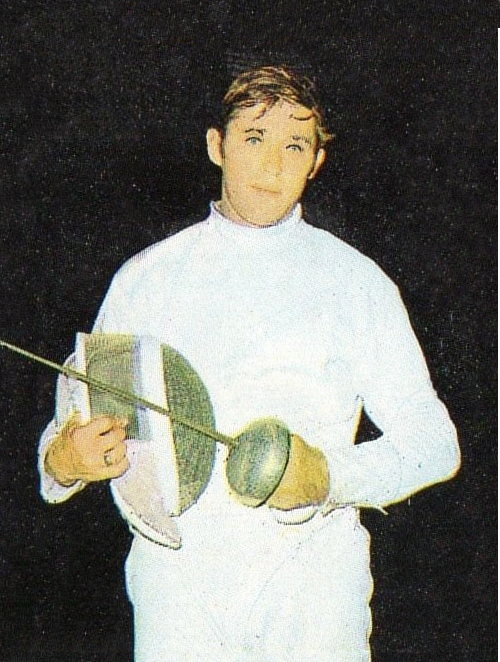
Grigory Kriss

- Yury Gelman (born 1955), Ukrainian-born American Olympic fencing coach
- Vadim Gutzeit, saber fencer, Olympic champion, Ukraine's Youth and Sport Minister.
- Serhiy Kravchuk, épée fencer, Olympic bronze
- Grigory Kriss, épée fencer, Olympic champion, 2-time silver
- Olena Kryvytska (born 1987), 3-time world bronze
- David Tyshler, saber fencer, Olympic bronze
- Yulen Uralov, foil fencer, Olympian
- Iosif Vitebskiy, épée fencer, Olympic silver, 10-time national champion, world champion
- Olga Zhovnir, saber fencer

=== Figure skating ===
- Oksana Baiul, figure skater (Olympic gold)
- Oleksii Bychenko (born 1988), Ukrainian-born Israeli figure skater, Olympian
- Alexei Beletski, Israeli ice dancer, Olympian
- Natalia Gudina, Israeli figure skater, Olympian
- Kyrylo Marsak, Olympic figure skater
- Viktor Petrenko, figure skater (Olympic gold, World Championship gold)
- Aliona Savchenko, German figure skater
- Michael Shmerkin, Israeli figure skater
- Adel Tankova (born 2000), Ukrainian-born Israeli Olympic figure skater

=== Football (soccer) ===
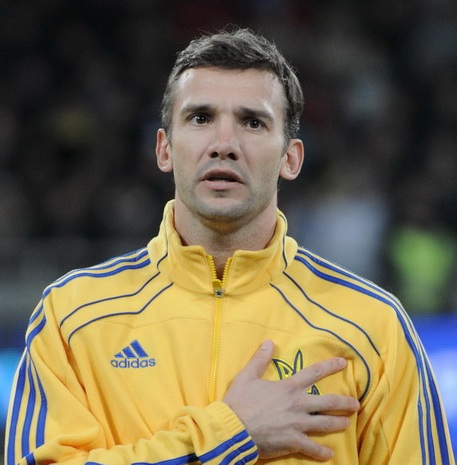
Andriy Shevchenko

- Oleksandr Aliev, footballer
- Igor Belanov, footballer, Ballon d'Or (1986)
- Oleg Blokhin, footballer, Ballon d'Or (1975)
- Leonid Buryak, footballer, midfielder, Olympic bronze, coach
- Walter Chyzowych, footballer, football coach
- Ivan Getsko, footballer
- Oleksandr Horshkov, footballer
- Timerlan Huseinov, footballer
- Oleg Iachtchouk, footballer
- Maryana Ivanishyn, footballer
- Yuri Kalitvintsev, footballer
- Serhiy Kandaurov, footballer
- Vitaliy Kosovsky, footballer
- Dema Kovalenko, footballer
- Leo Krupnik (born 1979), American-Israeli footballer, football coach
- Viktor Leonenko, footballer
- Yevgeny Levchenko, footballer
- Valeriy Lobanovs'kyi, football coach
- Yevhen Lutsenko, footballer
- Oleh Luzhnyi, footballer
- Dov Markus (born 1946), American-Israeli footballer, born in Ukraine
- Yuri Maximov, footballer
- Artem Milevskyi, footballer
- Volodymyr Mykytyn, footballer
- Serhiy Nazarenko, footballer
- Andriy Oberemko, footballer, midfielder (Illichivets & U21 national team)
- Dmytro Parfenov, footballer
- Yevhen Pokhlebayev, footballer
- Andriy Polunin, footballer
- Serhiy Popov, footballer
- Serhii Rebrov, footballer
- Serhiy Serebrennikov, footballer
- Serhiy Scherbakov, footballer
- Andriy Shevchenko, footballer, Ballon d'Or (2004)
- Oleksandr Shovkovskyi, footballer
- Serhiy Skachenko, footballer
- Viktor Skrypnyk, footballer
- Oleh Suslov, footballer
- Oleksandr Holovko, footballer
- Andriy Husin, footballer
- Maksym Kalynychenko, footballer
- Ruslan Rotan, footballer
- Oleg Salenko, footballer
- Hryhoriy Surkis, president of the Football Federation of Ukraine till 2012
- Anatoliy Tymoschuk, footballer
- Vladyslav Vashchuk, footballer
- Andriy Voronin, footballer
- Andriy Yarmolenko, footballer
- Artem Yashkin, footballer
- Serhiy Zeldi, footballer
- Oleksandr Zinchenko, footballer
- Roman Yaremchuk, footballer, striker

=== Gymnastics ===
- Anna Bessonova, gymnast
- Iryna Deriugina, gymnast
- Artem Dolgopyat (born 1997), Israeli artistic gymnast (second in world championships)
- Maria Gorokhovskaya, gymnast (2 Olympic golds; all-around individual exercises, team combined exercises), 5-time silver (vault, asymmetrical bars, balance beam, floor exercises, team exercises with portable apparatus)
- Tatyana Gutsu, gymnast (Olympic gold)
- Yuri Nikitin, gymnast
- Lilia Podkopayeva, gymnast (Olympic gold)
- Larisa Latynina, gymnast (9 Olympic golds)
- Karina Lykhvar, Israeli Olympic rhythmic gymnast
- Tatiana Lysenko, gymnast, 2-time Olympic champion (balance beam, team combined exercises), bronze (horse vault)
- Kateryna Serebrians'ka, gymnast (Olympic gold)
- Oxana Skaldina, gymnast (Olympic bronze)
- Olexandra Tymoshenko, gymnast (Olympic gold)
- Olena Vitrychenko, Individual Rhythmic Gymnast (Olympic bronze)
- Natalia Zhadanova, rhythmic gymnast
- Roman Zozulya, gymnast

=== Ice hockey ===
- Ruslan Fedotenko, ice hockey player
- Dmitri Khristich, ice hockey player
- Orest Kindrachuk, ice hockey player
- Eric Nesterenko, ice hockey player
- Mikhail Nemirovsky (born 1974), Canadian-German ice hockey player
- Alexei Ponikarovsky, hockey player
- Ivan Pravilov (1963–2012), ice hockey coach, arrested for sexual abuse of teenage student, committed suicide by hanging in prison
- Denis Shvidki, ice hockey player
- Kostiantyn Simchuk, ice hockey player
- Vicky Sunohara, ice hockey player
- Vitaly Vishnevsky, ice hockey player
- Nikolai Zherdev, ice hockey player
- Alexei Zhitnik, ice hockey player

=== Swimming ===
- Yana Klochkova, swimmer (4 Olympic golds)
- Lenny Krayzelburg, swimmer (now U.S. citizen); 4-time Olympic champion (100 m backstroke, 200-m backstroke, twice 4x100-m medley relay); 3-time world champion (100 m and 200-m backstroke, 4×100-m medley) and 2-time silver (4×100-m medley, 50-m backstroke); 3 world records (50-, 100-, and 200-m backstroke)
- Maryna Piddubna, Paralympic swimmer
- Maxim Podoprigora, Olympic swimmer

=== Tennis ===
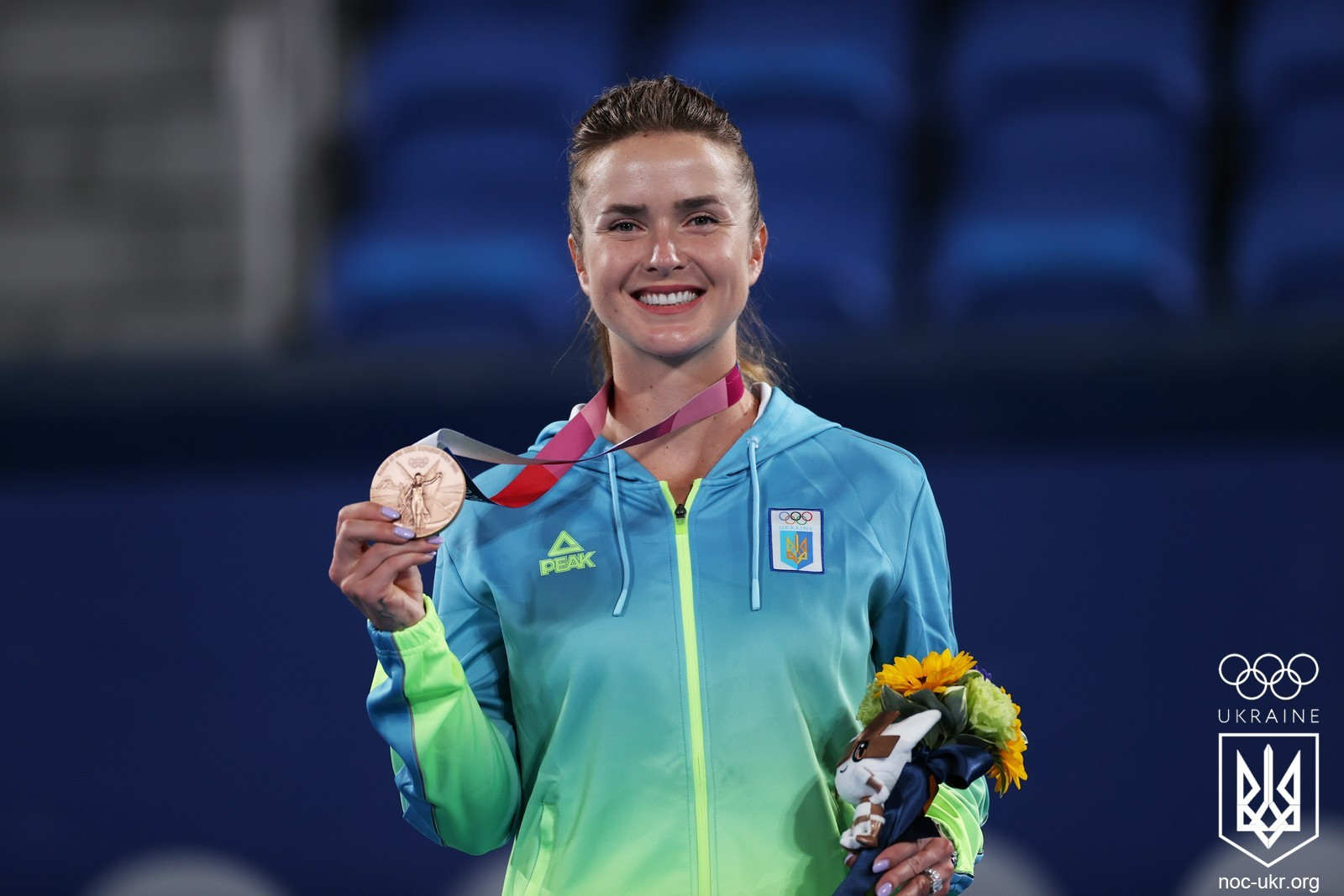
Elina Svitolina won Ukraine's first Olympic tennis medal

- Yulia Beygelzimer, tennis player
- Alona Bondarenko, tennis player
- Kateryna Bondarenko, tennis player
- Gail Brodsky (born 1991), American tennis player
- Olga Fridman (born 1998), Ukrainian-Israeli tennis player
- Julia Glushko (born 1990), Ukrainian-born Israeli tennis player
- Anhelina Kalinina, tennis player
- Mariya Koryttseva, tennis player
- Marta Kostyuk, tennis player
- Viktoriya Kutuzova, tennis player
- Andriy Medvedev, tennis player
- Tatiana Perebiynis, tennis player
- Elina Svitolina, tennis player (won Ukraine's first Olympic tennis medal, in 2020)
- Olga Savchuk, tennis player
- Yuliia Starodubtseva, tennis player
- Julia Vakulenko, tennis player
- Dayana Yastremska, tennis player
- Maryna Zanevska, tennis player

=== Track and field ===
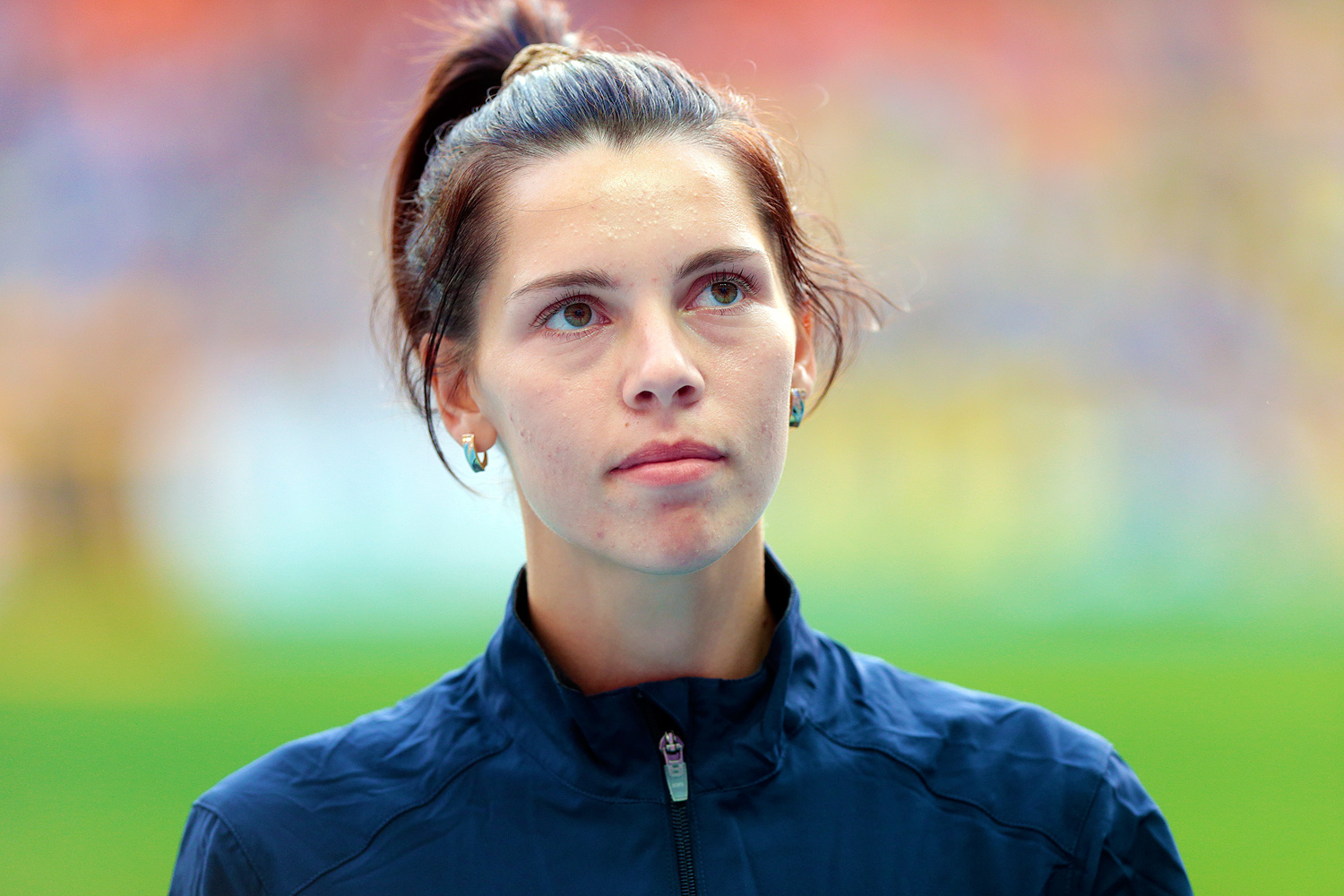
Hanna Knyazyeva-Minenko

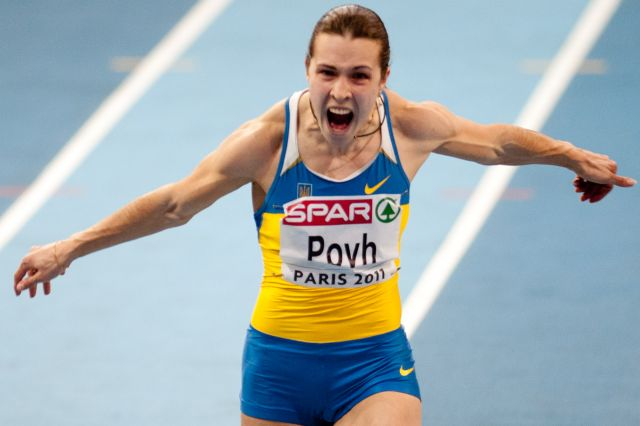
Olesya Povh

- Aleksandr Bagach, shot putter
- Valeriy Borzov, sprinter (2 Olympic golds)
- Serhiy Bubka, pole vault legend (Olympic gold), numerous world records
- Vasiliy Bubka, also a pole vaulter, older brother of Sergey/Serhiy
- Hanna Knyazyeva-Minenko (born 1989), Israeli triple jumper and long jumper
- Inessa Kravets, jumper (world record in triple jump)
- Volodymyr Kuts, long-distance runner (2 Olympic golds)
- Serhiy Lebid, long-distance runner (8-time winner of European Cross Country championships)
- Faina Melnik, discus thrower (Olympic gold)
- Zhanna Pintusevych-Blok, sprinter (World Championship gold); world 100-m & 200-m champion
- Olesya Povh, sprinter (Olympic bronze, world bronze)
- Tamara & Irina Press, sister athletes (5 Olympic golds in total)
- Viktoriya Styopina, high jumper
- Viktor Tsybulenko, javelin (Olympic gold, Olympic bronze)

=== Weightlifting ===
- Grigory Novak, Olympic silver (middle-heavyweight); world champion
- Sergii Putsov, sports coach and athlete
- Igor Rybak, Olympic champion (lightweight)
- Timur Taymazov, world and Olympic records
- Eduard Weitz, Israeli Olympic weightlifter

=== Wrestling ===
- Alexander Davidovich, Israeli Olympic wrestler
- Vasyl Fedoryshyn, Olympic silver (freestyle 60 kg); world championship silver & bronze
- Grigory Gamarnik, world champion (Greco-Roman lightweight)
- Samuel Gerson, Olympic silver (freestyle featherweight)
- Boris Michail Gurevich (1937–2020), Olympic champion (freestyle middleweight)
- Oleg Ladik (born 1971), Ukrainian-born Canadian Olympic wrestler
- Yakov Punkin, Olympic champion (Greco-Roman featherweight)
- Nik Zagranitchni, Israeli Olympic wrestler

=== Other athletes ===
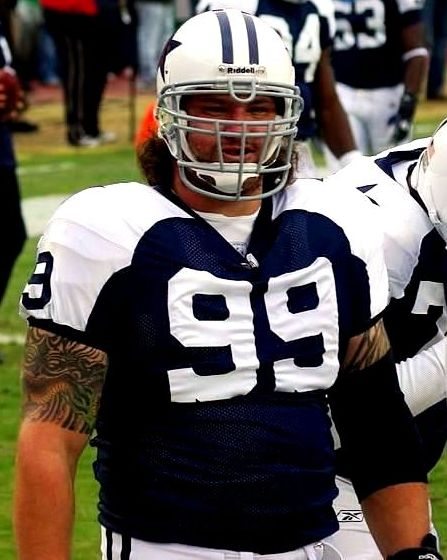
Igor Olshansky

- Vladislav Bykanov (born 1989), Ukrainian-born Israeli Olympic short track speed skater
- Valentina Chepiga (born 1962), IFBB professional bodybuilder
- Olga Danilov (born 1973), Israeli Olympic speed skater
- Fedor Emelianenko, mixed martial arts fighter
- Charles Goldenberg (1911–1986), American All-Pro National Football League player
- Leonid Kolumbet, Olympic cycling medalist
- Marina Kravchenko (born 1975), Soviet and Israel national table tennis teams
- Artur Kyshenko, K-1 kickboxing champion
- Yevhen Lapinsky, Olympic champion volleyball player
- Valentin Mankin (1938–2014), sailor (3 Olympic golds); only sailor in Olympic history to win gold medals in three different classes (yachting: finn class, tempest class, and star class), silver (yachting, tempest class)
- Igor Olshansky (born 1982), American football player, DL (Miami Dolphins)
- Olyeg Olyeksandrovich Prudius aka Vladimir Kozlov, pro wrestler
- Peter Paltchik (born 1992), Ukrainian-born Israeli Olympic and European champion judoka
- Sergy Richter (born 1989), Israeli Olympic sport shooter
- Ian Rubin (born 1973), Russia national rugby league team
- Vasyl Virastyuk, world's strongest man competition (1st place 2004)
- Igor Vovchanchyn, mixed martial arts fighter
- Yaroslav Vynokur, billiards player (world champion)

== Oligarchs ==
- Ihor Kolomoyskyi, Ukrainian businessman of Jewish descent
- Gennadiy Korban, Ukrainian businessman of Jewish descent, collector of modern and contemporary art
- Olena Pinchuk, daughter of Ukrainian second president Leonid Kuchma
- Viktor Pinchuk, Jewish-Ukrainian businessman
- Eduard Prutnik, Ukrainian businessman and politician
- Rinat Akhmetov, Ukrainian businessman and oligarch
- Dmytro Firtash, Ukrainian businessman and investor

== Other ==
- Roxelana (Hurrem Sultan), Legal Wife of Suleiman the Magnificent and the Haseki sultan of the Ottoman Empire
- Volodymyr Butkevych, judge
- Markiyan Dimidov, concentration camp survivor
- Oksana Epel, judge
- Georgiy Gongadze, journalist, civil activist
- Stefan Kiszko, man wrongly convicted of murder in England
- Joseph Oleskiw, early promoter of immigration to Canada
- Anatoly Onoprienko, serial killer
- Leonid Stadnik, unofficially the world's tallest man
- Taras Kulakov (born 1987), born to a Russian mother and Ukrainian father. He is now a citizen of the US. He rose to internet fame as a YouTube personality known for life hack and gadget reviewing videos.
- Vladlen Tatarsky (pseudonym of Maxim Fomin), convicted criminal and war propagandist
- Volodymyr Zolkin, YouTuber and activist

== See also ==
- List of presidents of Ukraine
- List of Ukrainian Jews
- List of Galician Jews
- List of Ukrainian Americans
- List of Ukrainian Canadians
- Galicia (Eastern Europe)
- List of people from Galicia (modern period)
- List of people by nationality
- Seven Wonders of Ukraine
