= Russian in Ukraine =

Russian in Ukraine may refer to:

- Russian language in Ukraine
- Russians in Ukraine

== See also ==
- Famous Ukrainians of Russian ethnicity
- Demographics of Ukraine
- Anti-Russian sentiment in Ukraine
- Ukrainians in Russia
- Ukrainization
- Polish minority in Ukraine
