= Zabara =

Zabara may refer to:

- Emilian Zabara, a Romanian sprint canoer
- Joseph Zabara, a Spanish-Jewish physicist, poet and satirist
- Natan Ilyich Zabara, a Ukrainian writer of Yiddish literature
- Olesya Zabara, a Russian triple jumper
- Zabara (horse), a British racehorse
- Zabara, Ukraine, a village in Zhytomyr Oblast, Ukraine
