= Vasyl Hnylosirov =

Ukrainian educator

- Василь Гнилосиров
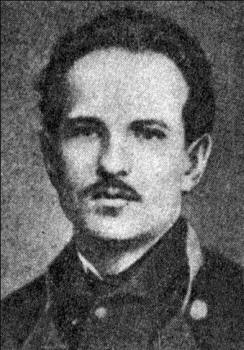
- Born: Vasyl Stepanovych Hnylosirov; 22 March 1836; Havryshivka, Russian Empire (now Havryshivka, Ukraine)
- Died: 22 October 1900 (aged 64); Kaniv, Russian Empire (now Kaniv, Ukraine)
- Other names: A. Gavrysh (Russian); O. Havrish (Ukrainian)
- Education: VN Karazin Kharkiv National University
- Occupations: writer, publicist, educator, teacher

Vasyl Stepanovych Hnylosirov (Ukrainian: Василь Степанович Гнилосиров; 22 March 1836 – 22 October 1900), was a Ukrainian educator and writer, who wrote works in Ukrainian and Russian in the Russian Empire.

== See also ==
- List of people from Ukraine
