= Efim Jourist =

Soviet and German composer

- Born: Yukhym Yukhymovych Yuryst; January 13, 1947; Kamianets-Podilskyi, Ukrainian SSR, Soviet Union (present-day Ukraine)
- Died: January 13, 2007 (aged 60); Hamburg, Germany
- Occupations: Composer, accordionist, bajan player

Efim Jourist (January 13, 1947 – January 13, 2007, born Yukhym Yukhymovych Yuryst) (Note: Ukrainian: Юхим Юхимович Юрист, romanized: Yukhym Yukhymovych Yuryst) was a Soviet and German composer, accordionist and bajan player.

== Life ==
Efim Jourist was born in Kamianets-Podilskyi, Ukrainian SSR, Soviet Union, graduated from the Kamianets-Podilskyi City Children's Music School in 1961, and studied at the Khmelnytskyi Music School, now known as the Khmelnytskyi Music College named after Vladyslav Zaremba, from 1962–1966. From 1966 until 1971 he studied at the conservatory of Gorky where he made the acquaintance of the composer Nikolai Chaykin. This connection had a great influence on his musical development. After his graduation he became a soloist with the Krasnoyarsk Philharmonic orchestra and he started on an international career. Jourist came to Germany with his family in 1992, where he continued giving recitals. Jourist also founded the quartet Efim Jourist Quartett which consists of bajan, violin, guitar and double bass. With his quartet he has played on many international festivals, like the Rheingau Musik Festival in Germany. The quartet can be extended to the Efim Jourist Ensemble which consists of marimba/vibraphone and percussion in addition. During his life Jourist has arranged many compositions of mainly soviet composers for his ensembles and he has composed himself for bajan and orchestra. Efim Jourist died from cancer on his 60th birthday in Hamburg, Germany.

== Major works ==
=== Orchestra ===
- Carmen-Fantasie (1998)

arrangement of Georges Bizet, for bajan and orchestra

- Hommage à Astor Piazola (1996)

for orchestra

- Hummelflug (Schwarzäugige Hummel) (1995, "Flight of the Bumblebee")

arrangement of Nikolai Rimsky-Korsakov, for bajan und orchestra

- La Russie (1995)

tango-rhapsody for bajan & orchestra

- Pavane

for strings

- Vier Jahreszeiten (2006)

arrangement of Astor Piazzolla, for bajan & chamber orchestra

=== Quartet ===
- Bilder aus dem alten Russland (1995, "Pictures from Old Russia")
- Ich danke dir, mein Herz (1995, "I thank you, my heart")
- Russische Rhapsodie (1995, "Russian Rhapsody")
- La Russie (1995)

tango-concerto

- Ein weiter Weg (2000, "A long Way")

arrangement of Boris Fomin

- Tango Pizzicato (2001)
- Rondo Capriccioso (2003)

arrangement of Felix Mendelssohn-Bartholdy's Rondo für Klavier op. 33

=== Chamber music ===
- Korobejniki (1980)

Russian tune, for bajan

- Moldavia Chora (1983)

Russian tune, for bajan

- Süße Beere (1985, "Sweet Berry")

Russian tune, for bajan

- Schwarze Augen (1985, "Black Eyes")

Russian tune, für bajan

- Polowetzer Tänze (1998, "Polovtsian Dances")

arrangement from Alexander Borodin's opera "Fürst Igor", for bajan

- Toccata (2002)

for flute, bass clarinet, drums, bajan, piano, cello & double bass

- Erinnerung an Buenos Aires (2002, "Memories of Buenos Aires")

for bass clarinet, drums, piano, cello & double bass

- Am Grab von A. Piazolla (2002, "At A. Piazolla's Grave")

for bajan, guitar, piano, violine & double bass

- Vier Jahreszeiten (2006, "Four Seasons")

arrangement of Astor Piazzolla, trio for piano

- Russische Taverne (Dialog zweier Trinker), "Russian Taverna (Dialogue of two Drunkards)"

for violine & piano

=== Vocal ===
- Sechs Lieder nach Gedichten von Heinrich Heine (2002, "Six Songs from Heinrich Heine's Poems")

for singing voice, piano/bajan, violine, guitar & double bass
