= Markiyan Dimidov =

Ukrainian concentration camp survivor

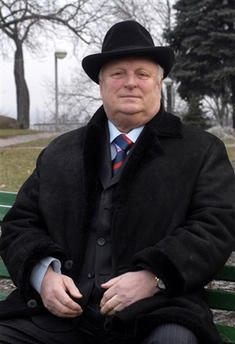
Markiyan Dimidov.

Markiyan Dimidov (born 1935) is a Ukrainian concentration camp survivor who was only eight back in 1943 when the Nazis set fire to his 3-year-old sister, Feofania, in a shed somewhere in a Belarusian forest, along with his grandmother, great-grandmother and his 2-year old cousin. Six decades later, Dimidov gained a small measure of compensation for that suffering, €7,670 (US$10,000), from the German Forced Labour Compensation Programme.
