= Maryana Ivanishyn =

Ukrainian footballer

Personal information
- Date of birth: 24 August 1992 (age 34)
- Position: Defender

International career^{‡}
Years	Team	Apps	(Gls)
- Ukraine
- ‡ National team caps and goals as of 19:24, 30 August 2019 (UTC)

Maryana Ivanishyn (born 24 August 1992) is a Ukrainian footballer who plays as a defender and has appeared for the Ukraine women's national team.

== Career ==
Ivanishyn has been capped for the Ukraine national team, appearing for the team during the 2019 FIFA Women's World Cup qualifying cycle.
