= George Shakhnevich =

Ukrainian-American musician

- Георгій Шахневич
- Born: January 11, 1954 (age 72); Kiev, Ukrainian SSR, Soviet Union (now Kyiv, Ukraine)
- Occupations: Accordionist, songwriter, composer

George Oleksandrovych Shakhnevich (Note: Ukrainian: Георгій Олександрович Шахневич, romanized: Heorhii Oleksandrovych Shakhnevych) (born January 11, 1954) is a Ukrainian-American accordionist, songwriter, composer, musician and former television personality.

== Early life ==
Shakhnevich was born in Kiev, Ukraine and began playing the accordion at age six. As a teenager, he began playing professionally in regional areas around Kiev. At age eighteen, Shakhnevich was drafted into the Soviet military, in which he served for the next two years. Soon after, he graduated from the Pedagogical Institute of Kirivograd in Ukraine.

== Gaining recognition ==
While serving as a radio jockey in local radio stations around Kiev, Shakhnevich became the host and musical personality of a children’s television show, lead primarily by a group of teenage performers called Altana. His frequent television appearances made him a local celebrity around Kiev, and soon before his departure to the United States, Shakhnevich appeared with Altana on the popular Soviet television show Morning Star, performing the Beatles song "Yesterday" live before a nationwide audience.

== Move to the United States ==
Shakhnevich, like so many Jewish Eastern Europeans, immigrated to the United States with his family in 1992. He moved into the Coney Island section of Brooklyn, New York, after his arrival. In 1993, Shakhnevich was hired to work as a musical therapist at the Menorah Home & Hospital in the Sheepshead Bay area of Brooklyn. His debut album, Accordion Rendezvous was released in 2005. Shakhnevich also participated in the 2005 Vivian Vivio Stolaruk Memorial International Entertainment Competition for Accordionists, held in Dearborn, Michigan.

== Personal life ==
He has been married to wife Jane since 1979. They have two children, Steven (born 1980) and Dmitriy (born 1988).

== Albums ==
- Accordion Rendezous (2005)
