= Sergii Putsov =

Ukrainian sports coach (born 1982)

- Born: 1982 (age 43–44); Ukraine
- Education: International Olympic Academy; National University of Physical Education and Sports of Ukraine
- Occupations: Sports coach Athlete

Sergii Putsov (born 1982) is a Ukrainian sports coach and athlete. He is the head coach at the Discipline Club and the head of Sport Science at Torokhtiy weightlifting team.

As an athlete, Putsov represented the national team in the 94 kg weight class and won multiple medals in national competitions.

== Early life and education ==
Putsov completed his master's and PhD degree specializing in Olympic and professional sport training at the National University of Physical Education and Sports of Ukraine. His dissertation was entitled "Building the training process of highly qualified weightlifters in the annual macrocycle". He is also certified in strength sports coaching and physical education instruction. He also completed post graduated course at the International Olympic Academy in Greece.

== Career ==
From 2004 to 2011, Sergii served under a contract in the Armed Forces of Ukraine, competed as a weightlifter for the Central Sports Club of the Army and trained under the leadership of Honored Coach of the USSR Yukhim Eisenstadt. After the military service, he started his coach career and worked with multiple notable athletes, including Oleksiy Torokhtiy and Oleksandr Usyk.

From 2015 to 2019, Putsov and Sergii Konuyshok co-founded and organized the Lviv Fitness Weekend, a prominent fitness convention in Ukraine.

In 2019, Putsov collaborated with Oleksiy Torokhtiy to develop the Matrix system for training which simplified the understanding of complex movements.

In 2020, Putsov worked as a commentator for the Rio Olympics, focusing on weightlifting.

In 2022, Putsov appeared in an episode of HBO's documentary series "Real Sports with Bryant Gumbel."

Currently, Putsov is the fitness director of the Discipline Club, and the senior coach of the Warm Body Cold Mind team and Torokhtiy weightlifting team.

== Selected publications ==
- Spatiotemporal characteristics in the structure of jerk motion at female weightlifters according to anthropometric indexes.Antonyuk O.V.; Putsov S.O.; Kononets B.V.
- Biodynamics of the Technique of Barbell Jerk in Weightlifters of Different Sexes Oleshko V. G., Korobeynikov G. V., Shynkaruk O. A., Putsov S. O.
- Fundamentals of construction of training process female athletes in weightlifting different bunches of weight classes. Oleshko V.G.; Putsov S.O.
- Alexei Butovsky. At the sources of the Olympic Movement. Putsov S. O.
- Competitive activity of weightlifters at the xxxii olympic games 2020 in tokyo: results and prospect. Yang, Tаngxun; Oleshko V.G.; Torokhtiy O.P.; Putsov S. O.
