= Oksana Epel =

Oksana Volodymyrivna Epel
- Оксана Володимирівна Епель
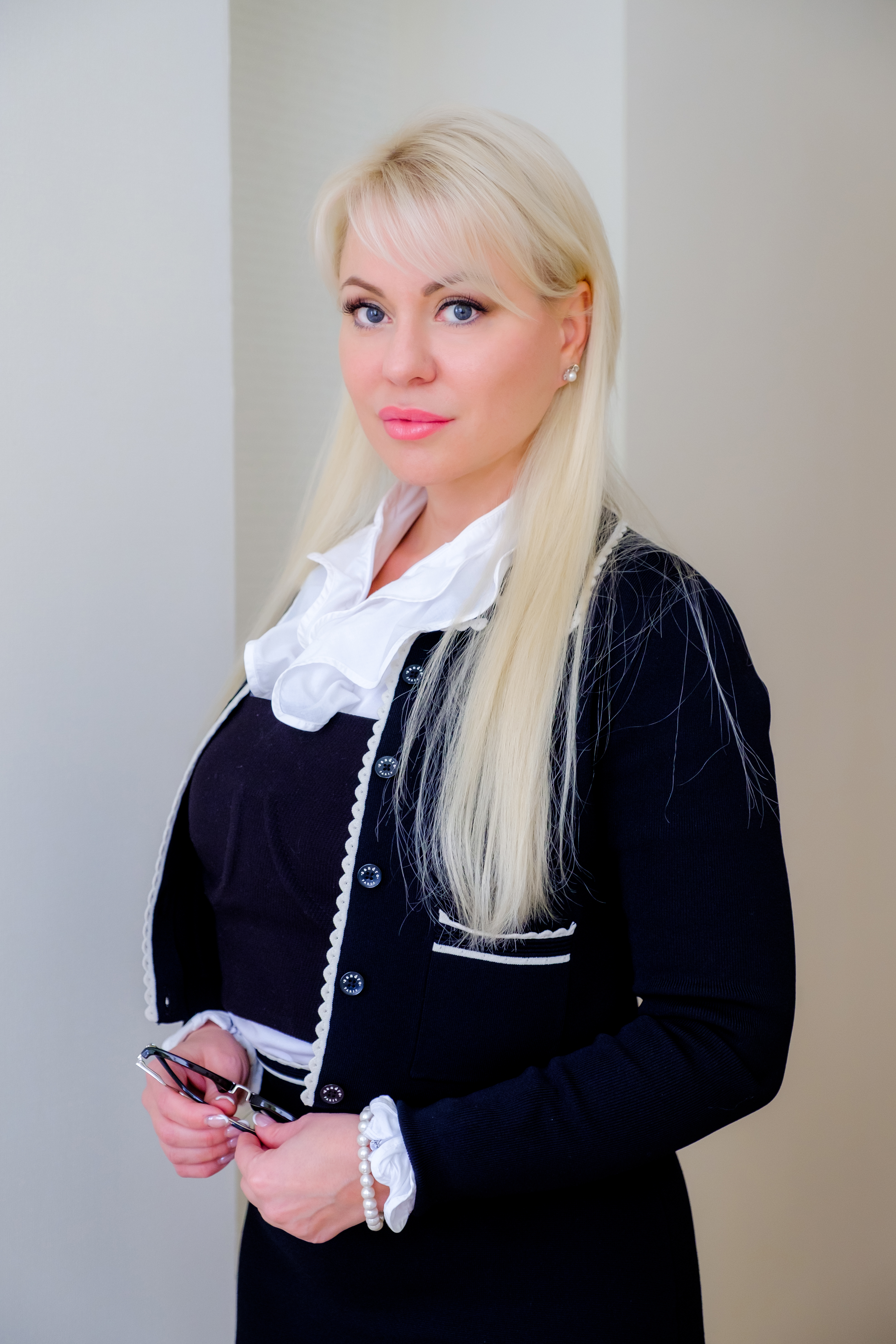

Judge of the Sixth Administrative Court of Appeal
- Incumbent
- Assumed office September 2018

Personal details
- Born: 13 February 1972 (age 54) Donetsk, Ukrainian SSR, USSR
- Education: Donetsk National University

Oksana Volodymyrivna Epel (Ukrainian: Оксана Володимирівна Епель) (born 13 February 1972) is a Ukrainian judge who sits on the Sixth Administrative Court of Appeal. She is a graduate of Donetsk National University.

== See also ==
- Women in law
