= Mykhailo Zharzhailo =

- Жаржайло Михайло
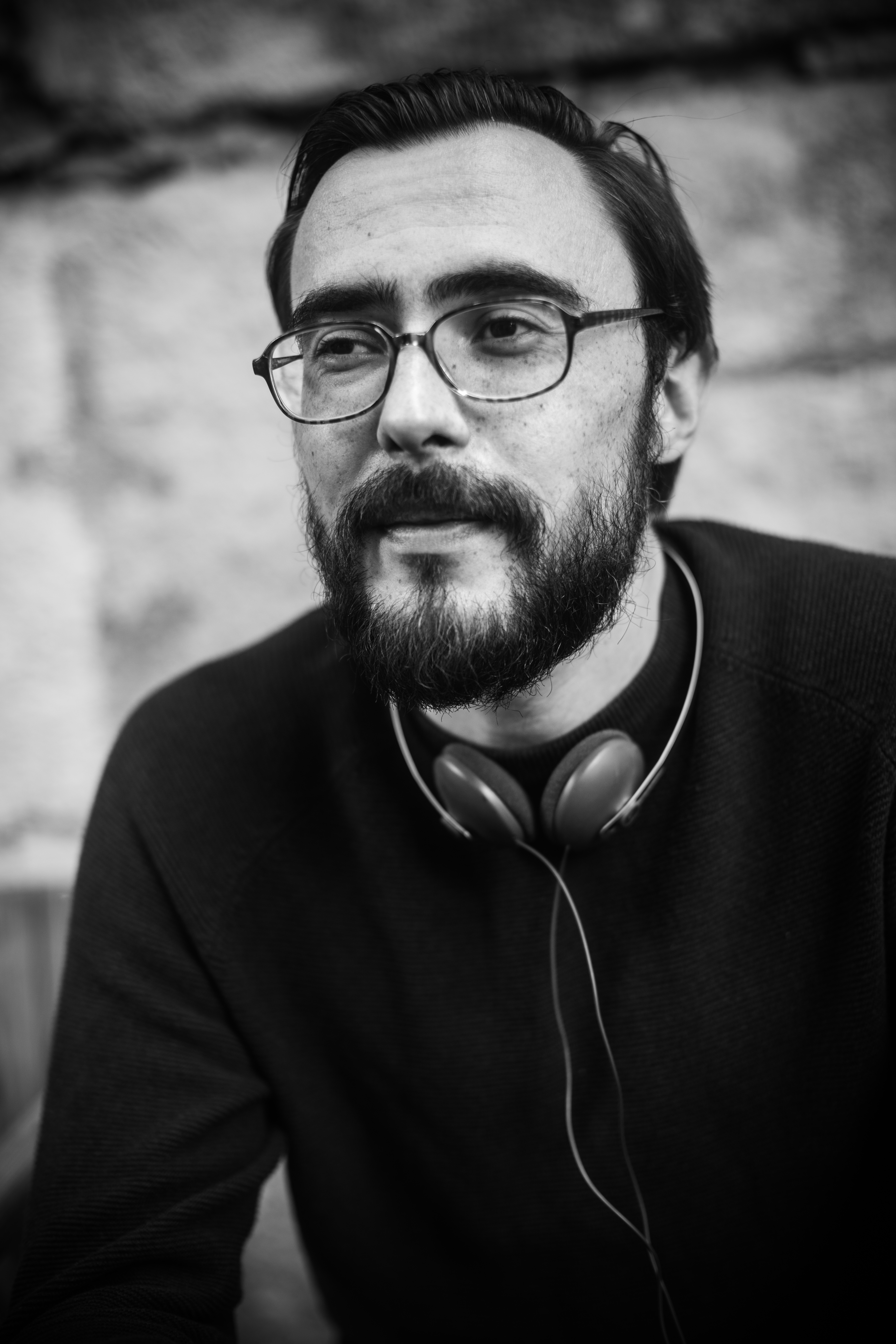
- Born: April 7, 1988 (age 38); Rivne
- Occupation: Poet
- Awards: Smoloskyp

Mykhailo Zharchailo (born April 7, 1988, in Rivne) is a Ukrainian poet, performer, and organizer of art events.

== Biography ==
Zharchailo was born in Rivne on April 7, 1988.

He started writing science fiction novels and poetry when he was in high school. He began writing regularly, mainly free verse, at the age of 17–18, after moving from Rivne to Kyiv for his studies.

In 2011, he received prize in the poetry category for the collection of poems "Photographing Dreams," and in 2012, he received prize for the collection "Police of Karma" in literary competition of the "Smoloskyp" publishing house.

His collection "Police of Karma" was published in 2014, and book presentations were held in Rivne, Ivano-Frankivsk, Lutsk, Vinnytsia, Chernivtsi, Kyiv, and Lviv.

His second poetry collection, "Unacceptable Symbols," was published by the Kharkiv-based publishing house kntxt in 2020.

In 2015 Zharchailo's poems were adapted into a mini-play "The River of the Dead General" performed by the Lviv theater "Sklad 2.0".

In 2016 he co-founded media-poetic group AETHER: mediacollaboration in real time. This creative union includes writer and translator Iryna Zahladko, musician Yuriy Bulkha, and artist Roman Haydeychuk. From 2016 to 2019, the group conducted eleven multimedia poetic performances in Lviv, Chernivtsi, Ivano-Frankivsk, combining poetry, video, and music created by the group members.

From 2016 to 2018, he co-organized events "Cultivation of graphomania" (2016), "Petripoetry" (2017), "BIOS" (2018).

He was a co-translator of Dmitry Kuzmin's book "Kovdry ne peredbacheni" in 2018.

Since 2018 Zharchailo work on the project "Blackout Constitution", which won the Power of Young competition from Publicis Groupe in the category of "Conceptual Communication".

In 2020, he participated in the online residency AIRO by Coldbench and a group exhibition dedicated to the solidarity of artists in the fight against the COVID-19 pandemic. For several years, has been a member of the jury of the International Poetry Competition "Haivoronia".

Zharchailo's works are printed in several poetry anthologies, as well as in the magazines "SHO," "Odnoklassnik," "Vozdukh," "Maladosc," on online portals Litcentr, Soloneba, Radar, Salon Literacki, Helikopter, in Ukrainian and foreign online periodicals.

Participated in many literary events and festivals such as Publishers' Forum, Meridian Czernowitz, Bandershtat, ZAHID, Young Republic of Poets, SUP, Tripil'ske Kolo, Gogolfest, Gogolivka, Johanssenfest, De Libertate, Kyiivs'ki Lavry, Artgnosis, Zaporizhzhia Book Toloka, Kyiv poetry week, online festival Not Here, Translatorium, March Cats, Bouquet Kyiv Stage, Contemporary Ukrainian Poetry Festival and others.

Individual poems have been translated into Polish, German, English, Spanish, Russian, Belarusian, and Hebrew.

He currently lives and works in Lviv and Kyiv.
