= Oleh Kozerod =

Ukrainian political scientist and history researcher

Oleh Kozerod (born 1970) (Ukrainian: Оле́г Віталійович Козеро́д) is a political scientist and history researcher. He came from a German-Polish aristocratic family Kosyrod de Pyser coat of arms.

== Biography ==
Kozerod was born in Ukraine, and has become a political scientist and history researcher. For many years he worked as a European reporter for several news agencies, including the World Jewish News Agency. Kozerod graduated from Kharkiv University in 1993, M.A. (Hist), Dnipropetrovsk University in 1996, Ph.D. and Donetsk University in 2009, D.Litt. He is Fellow at the Institute of Political and Ethno-national Studies of the National Academy of Sciences of Ukraine.

== Academic activities ==
Kozerod is an expert in the history of Ukraine, in the field of contemporary policy and national security of Great Britain and the European Union, including the history of the 20th century, terrorism, xenophobia, anti-Semitism and interethnic relations. In 1996, he defended a Ph.D thesis on historiography of the White Movement in Ukraine.

He is a member of numerous public and professional international organizations, including the European Association for Jewish Studies, Royal Historical Society and Oxford University Alumni Society.

Since 2002 – publisher and editor-in-chief of the Russian newspaper Achievements. Since 2001, he is a visiting Fellow and Scholar at the Oxford Center for Hebrew and Jewish Studies, and Academic Visitor at the European Humanities Research Center (University of Oxford). Since 2003 - Fellow of Kuras Institute of Political and Ethno-national Studies of the Academy of Sciences of Ukraine. Since 2011 – Research Fellow and Vice President of Centre for European Democracy Studies (CEDS). Since 2026 - Professor political history of Paris University for International Education.

== Publications ==
Kozerod is an author of scientific and op-ed articles, and several monographs, including:

- "Perelomnye gody. Evreiskaya obshina Ukrainu v 1919-1929 gg." [Life-Changing Years. Jewish Community in Ukraine 1919-1929], Kharkiv, 1998 - 161 pp
- "A.I.Denikin's regime and Jewish Population of Ukraine: 1919-1920", Kharkiv, 1997
- "Evrei Ukrainy v period novoi ekonomicheskoi politiki" [Ukrainian Jews during the New Economic Policy], Kyiv, 2002 - 252 pp
- 150 evreiskyh organizazyi Velikobritanii. [150 Jewish Organizations of Great Britain], Kyiv, 2006 -181 pp.
- Genderni Aspekty Istorii Ukrains’kogo Evreistva na prukladi periodu 1920-kh rokiv (Gender Aspects of the History of Ukrainian Jewry, the Case of the 1920s). Kyiv: Raduga, 2013.- 104 pp.
- Istoriografichni Problemy evreiskoi istorii i filosofii (Historiographical problems of Jewish history and philosophy). Kyiv: Raduga, 2014.- 190 pp.
- Jewish national community in the context of the integration of Ukrainian society. Kyiv, 2014.- 376 p., coauthored.
- Rozvytok i vzaemodiya evreiskih gromad na evropeiskomu prostori (Kyiv, 2017. 464 pp.-coauthored).
- Suchasni evreiski gromady Evropy (Modern Jewish community of Europe). Kyiv, 2019. - 252 pp.;
- Evrei Ukrainy v 1921-1929 (Jews of Ukraine in 1921-1929).Warsaw, 2019.- 328 pp.;
- Jewish Woman in Ukraine: Writers, Zionists, Leaders in the 1920s, Warsaw, 2019- 103 pp.
- Pogromy v Ukraine u 1919-1921 rr. ta ikh naslidki (Pogroms in Ukraine in 1919-1921 and their consequences). Warsaw, 2020. - 128 pp.
- Suchasna evreiska gromada Velikoi Britanii (Modern Jewish community of Great Britain). Warsaw, 2022. - 139 pp.
- Modern EU Policy on Development and Protection of Jewish Communities. Declarations and realities. Warsaw, 2023. - 107 pp.
- Political and historical aspects of the development of Jewish communities in Ukraine and diaspora countries in the context of modern challenges. Kyiv, 2024., coauthored.
- Modern European policy on protection and fostering Jewish life. Kyiv, 2025.,
- Die moderne EU-Politik zur Entwicklung und zum Schutzjüdischer Gemeinschaften: Ekrlärungen. Antwerpen, 2025.-225 pp.
