= Serhiy Zeldi =

Ukrainian footballer

Personal information
- Full name: Serhiy Volodymyrovych Zeldi
- Date of birth: 13 June 1986 (age 40)
- Place of birth: Kiev, Soviet Union
- Height: 1.82 m (6 ft 0 in)
- Position: Midfielder

Senior career*
Years	Team	Apps	(Gls)
2002–2006	FC Dynamo-3 Kyiv	51	(9)
2004–2005	FC Dynamo-2 Kyiv	4	(0)
2005	→ FC CSKA Kyiv (loan)	17	(1)
2006–2007	FC Helios Kharkiv	25	(6)
2007	FC Zakarpattia Uzhhorod	1	(0)
2008	FC Helios Kharkiv	20	(0)
2009	FC CSKA Kyiv	10	(0)
2009	FSC Prykarpattya Ivano-Frankivsk	14	(0)
2010	SC Tavriya Simferopol	3	(0)
2010	FSC Prykarpattya Ivano-Frankivsk	3	(0)
2011	FC Bukovyna Chernivtsi	0	(0)
2011–2013	MFC Mykolaiv	40	(0)

International career
2003	Ukraine (U17)	5	(0)
2006–2007	Ukraine (U21)	9	(0)
- * Club domestic league appearances and goals

Serhiy Volodymyrovych Zeldi (Ukrainian: Сергій Володимирович Зелді; born 13 June 1986) is a Ukrainian former footballer.
