= Oleksander Horilyj =

Oleksander Horilyj (Ukrainian: Олександр Горілий), (14.09.1863, Chernigov Governorate - after 1937) was a Ukrainian conductor. Graduated from Moscow conservatoire and medical institute. In 1918 he became the first conductor of the Ukrainian National Symphony Orchestra . Subjected to repression in 1937.
