= Yuriy Kovbasenko =

Ukrainian philologist and teacher (born 1958)

Yuriy Ivanovich Kovbasenko
- Юрій Іванович Ковбасенко
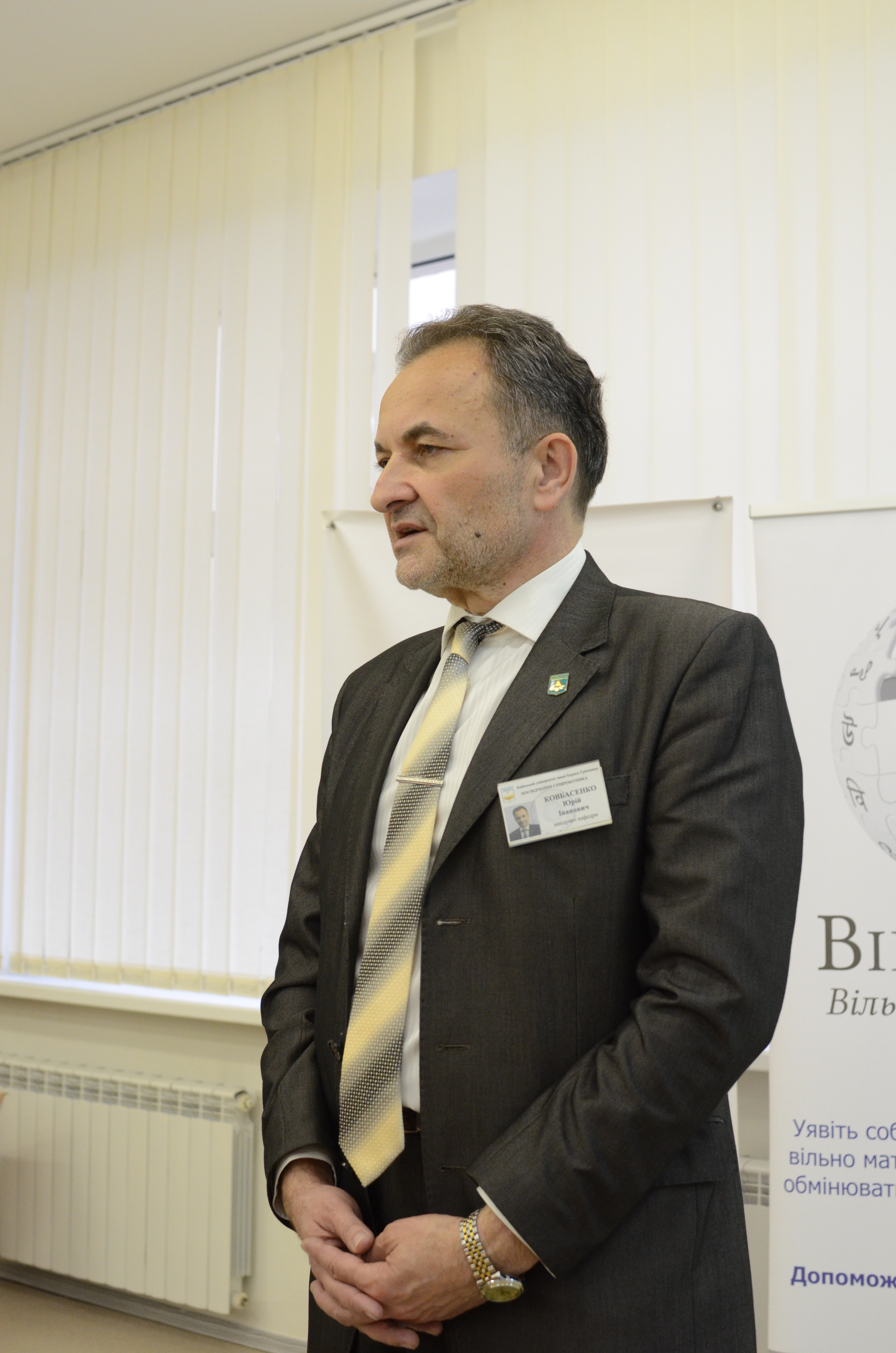
- Kovbasenko in 2016
- Born: 26 October 1958 (age 67); Horodyshche, Cherkasy Oblast, Ukrainian SSR, Soviet Union
- Occupations: Philologist, teacher
- Known for: Author of over 200 scientific works on philology and literary education

Yuriy Ivanovich Kovbasenko (born 26 October 1958, Horodyshche, Cherkasy Oblast) is a Ukrainian philologist and teacher.

== Career ==
He is author of over 200 scientific works on philology and literary education, including monographs, tutorials for middle and high school, approved by the Ministry of Education and Science of Ukraine.

In 2022, Kovbasenko served on a panel that determined works by Russian and Soviet authors would be removed from the foreign literature school curriculum.
