= Natan Ilyich Zabara =

Ukrainian writer

- Born: 1908; Rogachev, Zhytomyr area, Ukraine
- Died: 1975 (aged 66–67); Kiev, Ukraine (?)
- Occupation: Jewish writer
- Known for: time in a Siberian gulag
- Notable work: wrote in Yiddish

Natan Ilyich Zabara (1908–1975) was a Jewish writer born in Rogachev, a shtetl located in the Zhytomyr area of Ukraine. He wrote in Yiddish and was a member of the Union of Ukrainian Writers (Soyuz Ukrainiski Pisatelei).

In his youth, Zabara lived in Kharkiv and was an active member of the youth Zionist Movement. It was in this part of his life that he began to write and to be published. During World War II he was a special correspondent for the newspaper Krasnaya Zvezda (Red Star). After the defeat of Nazi Germany, he remained in Berlin and worked for the Russian newspaper Tägliche Rundschau.

He was arrested, along with many other Jews, during Stalin's last weeks of life, and spent four to five years in a Siberian gulag). When he was released, he moved to Kiev.
