= Rafal Kiernicki =

Servant of God, Bishop Rafal Kiernicki, OFMConv
- Titular Bishop of Dura, Auxiliary Bishop of Roman Catholic Archdiocese of Lviv
- Church: Roman Catholic Church
- Appointed: 16 January 1991
- Term ended: 23 November 1995
- Other post: Dean of the Cathedral Basilica of the Assumption, Lviv (1949–1958, 1965–1991)

Orders
- Ordination: 29 June 1939 (Priest) by Bolesław Twardowski
- Consecration: 2 March 1991 (Bishop) by Marian Jaworski

Personal details
- Born: Władysław Kiernicki; 3 May 1912 Kulachkivtsi, Austrian-Hungarian Empire (present day Ivano-Frankivsk Oblast, Ukraine)
- Died: 23 November 1995 (aged 83) Lviv, Ukraine

Rafal Wladyslaw Kiernicki, O.F.M. Conv. (Ukrainian: Рафал Владислав Керницький; Polish: Rafał Władysław Kiernicki; 3 May 1912 – 23 November 1995) was a Roman Catholic prelate from Ukraine as the Titular Bishop of Dura and Auxiliary bishop of Archdiocese of Lviv since 16 January 1991 until his death on 23 November 1995.

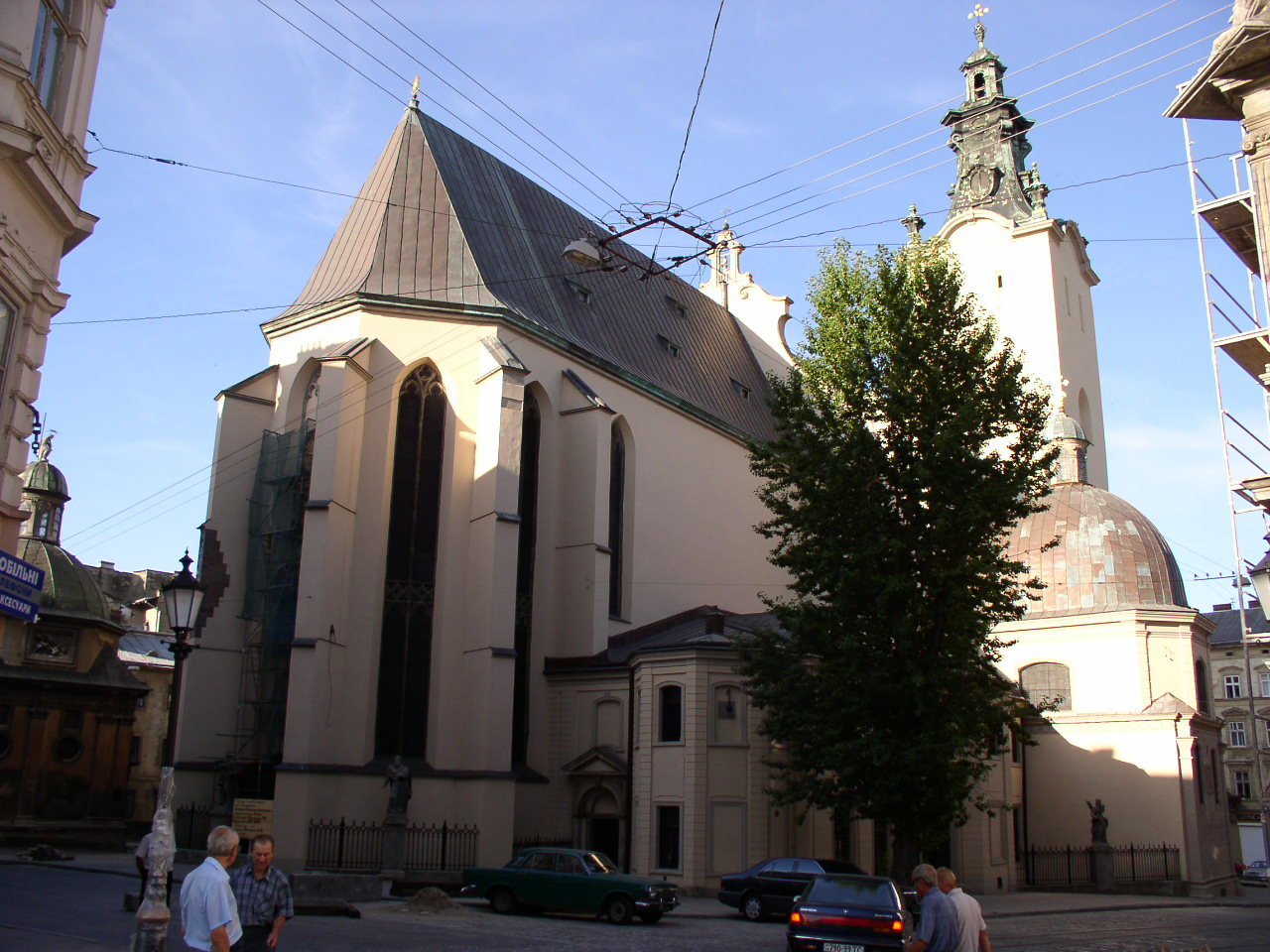
Cathedral Basilica of the Assumption, Lviv, where Bishop Rafal Kiernicki is buried in the crypt

== Life ==
Kiernicki was born in the peasant Roman Catholic family of Antoni and Michalina (née Światłowska) Kiernicki in a present day of the territory of Kolomyia Raion of Ivano-Frankivsk Oblast, Ukraine. After graduation of the primary school in his native village (1920–1924) and the neighbouring village Hvozdets (1924–1927), he continued to study in a Franciscan gymnasium in Lviv (1927–1934). While studied in gymnasium, he joined the Order of Friars Minor Conventual in 1930; made a profession on September 4, 1931 and a solemn profession on October 4, 1934. Kiernicki subsequently made a philosophical and theological studies at the Franciscan Theological Seminaries in Lviv, Kraków and at the Faculty of Theology of the University of Lviv and the Major Roman Catholic Theological Seminary in Lviv and was ordained as priest on June 29, 1939 by Archbishop Bolesław Twardowski.

During first Soviet and Nazi occupations of the Western Ukraine he served as a parish priest and professor in the Theological Seminary. In the same time he was the clandestine member and chaplain of the Home Army. Was arrested by the NKVD in 1941, but avoided the death, because of the prison Brygidki's escape. In 1944 he was again arrested by NKVD and imprisoned until 1948, when was released and continued to serve as a parish priest and during a period of the Polish population transfers (1944–1946) he remained in the Soviet Union. Rest of his life he spent as a Dean of the Cathedral Basilica of the Assumption, Lviv (1949–1958, 1965–1991). Here he worked until 1991 under the Communist persecution of the Religion.

On January 16, 1991, he was appointed by the Pope John Paul II as an Auxiliary Bishop of the Archdiocese of Lviv and a Titular Bishop of Dura. On March 2, 1991, he was consecrated as bishop by Metropolitan Archbishop Marian Jaworski and other prelates of the Roman Catholic Church in the Cathedral Basilica of the Assumption, Lviv.

Kiernicki died in office in Lviv on November 23, 1995 in the age 83.

Kiernicki's canonisation process was opened on May 4, 2012 in the century of his birth date in the Cathedral Basilica in Lviv and he became a Servant of God.

Catholic Church titles
Preceded by Knut Ansgar Nelson	Titular Bishop of Dura; 1991–1995	Succeeded by Aloysius Paul D'Souza
