= Józef Bilczewski =

Polish Roman Catholic prelate

Saint Józef Bilczewski
- Archbishop of Lviv
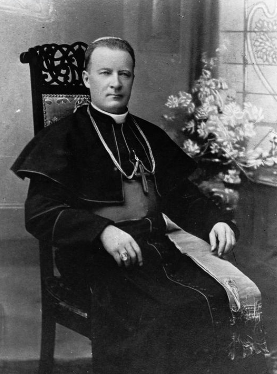
- Church: Roman Catholic Church
- Archdiocese: Lviv
- See: Lviv
- Appointed: 17 December 1900
- Installed: 1901
- Term ended: 20 March 1923
- Predecessor: Seweryn Morawski
- Successor: Bolesław Twardowski

Orders
- Ordination: 6 July 1884 by Albin Dunajewski
- Consecration: 20 January 1901 by Jan Maurycy Paweł Puzyna z Kosielsko
- Rank: Archbishop

Personal details
- Born: Józef Biba; 26 April 1860 Wilamowice, Austrian Empire (now Poland)
- Died: 20 March 1923 (aged 62) Lwów, Second Polish Republic (now Ukraine)
- Denomination: Roman Catholic
- Education: University of Vienna; Jagiellonian University; Pontifical Gregorian University

Sainthood
- Feast day: 20 March
- Venerated in: Roman Catholic Church
- Beatified: 26 June 2001; Lviv Hippodrome, Ukraine by Pope John Paul II
- Canonized: 23 October 2005; Saint Peter's Square, Vatican City by Pope Benedict XVI
- Attributes: Episcopal attire
- Patronage: Archdiocese of Lviv; Teachers; Wilamowice; Beggars; Homeless people
- Relatives: Biba, Pietrzak, Makuch and Lukaszka (main Family)

Ordination history of Józef Bilczewski
History
Priestly ordination
- Ordained by: Albin Dunajewski
- Date: 6 July 1884
Episcopal consecration
- Principal consecrator: Jan Maurycy Paweł Puzyna z Kosielsko
- Co-consecrators: Andrij Aleksander Sheptytsky & Józef Sebastian Pelczar
- Date: 20 January 1901
- Place: Lviv Cathedral, Lviv, Austria-Hungary (now Ukraine)
Episcopal succession
Bishops consecrated by Józef Bilczewski as principal consecrator
- Władysław Bandurski: 30 December 1906
- Bolesław Twardowski: 12 January 1919

Józef Bilczewski (26 April 1860 – 20 March 1923) was a Polish Roman Catholic prelate who served as the Archbishop of Lviv from 1900 until his death. He served as a theological and dogmatics professor in the Lviv college after himself having earned two doctorates in the course of his own studies. He earned a reputation as a learned and cultured man; these qualities led to Emperor Franz Joseph I nominating him for the Lviv archdiocese as its head. Pope Leo XIII named him as its archbishop and he set to work prioritizing a range of different pastoral initiatives aimed at revitalizing the faith within people and also prioritizing ecumenical cooperation with other denominations.

Bilczewski aided his people throughout the onslaught of World War I organizing relief and food for those displaced and those who became refugees; he likewise aided beggars and the homeless in his archdiocese. In 1918 he did all he could to smooth tensions during the Polish-Ukrainian War and he collaborated with his brother bishops in helping their people when the conflict escalated; he likewise did the same thing during the Bolshevik occupation of Poland and Ukraine while also collaborating with the apostolic nuncio Achille Ratti - the future Pope Pius XI.

His cause for sainthood commenced in 1944 and he became titled as a Servant of God while the confirmation of his life of heroic virtue allowed for him to be named as Venerable on 18 December 1997. The confirmation of a 1995 miraculous healing enabled Pope John Paul II to preside over Bilczewski's beatification in Lviv on 26 June 2001 while the recognition of another allowed Pope Benedict XVI to canonize him on 23 October 2005 in Saint Peter's Square.

== Life ==
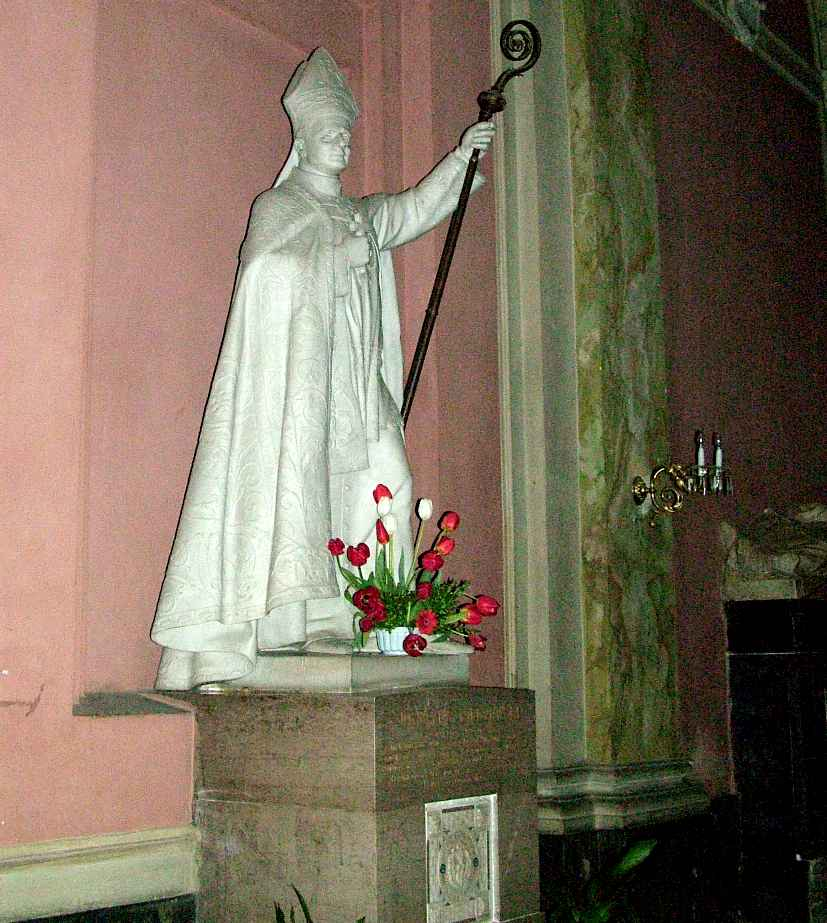
Statue in the Latin Cathedral in Lviv.

Józef Bilczewski was born in Wilamowice on 26 April 1860 as the eldest of nine children to commoners, Franciszek Biba and Anna Fajkisz. He has current living relatives, residing mainly in Poland, who bear the Biba, Pietrzak, Makuch and Lukaszka family names.

From 1868 until 1872 he attended school in his hometown while he studied later at Wadowice from 1872 until 1880 when he received a diploma. In 1880 he graduated from a local school in Wadowice and commenced his studies for the priesthood in Kraków.

He received his doctorate from the Jagiellonian and he received his ordination to the priesthood in 1884 from Cardinal Albin Dunajewski. Not long after he received his doctorate in theological studies in Vienna (studied there from 1885–86) in 1886 and started his studies on dogmatics and archaeological studies in Rome (at the Gregorian from 1886–87) and in Paris (one semester in 1888). From 1888 to 1890 he worked as a vicar and catechist at Kęty and in 1891 worked as a catechetical assistant in Kraków at the church of Saints Peter and Paul. In 1890 he passed his habilitation at the Jagiellonian and in 1891 he became a professor of dogmatics at the Lviv college. His career progressed at a fast pace as in 1893 he became a common professor and from 1896 to 1897 served as the Dean of the Theological Department. In 1900 he was elected as the rector of that college but gave up the post not long after once Emperor Franz Joseph I selected him on 30 October 1900 to lead the Archdiocese of Lviv as its archbishop; Pope Leo XIII formalized the appointment on 17 December 1900. Bilczewski received his episcopal consecration the next month in the Lviv Cathedral.

He supported organic work and started an extensive task on the construction of new churches in the area. He initiated the construction of more than 330 churches in his archdiocese including the monumental Saint Elizabeth Church. He also promoted the cultus of Blessed James of Strepar while in 1907 he allowed the Pallottines to settle in his archdiocese. The archbishop also encouraged devotion to the Sacred Heart of Jesus and urged priests to implement Eucharistic Adoration in their parishes. He also organized courses for the priests wanting to be prepared for social work among the poor and financed several Catholic societies. His support for the students made him a popular figure even to other denominations. In 1904 he organized the first Mariological Congress in Poland.

During World War I he was one of the people to create committees of relief for the workers of Galicia that the war had affected and had caused food shortages. During the Polish-Ukrainian War in 1918 and the Siege of Lviv he was responsible for the organization of food being sent for the besieged area. Bilczewski did his best alongside Andrzej Sheptytsky to help mediate and smooth tensions though this did not quite achieve positive results and the two worked with the apostolic nuncio Achille Ratti - future pope - in this regard. He also made several 'ad limina' visits to Rome to visit Leo XIII and Pope Pius X as well as Pope Benedict XV. His help for the poor and the homeless was awarded and the homeless themselves titled him as the "patron of louts" in 1917. From 1918 to 1921 his archdiocese lost 120 priests.

He died on 20 March 1923 due to a pernicious anemia which had first struck him not long before on 18 January; Pope Pius XI hailed him as one of the greatest bishops in the world and since 2001 his heart has been put in an urn and moved to the Lviv Cathedral. Since 20 March 1928, a monument to him has been in the cathedral.

=== Honours ===
In 1922 he received the second tier to the Cross of Valor and on 2 May 1922 was awarded the Grand Cross level of the Order of Polonia Restituta. He received an 'honoris causa' doctorate from the Warsaw college in 1921.

== Sainthood ==
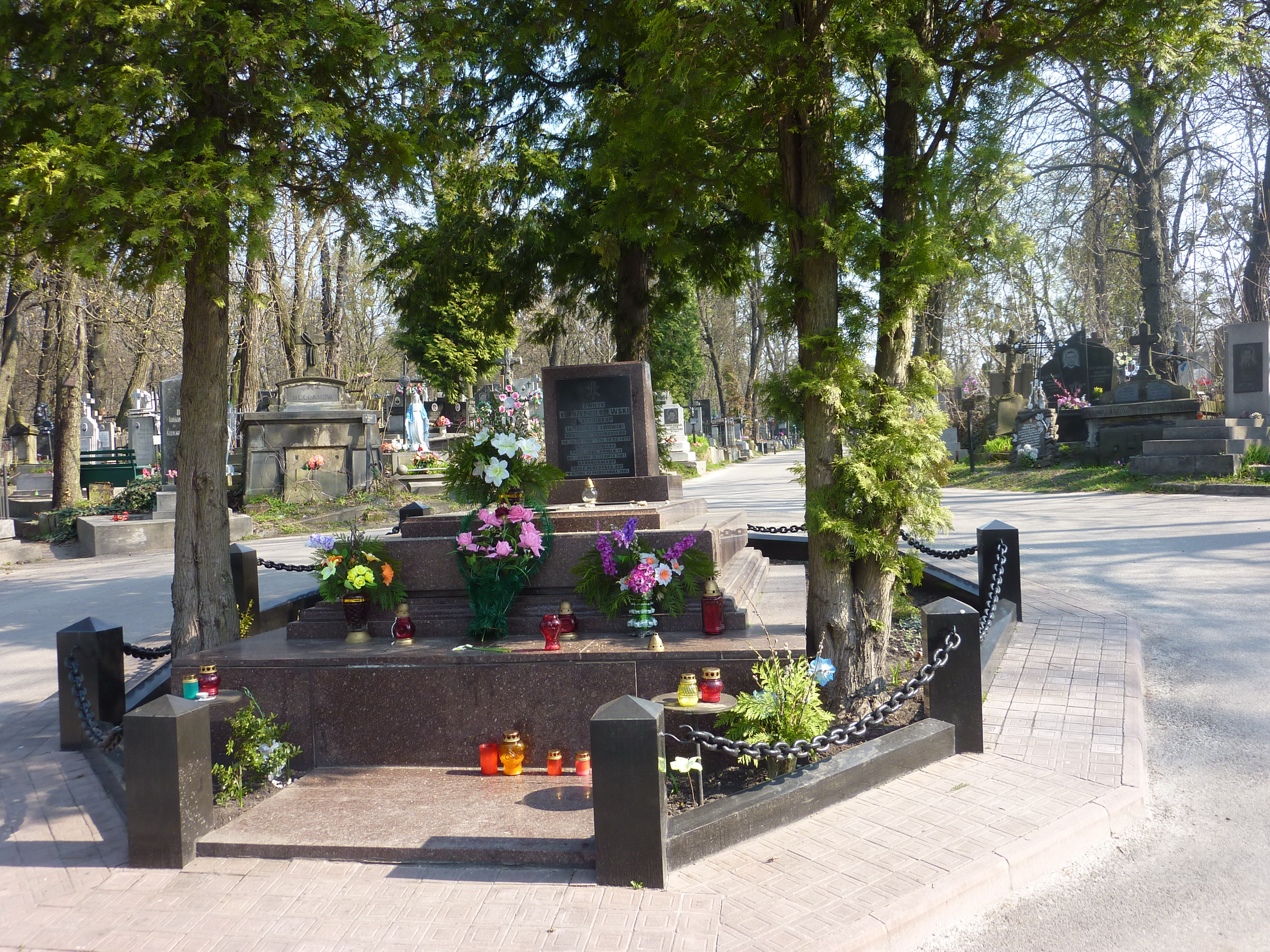
Grave.

The beatification process was introduced under Pope Pius XII on 2 July 1944 and the late archbishop became titled as a Servant of God as a result; the informative phase of the process did not open until 1952 and it later concluded in 1962 after documents and witness interrogatories were collected. These were placed in several boxes to be sent to Rome to the Congregation for Rites though the cause remained silent until 8 June 1990 when the Congregation for the Causes of Saints validated the informative phase. The postulation later submitted their Positio dossier to the C.C.S. in 1997 for assessment while it received the approval of theologians on 16 May 1997 and that of the C.C.S. on 11 November 1997. The confirmation of his model life of heroic virtue allowed for Pope John Paul II to title him as Venerable on 18 December 1997.

Bilczewski's beatification depended upon the approval of a miraculous healing. Marcin Gawlik (b. 1986) - aged nine at the time - suffered from third degree burns that all but disappeared on 24 July 1995 after appeals for Bilczewski's intercession. This was investigated in the diocese of origin before it was sent to the C.C.S. for validation and the approval of both a medical board and a commission of theologians. The C.C.S. approved this healing on 23 April 2001 as did John Paul II on 24 April 2001 who confirmed the beatification would take place while on his visit to Ukraine. John Paul II beatified the late archbishop at the Lviv Hippodrome on 26 June 2001.

One final miracle was required for sainthood. One case was investigated and sent to the C.C.S. who validated this process before medical experts approved the miraculous nature of the healing on 24 June 2004. Theologians attributed this healing came as a result of Bilczewski's intercession on 21 September 2004 while the C.C.S. approved the findings of the two previous boards on 9 November 2004. John Paul II approved this healing - therefore the canonization also - on 20 December 2004. Cardinal Angelo Sodano formalized the date on 24 February 2005 at a consistory representing the ill John Paul II who died over a month later. The new Pope Benedict XVI celebrated the canonization in Saint Peter's Square on 23 October 2005.

=== Patronage ===
Bilczewski has been the patron of his hometown since 5 October 2013. He is also the patron for beggars and homeless people as well as teachers and his archdiocese.

Catholic Church titles
Preceded by Seweryn Morawski	Archbishop of Lwów; 17 December 1900 – 20 March 1923	Succeeded by Bolesław Twardowski
