= Roman Catholic Seminary in Lviv =

Catholic seminary in Lviv, Ukraine

Seminary in Lviv (now the Seminary of the Archdiocese of Lviv in Lviv-Bryukhovychi) is a Roman Catholic seminary founded in Lviv in 1703.

The university was founded in 1703 as a seminary Cathedral in Lviv. After the partition of Polish, Austrian authorities in 1783 in Lviv formed the so-called General Seminar for all the dioceses of Galicia. The place of the seminar were the buildings of former monastery Carmelite Calced in Lviv (later Ossolineum. In 1814, a seminar Lviv separated from the Seminar General. The new location of the seminar were in buildings post-monastery Discalced Carmelites. Until World War II alumni seminar benefited from the intellectual formation of the Faculty of Theology of the University of Jan Kazimierz Lviv. After the end of World War II and the deportation of Poles from Lviv, in 1945 the seminary was moved to Kalwaria Zebrzydowska, but already in 1950, the communist authorities liquidated them.

The seminar resumed its operations on Dec. 12, 1996 Street. Lviv 62 in Bryukhovychi in Lviv. Since the historic buildings Seminary in Lviv have not been returned by the Ukrainian authorities, the seminary was founded in ruined purchased the sanatorium complex in Bryukhovychi near Lviv.

The first rector of the seminary reborn after World War I was the rector Fr. prof. of Lviv University Kazimierz Wais, and after World War II Metropolitan of Lviv Fr. Archbishop Marian Jaworski, rector of the seminary was also Fr. Bishop Boleslaw Twardowski, and Vice-Rector Prof. Bishop. Leon Wałęga. Currently, the rector is Fr. Piotr Brzeski

== Lecturers Seminar ==
- Stanisław Frankl - Polish Roman Catholic priest, rector of the Seminary in Lviv.
- Rafal Kiernicki - Polish Roman Catholic bishop, auxiliary bishop of Lviv during 1991-1995.
- Franciszek Lisowski - Polish auxiliary bishop of Lviv during the years 1928-1933, bishop of Tarnów in the years 1933-1939, rector of the Seminary in Lviv, professor and dean of the Faculty of Theology of the University of Lviv.
- Leon Malyi - Polish auxiliary bishop of the Archdiocese of Lviv of the Latin rite.
- Jan Stepa - Polish bishop of Tarnów, rector of the Seminary in Lviv, Lviv University professor.

== Graduates and Students Seminar ==
- Aleksander Fedorowicz - Polish Roman Catholic priest, pastor, preacher.
- Tadeusz Fedorowicz - Polish Roman Catholic priest, spiritual director of the Institute for the Blind in Laski, the organizer of the National Pastoral Care of the Blind.
- Izaak Mikołaj Isakowicz - Armenian Catholic Archbishop of Lviv, social activist, philanthropist, writer, theologian, Polish patriot.
- Marian Jaworski - Polish Roman Catholic bishop, apostolic administrator of the Polish part of the Lvov archdiocese, based in Komotini in the years 1984-1991, the Archbishop of Lviv in the period 1991-2008, since 2008 the archbishop of the Archdiocese of Lviv senior cardinal priest since 2001 (in pectore since 1998).
- Ludwik Rutyna - Polish Roman Catholic clergyman, activist Borderlands.
- Adam Stefan Sapieha - Polish Roman Catholic bishop, the diocesan Bishop of Kraków, Cardinal priest since 1946, a senator of the Second Republic, a leading figure in the history of the Polish Church of the twentieth century.
- Józef Smaczniak - Polish Roman Catholic priest, philanthropist, activist of the underground during World War II.
- Józef Teodorowicz - Armenian Catholic Archbishop of Lviv, theologian, politician, Member of Parliament, Legislative, and then senator of the first term in the Second Polish Republic.
- Ignacy Tokarczuk - Polish diocesan bishop of Przemysl in the years 1965-1992 (in 1992-1993 Archbishop), since 1993 a senior archbishop of the Archdiocese of Przemysl.
- Stanisław Turkowski - Polish Roman Catholic priest, doctor of theology, Prelate, religious education inspector, lecturer catechetics.
- Bolesław Twardowski - Polish Roman Catholic bishop, auxiliary bishop of Lviv during the years 1918-1923, the Archbishop of Lviv in the years 1923-1944.
- Józef Widawski - Polish Roman Catholic priest, a participant of the war against the Bolsheviks in 1920 and a bachelor Cross of Valour.
- Józef Grzegorz Wojtarowicz - Polish diocesan bishop of Tarnów in the years 1840-1850.
- Jan Wujda - Polish Roman Catholic priest, Canon, priest of the Diocese of Koszalin-Kolobrzeg, president and CEO of the Minor Seminary in Gorzow Wielkopolski, pastor pioneer in the Recovered Territories.
