= Adam Stefan Sapieha =

Polish Roman Catholic archbishop (1867–1951)

His Eminence, Prince Adam Stefan Sapieha
- Cardinal, Archbishop of Kraków
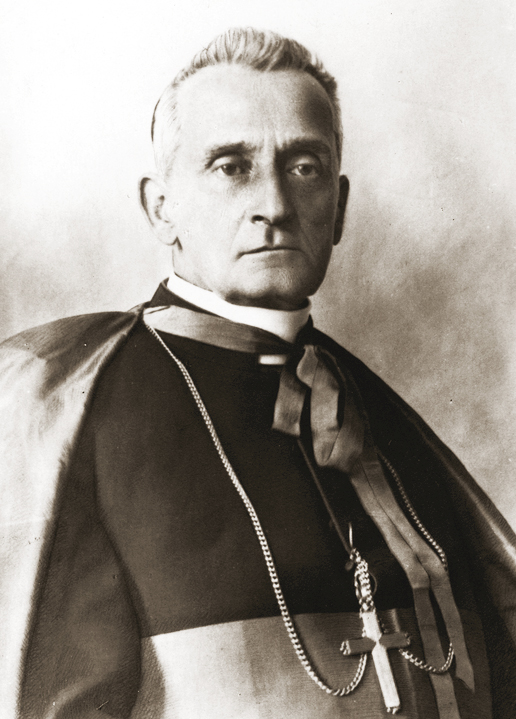
- Church: Catholic Church
- Archdiocese: Kraków
- Appointed: 24 November 1911
- Term ended: 23 July 1951
- Predecessor: Jan Puzyna de Kosielsko
- Successor: Eugeniusz Baziak
- Other post: Cardinal-Priest of Santa Maria Nuova

Orders
- Ordination: 1 October 1893 by Jan Maurycy Pawel Puzyna de Kosielsko
- Consecration: 17 December 1911 by Pius X
- Created cardinal: 18 February 1946 by Pius XII
- Rank: Cardinal-Priest

Personal details
- Born: Prince Adam Stefan Stanisław Bonfatiusz Józef Sapieha; 14 May 1867 Krasiczyn, Kingdom of Galicia and Lodomeria, Austrian Empire (now in Poland)
- Died: 23 July 1951 (aged 84) Kraków, Poland
- Buried: Wawel Cathedral
- Denomination: Roman Catholic
- Motto: Crux mihi foederis arcus
- Signature: Adam Stefan Sapieha's signature

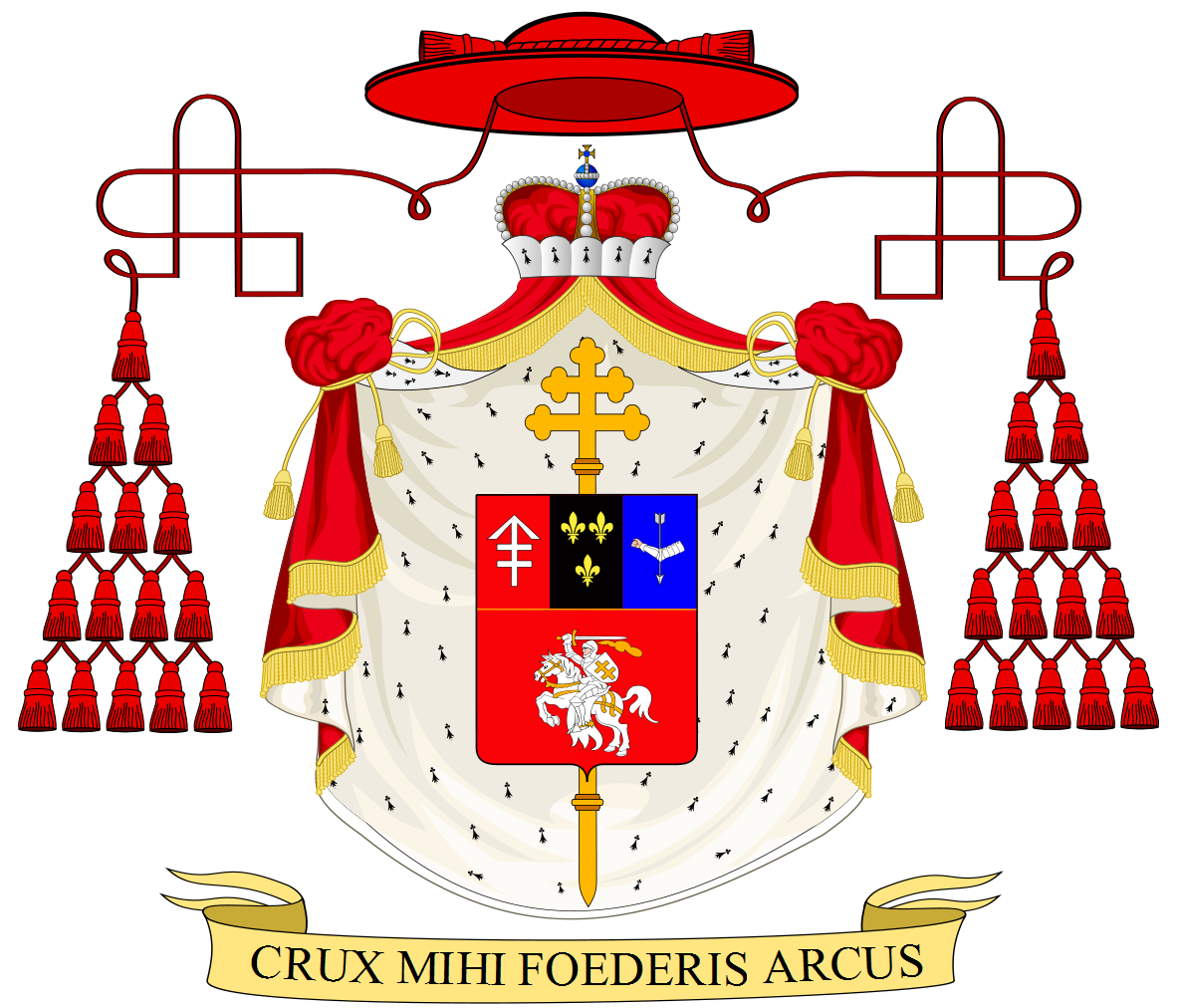
- Coat of arms: Adam Stefan Sapieha's coat of arms

Adam Stefan Sapieha
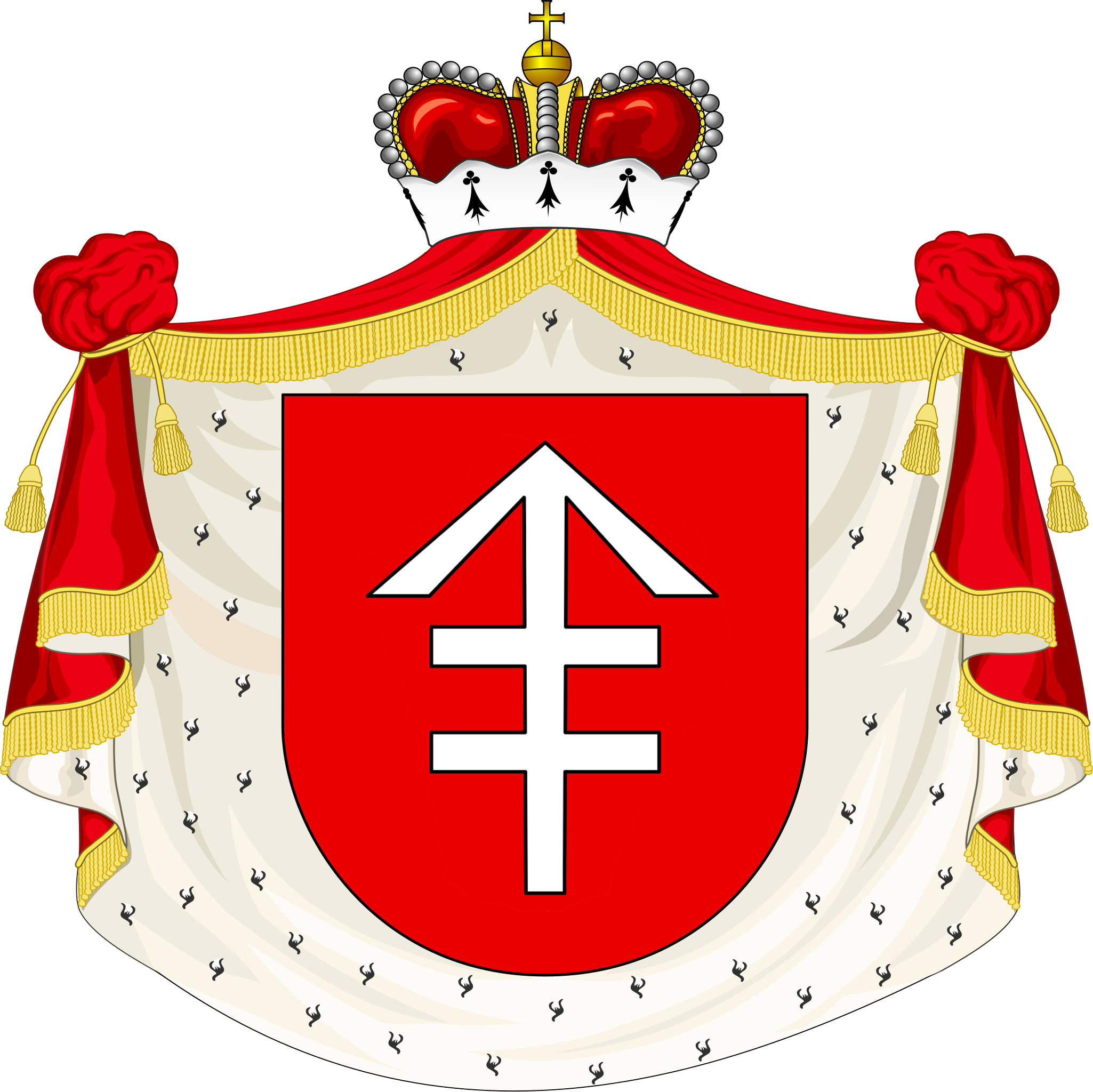
- Coat of arms: Lis coat of arms
- Family: Sapieha

Styles of Prince Adam Stefan Cardinal Sapieha
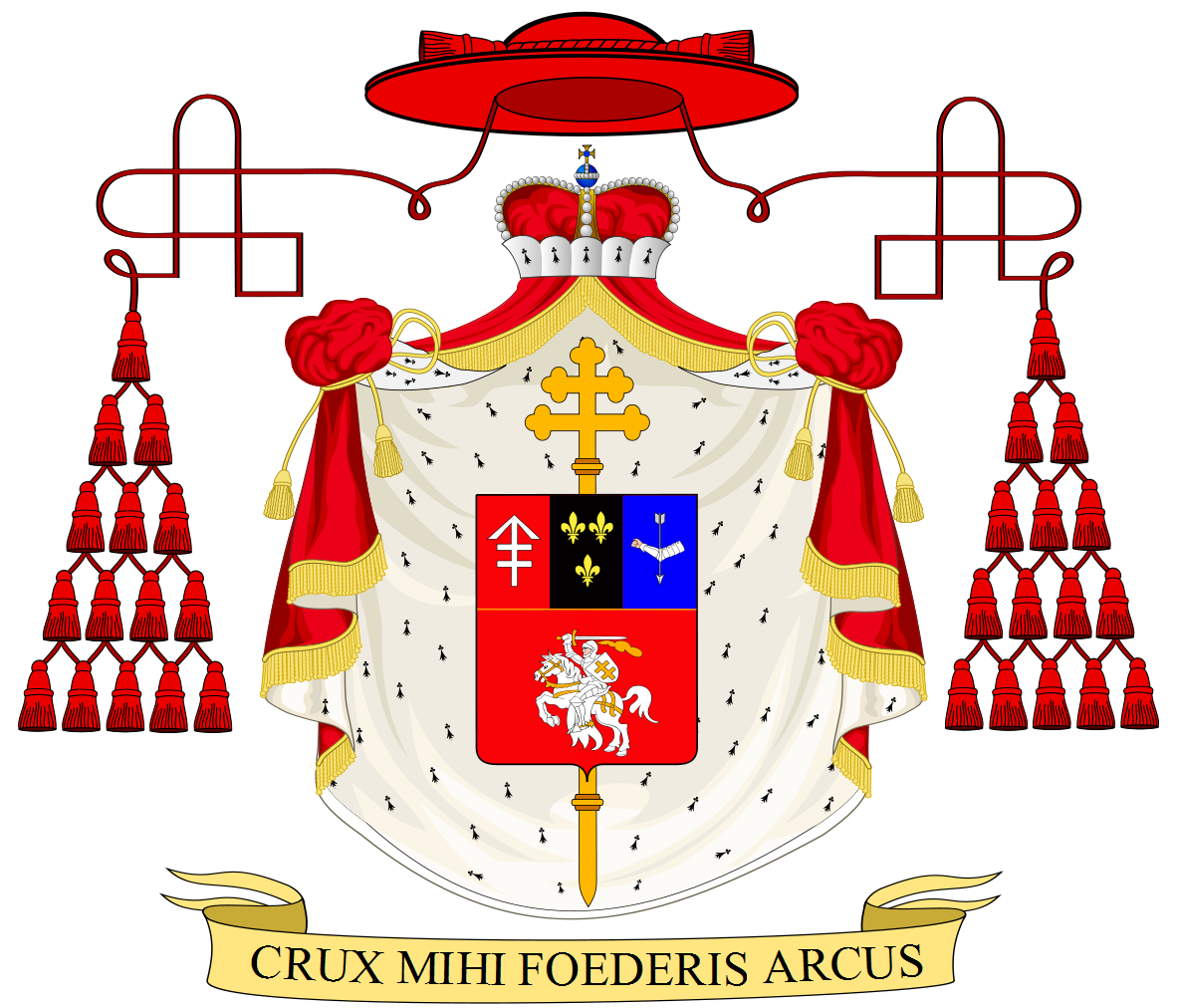
- Reference style: His Eminence
- Spoken style: Your Eminence
- Religious style: (autofilled)
- Informal style: Cardinal
- See: Kraków

Prince Adam Stefan Stanisław Bonifacy Józef Sapieha (Polish pronunciation: [ˈadam ˈstɛfan saˈpjɛxa]; 14 May 1867 – 23 July 1951) was a Polish Catholic prelate who served as Archbishop of Kraków from 1911 to 1951. A member of the Polish nobility, between 1922 and 1923 he was a senator of the Second Polish Republic. In 1946, Pope Pius XII made him a cardinal.

== Early life ==
Sapieha was born in 1867 in the castle of Krasiczyn, then part of the Austrian Empire. His family, originally from the Grand Duchy of Lithuania, were members of the Polish nobility. He was the youngest of the seven children of Prince Adam Stanisław Sapieha-Kodenski and Princess Jadwiga Klementyna Sanguszko-Lubartowicza, daughter of Prince Władysław Hieronim Sanguszko. His elder brother, Prince Władysław Leon Sapieha, is the great-grandfather of Queen Mathilde of the Belgians.

== Education and early vocation ==
After graduating from gymnasium in Lwów in 1886, he enrolled in the Law Department at the University of Vienna, starting simultaneously law studies at Institut Catholique in Lille. In 1887 on the basis of his certificate from the University of Vienna Sapieha continued studies at the Jagiellonian University in Kraków. After two years he passed the examination and returned to Vienna for further studies, where he remained until 1890, obtaining the certificate of completion.

In the same year he began theological studies at the University of Innsbruck, and in 1892 signed up for the third year of the Major Roman Catholic Theological Seminary in Lviv. He was then educated at the Pontifical Gregorian University in Rome, where he was also ordained as priest of Lviv (Lwów, Lemberg) on 1 October 1893 by Bishop Jan Puzyna de Kosielsko (later Bishop of Kraków and Cardinal). Father Sapieha was despatched first to Jazłowiec (college) to act as chaplain to the school and to the attached convent in Yazlovets in the Archdiocese of Lwów, before, in October 1895, he started further studies in Rome. There he obtained a doctorate of civil and canon law at the Pontifical Ecclesiastical Academy. At the same time he studied diplomacy at the Pontifical Academy of Ecclesiastical Nobles.

After returning to the home country in 1897, he was designated vice-rector of the diocesan seminary in Lviv and eventually became its rector. He resigned because he was discouraged by the imposed rules of education of young priests. After a half-year trip across the United States, he was designated a vicar of the St. Nicholas congregation in Lviv in October 1902. In 1905 Sapieha was appointed a papal chamberlain, and sent to Rome where he was a consultant on matters concerning the Roman Catholic Church in Poland, in the annexed territories, the realization of an idea by Lviv Armenian Catholic Archbishop Józef Teodorowicz (who was the Sapieha's long-term friend) to have a representative of the Roman Catholic Church in Poland at the Roman Curia.

== Bishop ==
Sapieha was appointed Bishop of Kraków on 24 November 1911 and was consecrated by Pope Pius X in the Sistine Chapel on 7 December of the same year. In 1915, he established a relief committee for victims of World War I.

After World War I, Sapieha became a vocal opponent of the new concordat negotiated between the Holy See and the newly resurrected Polish state. He argued that the Polish Church should be completely independent of the state and that its primate should be the Archbishop of Warsaw. This attitude led to a conflict with Archbishop Achille Ratti, Pope Benedict XV's nuncio who later became pope, during the first post-war congress of Polish bishops in Gniezno held 26–30 August 1919. Sapieha thought that the Poles themselves should decide their affairs without outside influence and asked Ratti to leave the conference room. After Ratti became Pope Pius XI in 1922, he did not make Sapieha a cardinal even though his two predecessors as bishop of Krakow had been honored with that title, and not even after Krakow became an archdiocese.

In 1922, Sapieha was elected senator from the Christian Union of National Unity party. He ordered a memorial service and issued a proclamation on the assassination of Gabriel Narutowicz. It was the only speech he delivered as a senator because papal mandate at the time prohibited clergy from holding public office. He resigned on 9 March 1923.

Sapieha was appointed Metropolitan Archbishop in 1925 when the Diocese of Kraków was elevated to the rank of Archdiocese. He received a degree honoris causa from the Jagiellonian University in 1926. In September 1930, after opposition leaders were arrested and placed in confinement at Brest Fortress, Archbishops Sapieha and Teodorowicz strongly criticized the government. Despite this, and other occasional disagreements with the government, Sapieha was awarded the Order of the White Eagle in 1936.

In 1937, Sapieha, who had opposed the Pilsudski regime (sanacja), made the controversial decision to move Piłsudski's body, within Wawel's Cathedral, from St. Leonard's Crypt to the crypt under the Silver Bells.

In 1939 he asked Pope Pius XI to accept his resignation due to age and failing health, but the pope refused. After the death of Pius XI, he repeated his request to the new pope, Pius XII on 19 June 1939. In anticipation of the upcoming war and at Józef Beck's instigation he withdrew his resignation.

=== Activities during the Second World War ===
During World War II, after the flight of Cardinal Hlond, Sapieha was the center of the battle against the German occupation, to the extent that George Weigel has dubbed him the 'uncrowned king of Poland'. One of the most important organisations to which he belonged was the National Council of Welfare, created on the model of Caritas. From the war's start of the Nazi occupation, he was an independence activist, working with the Polish government-in-exile.

It is argued that Sapieha claimed that Jews were a "depraved race" and blamed them for both capitalist ill treatment as well as Communism. It is also alleged that he made no condemnation of the Holocaust while it was occurring to the German authorities. However, Sapieha interceded to Hans Frank about Jewish people in Kraków twice, and attempted to inform the Vatican about plans for the Holocaust on two times, despite his isolation from Rome.

In August 1944, Sapieha was forced to operate the Polish seminary in secret because the Germans began killing seminarians whenever they found them. He moved his students (including the future Pope John Paul II, Karol Wojtyła) into the Bishop's Palace in Kraków to finish their training during the Nazi Occupation of Poland.

Sapieha's biographer, Jacek Czajkowski describes the circumstances of the archbishop being invited by Governor Hans Frank to Hitler's birthday party in April 1942. He told the German official: "No! They are not going to change anything, but they will take a photograph of me and write that a Polish bishop arrived at Hitler's birthday party with best wishes. Tell him I will not come." Another such anecdote recalls when governor Hans Frank ordered the archbishop to hand him the keys to the Wawel Castle. Sapieha replied: "But don't forget to give them back to me when you will be leaving Wawel."

== Cardinal ==
In March 1945, he initiated the publication of Tygodnik Powszechny. He was created Cardinal-Priest, of the title of Santa Maria Nuova, on 18 February 1946. On 1 November 1946 he conferred priestly ordination on Karol Wojtyła in the chapel of his episcopal residence. After the Kielce pogrom he demonstrated his anti-Semitic attitudes when he reportedly stated that the Jews had brought it upon themselves but then provided aid for the affected Jews. According to witness, he and the church complained there were too many Jews in the government.

Sapieha visted the school that Karol Wojtyła (later John Paul II) attended, with a young Wojtyła delivering a welcoming speech to Sapieha. Some people consider him a mentor of Pope John Paul II. In 1949, he proposed that Stefan Wyszyński, Metropolitan Archbishop of Gniezno and Warsaw since 12 November 1948, should be termed Primate of Poland.

The following year (1950), he wrote letters to the then Polish president, Boleslaw Bierut, protesting against Bierut's repression of the church. Sapieha died on 23 July 1951, and his funeral on 28 July turned into a political demonstration. He was buried in Wawel Cathedral, in the crypt under the confessional of St. Stanislas.

== Portrayal ==
In the 2005 CBS miniseries Pope John Paul II, Archbishop Sapieha was portrayed by American actor James Cromwell.

== Sources ==
=== Book ===
- Weigel, George (2005). Witness to Hope: The Biography of Pope John Paul II. HarperCollins. ISBN 0-06-073203-2.

== Bibliography ==
- Stępień, Stanisław. "Kardynał Adam Stefan Sapieha Środowisko Rodzinne, Życie i Dzieło", Przymyśl, 1995

Catholic Church titles
Preceded by Jan Puzyna de Kosielsko	Bishop of Kraków; 24 November 1911–1925	Promoted to archdiocese
New title	Archbishop of Kraków; 1925–23 July 1951	Succeeded by Eugeniusz Baziak apostolic administrator, 1951–1962; Karol Jozef Wojtyla
