= Archdiocese of Lviv =

Archdiocese of Lviv may refer to the following ecclesiastical jurisdictions
with archiepiscopal see at Lviv (Lvov, Lemberg) in western Ukraine :

- Roman Catholic Archdiocese of Lviv, a Metropolitan archbishopric of the Latin Church
- Ukrainian Catholic Archeparchy of Lviv, an archeparchy of the Ukrainian Greek Catholic Church
- Armenian Catholic Archeparchy of Lviv
