= Jan Cieński =

Roman Catholic bishop

- Clandestine Auxiliary Bishop of Roman Catholic Archdiocese of Lviv
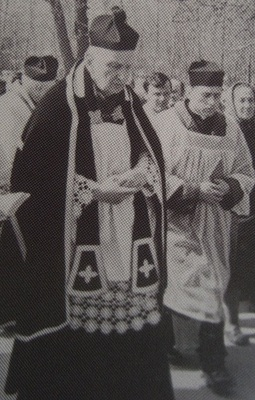
- Church: Roman Catholic Church
- Appointed: 30 June 1967
- Term ended: 26 December 1992
- Other post: Parish priest in Zolochiv (1945–1992)

Orders
- Ordination: 26 June 1938 (Priest) by Bolesław Twardowski
- Consecration: 30 June 1967 (Bishop) by Cardinal Stefan Wyszyński

Personal details
- Born: Jan Cieński; 7 January 1905 Peniaky, Austro-Hungarian Empire (present day Lviv Oblast, Ukraine)
- Died: 26 December 1992 (aged 87) Zolochiv, Lviv Oblast, Ukraine

Bishop Jan Cieński (Ukrainian: Ян Ценський; 7 January 1905 – 26 December 1992) was a Roman Catholic clandestine prelate from Ukraine as an Auxiliary bishop of Archdiocese of Lviv and a single Roman Catholic prelate in Ukraine since 30 June 1967 until 16 January 1991, when a Roman Catholic hierarchy was reestablished in Ukraine.

== Life ==
Bishop Cieński was born in the noble szlachta family of a politician Tadeusz Cieński and Maria (née countess Dzieduszycka) Cieńska in present-day Western Ukraine. His maternal grandfather was Polish landowner, naturalist, political activist, collector and patron of arts of Ukrainian origins Count Włodzimierz Dzieduszycki.

After graduation of the gymnasium education, future Bishop continued to study at the Agrarian Academy in Dubliany, with graduation in 1928, and subsequently joined Faculty of Low of the University of Lviv. After that he joined the Major Roman Catholic Theological Seminary in Lviv in 1933 and was ordained as priest on June 26, 1938, by Archbishop Bolesław Twardowski, while completed of the theological studies.

During 1938–1945 he served as an assistant priest in Zolochiv, in the same time worked as a chaplain of the Polish Home Army and clandestinely rescued Jews in the Holocaust persecution. In a period of the Polish population transfers (1944–1946) he remained in the Soviet Union and continued to serve as a parish priest in Zolociv (1945–1992) under the Communist persecution of the religion.

In 1962 Bishop Cieński was clandestinely appointed by Pope John XXIII as an Auxiliary Bishop of the Archdiocese of Lviv. But his consecration happened only on June 30, 1967, when he was consecrated as bishop by Metropolitan Archbishop Stefan Cardinal Wyszyński and other prelates of the Roman Catholic Church privately in Gniezno, Poland.

Bishop Jan Cieński secretly ordained several Greek Catholic and Roman Catholic priests, one of them being Bishop Leon Malyi, auxiliary bishop of Archdiocese of Lviv.
