= Pope Leo XIII and Poland =

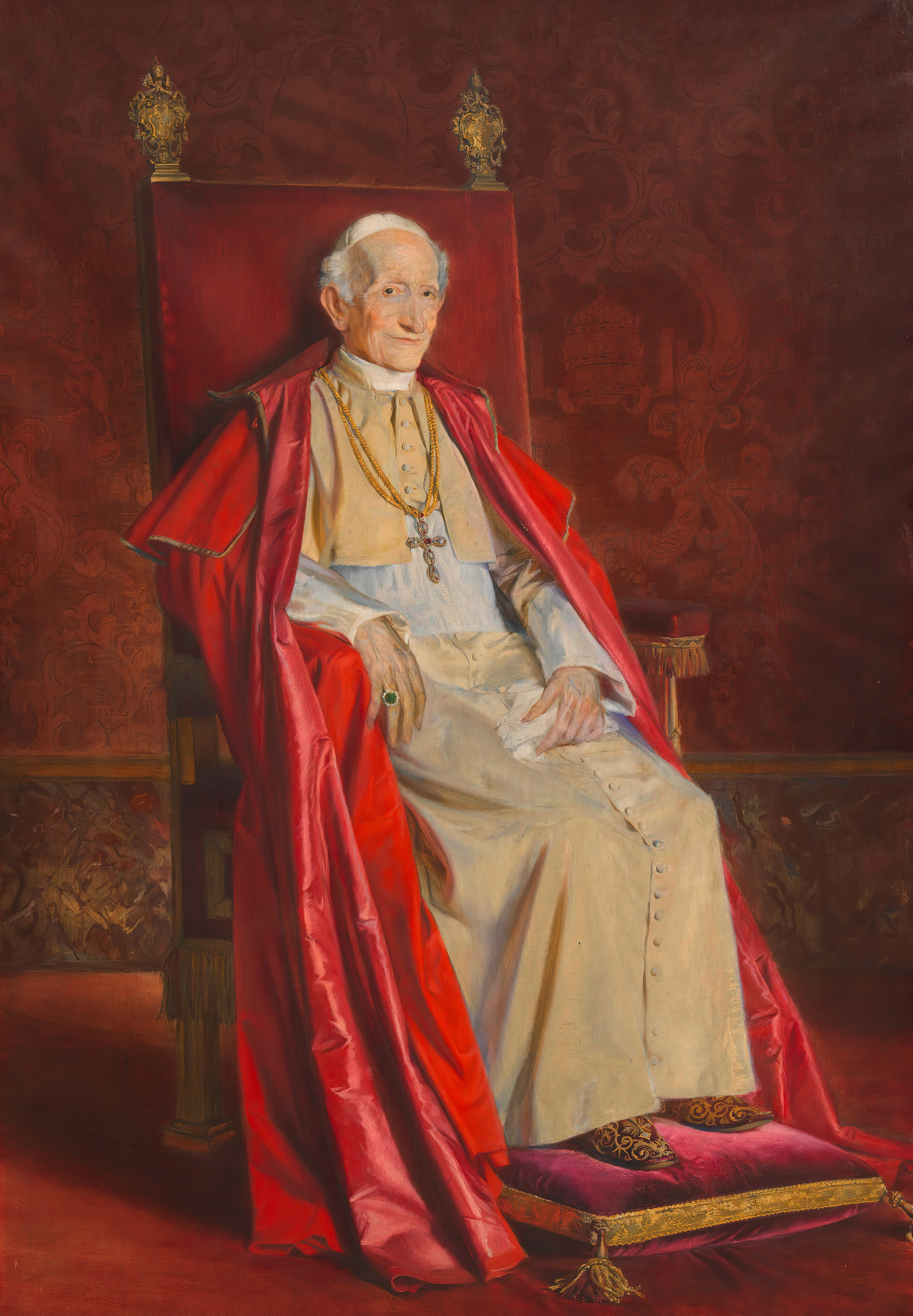
Pope Leo XIII in 1900

The relationship between Pope Leo XIII and Poland was marked by the German-led Kulturkampf, which led to the persecution of ethnic Poles in Prussia and German Catholics in Germany.

== Germanisation under Bismarck ==
In Prussia, Polish Catholics were persecuted as Poles and, during the Kulturkampf, together with German Catholics, as Catholics as well: The Kulturkampf, which Otto von Bismarck began in 1871, insinuated a Polish-Catholic-Austrian connection. It was a vehicle for germanisation, as everything Polish including the language were banned from schools and offices.

== Jailing of Polish priests ==
Polish priests, who taught Catholic religion in Polish were punished and jailed. Like their German counterparts, their sermons were observed and led to jail sentences as well. In 1874, Cardinal Mieczyslaw Ledóchowski was jailed.

== Political allies among German bishops ==
Unlike in Russia, they had powerful allies among German Catholic hierarchy and Catholic politicians like Matthias Erzberger, the most prominent Catholic politician during World War I, who often functioned as go-between with the Vatican. (Erzberger 41 ff) Indeed, after Vatican communications, Erzberger promoted a Polish kingdom to be proclaimed in Kraków with loose ties to Austria-Hungary, for which he had support in the Vatican and even Germany (Erzberger, 173) but not from the Hungarian Prime Minister Tisza in Vienna, who was afraid of losing ethnic influence.

== Political association with Austria-Hungary ==
According to Erzberger, Germany proposed on one hand a large Poland to be associated with Austria-Hungary and Germany in a central-European economic union. On the other hand, German fiscal policies continued discriminating against Polish interests. Largely due to the British blockage against Germany, Polish populations suffered from hunger during German occupation, with the result, that Prussian popularity reached all time lows during World War I.

== Polish veto at Papal conclave ==
During the conclave of 1903, according to its Secretary Rafael Merry del Val, Cardinal Jan Puzyna de Kosielsko of Kraków came to see him, demanding to announce his veto against Cardinal Rampolla in the name of Emperor Franz Joseph I of Austria. Merry Del Val protested and refused to even accept the document, which, in the heat of the debate fell on the floor and was picked up by Jan Puzyna de Kosielsko. The College of Cardinals, was outraged. Rampolla, according to Merry del Val, actually gained votes after the veto. Later, he opined to Ludwig von Pastor that Rampolla never had a chance, because the cardinals wanted a new direction after the pontificate of Pope Leo XIII. After his election, the new Pope Pius X decreed automatic excommunication on anyone who should try to influence a conclave with a threat or veto.
