= Dura, Africa =

Ancient city

Africa Proconsularis

Dura was an ancient city and bishopric in Roman North Africa, which remains a Latin Catholic titular see.

== History ==
Dura was among the many cities in the Roman province of Byzacena that became a suffragan diocese. Its precise Roman location, in present-day Tunisia, remains unknown.

Its only historically documented bishop, Quodvultdeus, was among the Catholic bishops attending the Council of Carthage called in 484 by king Huneric of the Vandal Kingdom on the heresy Donatism, after which and many of his party were exiled, unlike their schismatic counterparts (none of which is named for Dura).

== Titular see ==
The ancient city has been used as a titular see in the 17th and 19th centuries and regularly from 1933 to the present as the Latin titular bishopric of Dura (Latin: Curiate Italian) / Duren(sis) (Latin adjective).

It has been held as a titular see by the following bishops:

- Franciscus Antonius von und zu Losenstein (1690.11.27 – death 1692.06.17) as Coadjutor Bishop of Olomouc (Olmütz, Moravia, now a Czech Metropolitan) (1690.11.27 – 1692.06.17)
- Patriarch Francisco de São Luiz Saraiva, Benedictine Congregation of Portugal and Brazil (O.S.B.) (1824.04.30 – 1843.04.03), in between prelatures; previously Coadjutor Bishop of Coimbra (Portugal) (1821.04.19 – 1822.04.16), succeeding as Bishop of Coimbra (1822.04.16 – 1824.04.30); later Latin Patriarch of Lisboa (Lisbon, Portugal) ([1840] 1843.04.03 – death 1845.05.07), created Cardinal-Priest with no Title assigned (1843.06.19 – 1845.05.07)
- René-Fernand-Bernardin Collin, Friars Minor (O.F.M.) (1949.05.26 – 1958.12.21), first as Coadjutor Vicar Apostolic of Port-Said (Egypt) (1949.05.26 – 1952.01.18), then succeeding as Apostolic Vicar of Port-Said (1952.01.18 – 1958.12.21); later Bishop of Digne (France) (1958.12.21 – retired 1980), died 1985
- Knut Ansgar Nelson, English Benedictine Congregation (E.B.C.- (1962.07.02 – death 1990.03.31) as emeritate; previously Titular Bishop of Bilta (1947.08.11 – 1957.10.01) as Coadjutor Vicar Apostolic of Sweden (1947.08.11 – 1953.06.29) and (see) promoted as Coadjutor Bishop of Stockholm (Sweden) (1953.06.29 – 1957.10.01); later succeeded as Bishop of Stockholm (1957.10.01 – 1962.07.02)
- Rafal Wladyslaw Kiernicki, Conventual Franciscans (O.F.M. Conv.) (1991.01.16 – death 1995.11.23) as Auxiliary Bishop of Archdiocese of Lviv (Ukraine) (1991.01.16 – 1995.11.23)
- Aloysius Paul D'Souza (born India) (1996.01.11 – 1996.11.08) as Auxiliary Bishop of Mangalore (India) (1996.01.11 – 1996.11.08); next succeeded as Bishop of Mangalore (1996.11.08 – )
- Anthony Giroux Meagher (later Archbishop) (1997.04.30 – 2002.04.27)
- Rafael Francisco Martínez Sáinz (2002.06.19 – 2016.11.06)
- (2016.12.20 – ): Allwyn D’Silva, Auxiliary Bishop of Bombay (India)

== See also ==
- List of Catholic dioceses in Tunisia

== Sources and external links ==
- GCatholic
