= Mieczysław Mokrzycki =

Roman Catholic archbishop of Lviv

The Most Reverend Mieczysław Mokrzycki
- Archbishop of Lviv of the Latins
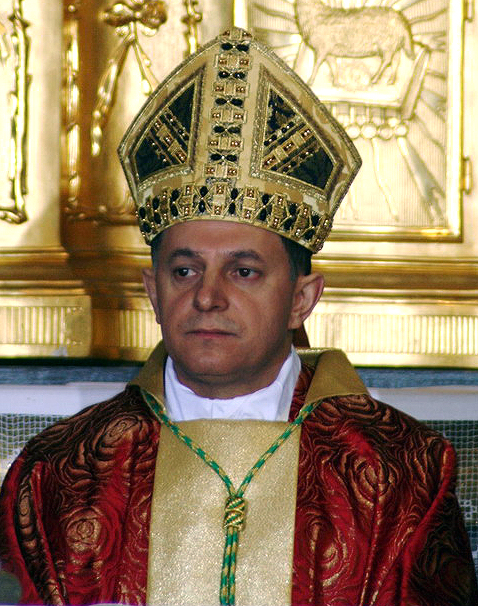
- Diocese: Lviv
- See: Lviv
- Installed: 21 October 2008
- Predecessor: Marian Jaworski
- Successor: incumbent
- Other post: Coadjutor Archbishop of Lviv of the Latins (2007–2008)

Orders
- Ordination: 17 September 1987 by Marian Jaworski
- Consecration: 29 September 2007 by Pope Benedict XVI

Personal details
- Born: 29 March 1961 (age 65) Majdan Lipowiecki, Polish People’s Republic
- Denomination: Roman Catholic
- Education: Pontifical University of Saint Thomas Aquinas, Angelicum
- Motto: Humilitas (English: Humility)
- Coat of arms

Mieczysław Mokrzycki (Note: Ukrainian: Мечислав Мокшицький, transcribed Mechyslav Mokshytskyi) (born 29 March 1961 in Majdan Lipowiecki) is a Polish-born Catholic prelate, currently serving as the archbishop of Lviv of the Latins in Ukraine.

== Early life and ordination ==
Mokrzycki completed primary school in Łukawiec and Cieszanów, and then studied at the State Agricultural Technical School in Oleszyce. After graduating from high school, he studied theology at the Catholic University of Lublin. He was ordained a priest on September 17, 1987 by Marian Jaworski, who was diocesan archbishop of Lviv at that time, based in Lubaczów. In 1991 Mokrzycki left for pastoral work in Ukraine. In 1996 he obtained a Doctorate of Sacred Theology from the Pontifical University of Saint Thomas Aquinas, Angelicum. His dissertation was entitled "La formazione sacerdotale nell'arcidiocesi di Leopoli dei Latini alla luce dei recenti documenti dopo il Concilio Vaticano II (Priestly Formation in the Archdiocese of Lviv of the Latins in light of recent documents after Vatican II).".

== Career ==
On 16 July 2007 he was appointed coadjutor archbishop of Lviv, and consecrated on 29 September 2007 by Pope Benedict XVI as principal consecrator and Cardinals Tarcisio Bertone and Marian Jaworski as co-consecrators. He was one of six bishops consecrated on that day, and the first consecrated by Pope Benedict after his election as Pope. On 21 October 2008 he became Archbishop of the Roman Catholic Archdiocese of Lviv of the Latins (Ukraine) after the resignation of Cardinal Jaworski. On 29 September 2007 Archbishop Mokrzycki was honoured by Lech Kaczyński, the president of Poland, with the Officer's Cross of the Order of Polonia Restituta, for outstanding services to the Polish Church, working for the Poles in Ukraine. He received the pallium from Pope Benedict in June 2009 at a traditional Mass marking the feast of the Solemnity of the Holy Apostles Saints Peter and Paul.

== Criticism ==
- According to online publication The Religious Information Service of Ukraine, on 27 September 2011, in an interview with Polonia Radio abp. Mokrzycki, the head of the Ukrainian Roman Catholics, stated that "the Greek Catholic Church has simply seized our churches." This provoked an extremely negative reaction from both the Greek Catholic and Roman Catholic communities. However, he did not apologize or refute the statement.
- On 6 March 2013, Mokrzycki refused to sign a joint statement by the Catholic bishops of the Greek Catholic and Roman Catholic rites of Ukraine on the occasion of the 70th anniversary of the Massacres of Poles in Volhynia, blaming the tragedy on Ukrainians. The archbishop noted that the formula "we apologize and ask for forgiveness" proposed by Ukrainian Greek Catholics is unacceptable. The Ukrainian side must "apologize and beg apologize" to the Poles, but not apologizing to the Poles.

== See also ==
- Roman Catholic Archdiocese of Lviv
- List of Roman Catholic bishops of Lviv

== Sources ==
- http://www.catholic-hierarchy.org/bishop/bmokr.html
- http://www.gcatholic.org/dioceses/diocese/lviv1.htm

Catholic Church titles
| Preceded by Marian Jaworski | Archbishop of Lviv; 2008–present | Incumbent |
