= Mikołaj Torosowicz =

- Archeparch
- Church: Armenian Catholic Church
- Archdiocese: Armenian Catholic Archeparchy of Lviv
- Appointed: November 8, 1630
- Term ended: October 24, 1681
- Predecessor: First Eparch
- Successor: Vartan Hunanian

Orders
- Ordination: January 8, 1627

Personal details
- Born: 1605 Lviv
- Died: October 24, 1681 (aged 75–76) Lviv

Mikołaj Torosowicz (in Ukrainian: Миколай Торосович, Mykolai Torosovych; born 1605 in Lviv – October 24, 1681), was the first Armenian Catholic bishop of Lviv.

== Biography ==
Torosowicz was born in Lviv in a wealthy Yakov Torosovich's Armenian apostolic merchant family. At that time, the Armenians of Galicia were under ecclesiastical jurisdiction of the patriarch of the See of Echmiadzin, in Armenia, then under Persian rule.

With religious vocation, he was sent by his parents to Istanbul. and was ordained a priest in 1626 in Istanbul, and on 8 January 1627 Torosowicz was appointed bishop of Lviv of the Armenian Apostolic Church.

On October 24, 1630, Torosowicz made a profession of faith in a Carmelite Catholic church of Discalced Carmelites, and entered himself along with his diocese in communion with the Catholic Church. The union was confirmed by the Holy See on November 8 of the same year, and Torosowicz became the first Armenian Catholic archbishop of Lviv.

On 22 May 1635 Torosowicz made a new confession of faith to the Pope Urban VIII in Rome, and was named Metropolitan of Lviv, with jurisdiction over all Armenians from Poland, Moldova and Wallachia. It was also he who led the Theatines to Lviv. Torosowicz was named knight of the Order of St. Michael and the Order of Jesus and Mary.

He died on October 24, 1681, at the age of 76.

== See also ==
- Armenian Catholic Archeparchy of Lviv,
- Armenian Catholic Church

== Bibliography ==
- Samuel Orgelbrand, ed. (1867). Encyklopedia Powszechna (1st edition) (in Polish) 25. pp. 388–390.
- Sadok Barącz, Żywoty sławnych Ormian w Polsce (in Polish), Lvov, 1856.
