= Leon Malyi =

Ukrainian Roman Catholic prelate

- Titular Bishop of Tabunia, Auxiliary Bishop of Roman Catholic Archdiocese of Lviv
- Church: Roman Catholic Church
- Appointed: 4 May 2002
- Other post: Prefect in the Major Theological Latin Seminary in Lviv (2000–2002)

Orders
- Ordination: 7 June 1984 (Priest) by Jan Cienski
- Consecration: 20 June 2002 (Bishop) by Cardinal Marian Jaworski

Personal details
- Born: Leon Yanovych Malyi; 17 August 1958 (age 68) Bar, Vinnytsia Oblast, Ukrainian SSR
- Education: Pontifical University of the Holy Cross
- Coat of arms

Bishop Leon Malyi (Ukrainian: Леон Малий; Polish: Leon Mały; born 17 August 1958 in Bar, Vinnytsia Oblast, Ukrainian SSR) is a Ukrainian Roman Catholic prelate, the Titular Bishop of Tabunia and Auxiliary bishop of the Archdiocese of Lviv since 4 May 2002.

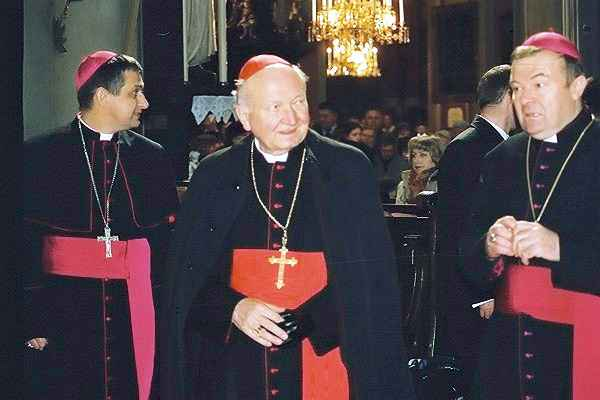
Bishop Leon Malyi (left) with Cardinal Marian Jaworski (middle) and bishop Marian Buczek (right) in 2006

== Life ==
Leon Malyi was born in the family of Yan and Henovefa (née Hutsal) Malyi in the Podolia. After graduation of the school education, continued to study at the Lviv cinema college. In the same time he joined the clandestine Roman Catholic Theological Seminary under the supervision of Father Henrik Mosing: he was ordained as priest on June 7, 1984, by clandestine Bishop Jan Cienski (single Roman Catholic bishop in the territory of Ukraine) after graduation of the theological studies.

During 1984–1990 he worked as a clandestine priest in the Podolia region and after the Dissolution of the Soviet Union began to work openly until 1995. Fr. Malyi continued to study in the Pontifical University of the Holy Cross in Rome with Doctor of Sacred Theology degree (1995–2000). He returned to Ukraine in 2000 and began to work as a Prefect in the Major Roman Catholic Theological Seminary in Lviv (2000–2002).

On May 4, 2002, he was appointed by Pope John Paul II as the second Auxiliary Bishop of the Archdiocese of Lviv, Ukraine, and Titular Bishop of Tabunia. On June 20, 2002, he was consecrated as bishop by Metropolitan Archbishop Marian Cardinal Jaworski and other prelates of the Roman Catholic Church.

Catholic Church titles
Preceded by Jerzy Mazur	Titular Bishop of Tabunia; 2002–	Succeeded by Incumbent
