= Józef Teodorowicz =

Józef Teofil Teodorowicz
- Archeparch of Lviv
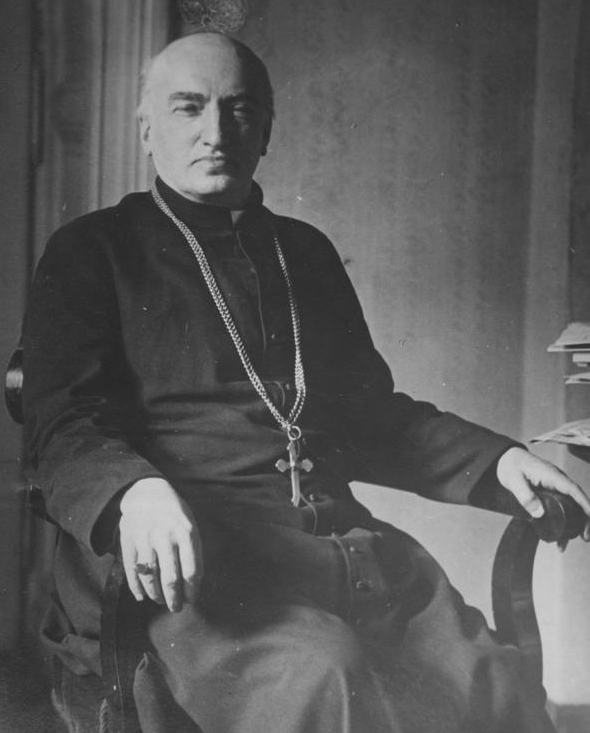
- Native name: Յովսէփ Թէոֆիլ Թէոդորովիչ
- Church: Armenian Catholic Church
- Archdiocese: Archeparchy of Lviv
- In office: 16 December 1901 – 4 December 1938
- Predecessor: Izaak Mikołaj Isakowicz
- Successor: Dionizy Kajetanowicz

Orders
- Ordination: 9 January 1887 by Izaak Mikołaj Isakowicz
- Consecration: 2 February 1902 by Jan Puzyna de Kosielsko

Personal details
- Born: 25 August 1864 Żywaczów (southeast of Olesha), Kingdom of Galicia and Lodomeria, Austrian Empire
- Died: 4 December 1938 (aged 74) Lwów, Lwów Voivodeship, Poland

Józef Teodorowicz (Armenian: Յովսէփ Թէոֆիլ Թէոդորովիչ; 25 August 1864 – 4 December 1938) was the last Armenian Catholic Archbishop of Lviv. All of his family were of Armenian origin and had lived for centuries in Poland.

Teodorowicz finished a grammar school in Stanislaviv then studied with the faculty of law at Chernivtsi University in Bukovina. During his studies he suffered a crisis of belief. A year later he enrolled in the Major Roman Catholic Theological Seminary in Lviv. In 1887 he became a priest and, after the death of Archbishop Izaak Mikołaj Isakowicz of Lviv, in 1901 was named to succeed him. He is widely respected among Poles for his religious and social work.

Teodorowicz died in Lviv, where he was buried at the Cemetery of the Defenders of Lwów. When the city was occupied by Soviet forces during World War II his remains were transferred to a family cemetery to save them from profanation. The first Soviet occupation of 1939–1941 prevented the nomination of a successor and during the subsequent occupations and destructive policies of Nazi Germany and Stalin's Soviet Union the city's 700-year-old Armenian community was completely destroyed.

In 2008, the Polish Sejm recognized him as "heroic patriot".

In 2011, his remains were transferred and reburied in the Cemetery of the Defenders of Lwów.
