= Eugeniusz Baziak =

Roman Catholic archbishop (1890–1962)

His Excellency Eugeniusz Baziak
- Archbishop of Lwów; Apostolic Administrator of Kraków
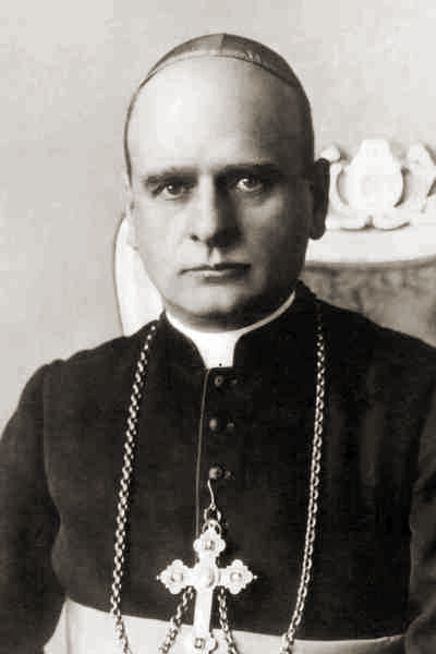
- Appointed: 22 November 1945
- Installed: 22 November 1945
- Term ended: 15 June 1962
- Predecessor: Bolesław Twardowski
- Successor: Marian Jaworski
- Previous posts: Auxiliary Bishop of Lwów (1933 - 1944); Titular Bishop of Phocaea (1933 - 1944); Coadjutor Archbishop of Lwów (1944 - 1945); Titular Archbishop of Parium (1944 - 1945); Apostolic Administrator of Kraków (1951 - 1962)

Orders
- Ordination: 14 July 1912 by Wladyslaw Bandurski
- Consecration: 5 November 1933 by Bolesław Twardowski

Personal details
- Born: Eugeniusz Baziak; 8 March 1890 Tarnopol, Austro-Hungarian Empire (now Ternopil, Ukraine)
- Died: 15 June 1962 (aged 72) Warsaw, Poland
- Denomination: Roman Catholic

Ordination history
History
Priestly ordination
- Ordained by: Władysław Bandurski
- Date: 14 July 1912
Episcopal consecration
- Principal consecrator: Bolesław Twardowski
- Co-consecrators: Franciszek Lisowski, and Edward Komar
- Date: 5 November 1933
Episcopal succession
Bishops consecrated by Eugeniusz Baziak as principal consecrator
- Karol Józef Wojtyła (Pope John Paul II): 28 September 1958
- Michał Blecharczyk: 5 October 1958
- Julian Jan Groblicki: 18 September 1960
- Jerzy Karol Ablewicz: 20 May 1962

Eugeniusz Baziak (Polish pronunciation: [ɛwˈɡɛɲuʐ ˈbaʑak]; 8 March 1890 – 15 June 1962) was Archbishop of Lwów and apostolic administrator of Kraków. Baziak was rector of the Clerical Seminarium in Lwów. From 1933 he was an auxiliary bishop and from 1944 Archbishop of Lwów. In 1951, after the death of Cardinal Adam Stefan Sapieha, he became the apostolic administrator of the archdiocese in Kraków.

In his capacity as apostolic administrator of Kraków, he recommended to Pope Pius XII the promotion of Karol Wojtyła (the future Pope John Paul II), who was then a priest in the Archdiocese of Kraków, to the office of auxiliary bishop of that archdiocese. It is said that this recommendation was made in so strong terms that the Holy See made the appointment without even consulting with the Primate of Poland, Stefan Wyszyński, as was usual. Instead, Wyszyński received notice from the Vatican that he was simply to inform Wojtyła of the appointment, and ask him for his acceptance.

After Wojtyła accepted and the appointment was formalized by the Pope, it fell to Baziak to be the principal consecrator, Bishops Kominek and Jop being co-consecrators, of Wojtyła as a bishop, the episcopal consecration occurring in September 1958. Wojtyła would eventually succeed Baziak at Kraków after Baziak's death.

== Notes ==
Catholic Church titles
Preceded by Bolesław Twardowski	Archbishop of Lwów; 1944–1962	Succeeded by Marian Jaworski
Preceded by Adam Stefan Sapieha; Archbishop of Kraków	Apostolic Administrator of the Archdiocese of Kraków; 1951–1962	Succeeded by Karol Wojtyła; Archbishop of Kraków
