= Bolesław Twardowski =

Polish Roman Catholic archbishop (1864–1944)

- Metropolitan Archbishop of Roman Catholic Archdiocese of Lviv
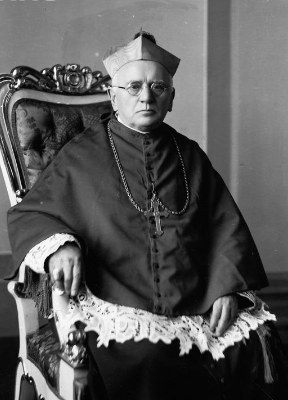
- Church: Roman Catholic Church
- Appointed: 3 August 1923
- Term ended: 22 November 1944
- Predecessor: Józef Bilczewski
- Successor: Eugeniusz Baziak
- Other posts: Auxiliary Bishop of Lviv and Titular Bishop of Telmessos (1918–1923)

Orders
- Ordination: 25 July 1886 (Priest) by Seweryn Morawski
- Consecration: 12 January 1919 (Bishop) by St. Józef Bilczewski

Personal details
- Born: Bolesław Twardowski; 18 February 1864 Lviv, Austrian Empire
- Died: 22 November 1944 (aged 80) Lviv, Ukrainian SSR

Archbishop Bolesław Twardowski (Ukrainian: Болеслав Твардовський; Polish: Bolesław Twardowski; 18 February 1864 – 22 November 1944) was a Roman Catholic prelate, who served as an Auxiliary Bishop of the Roman Catholic Archdiocese of Lviv and a Titular Bishop of Telmessos from 14 September 1918 until 3 August 1923 and as the Metropolitan Archbishop of the same Archdiocese from 3 August 1923 until his death on 22 November 1944.

== Life ==
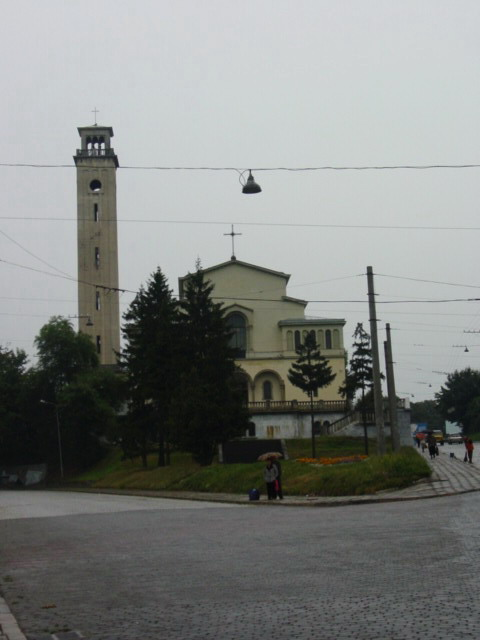
Greek-Catholic church of the Protection of the Mather of God (former Roman Catholic church of Our Lady of the Gate of Dawn) in Lviv, the original place of Archbishop's Bolesław Twardowski burial

Archbishop Twardowski was born in the intelligent Polish Roman Catholic family in Lviv. After graduation of the school education, he subsequently joined Faculty of Theology of the University of Lviv and the Major Roman Catholic Theological Seminary in Lviv in 1882 and was ordained as priest on July 25, 1886, for the Roman Catholic Archdiocese of Lviv by Archbishop Seweryn Morawski, when completed of the philosophical and theological studies. After that he continued to study in the Pontifical Gregorian University in Rome, obtaining a Doctor of Canon Law degree.

After returning from Italy, he served as a prefect in Major Roman Catholic Theological Seminary in Lviv and later was appointed as a chancellor of the Metropolitan curia. In 1902 he became a parish priest in Ternopil and constructed there the Church of St. Mary of the Perpetual Assistance during 1903–1908. He remained here as dean and canon until 1918.

On September 14, 1918, he was appointed by the Pope Benedict XV as an Auxiliary Bishop of the Roman Catholic Archdiocese of Lviv and a Titular Bishop of Telmessos. On January 12, 1919, he was consecrated as bishop by Metropolitan Archbishop Józef Bilczewski and other prelates of the Roman Catholic Church in the Cathedral Basilica of the Assumption, Lviv. In the same time he was nominated as a Vicar General of the Archdiocese and a Rector of the Major Latin Theological Seminary.

In March 1923, with the death of Metropolitan Józef Bilczewski, he became a Vicar capitular of the Archdiocese and on August 3, 1923, was appointed by the Holy See as a Metropolitan Archbishop.

Archbishop Twardowski died, while in the office, on November 22, 1944, and was buried in the Roman Catholic church of Our Lady of the Gate of Dawn in Lviv, accordingly with his will.

He was a cousin of the Polish philosopher Kazimierz Twardowski, Rector of the University of Lviv.

Catholic Church titles
| Preceded by Johannes Anton Hoffmann | Titular Bishop of Telmessos; 1918–1923 | Succeeded by Jean-Camille Costes |
| Preceded by Józef Bilczewski | Metropolitan Archbishop of Roman Catholic Archdiocese of Lviv; 1923–1944 | Succeeded by Eugeniusz Baziak |
