= Albin Dunajewski =

Catholic cardinal (1817–1894)

His Eminence Albin Dunajewski
- Cardinal, Bishop of Kraków
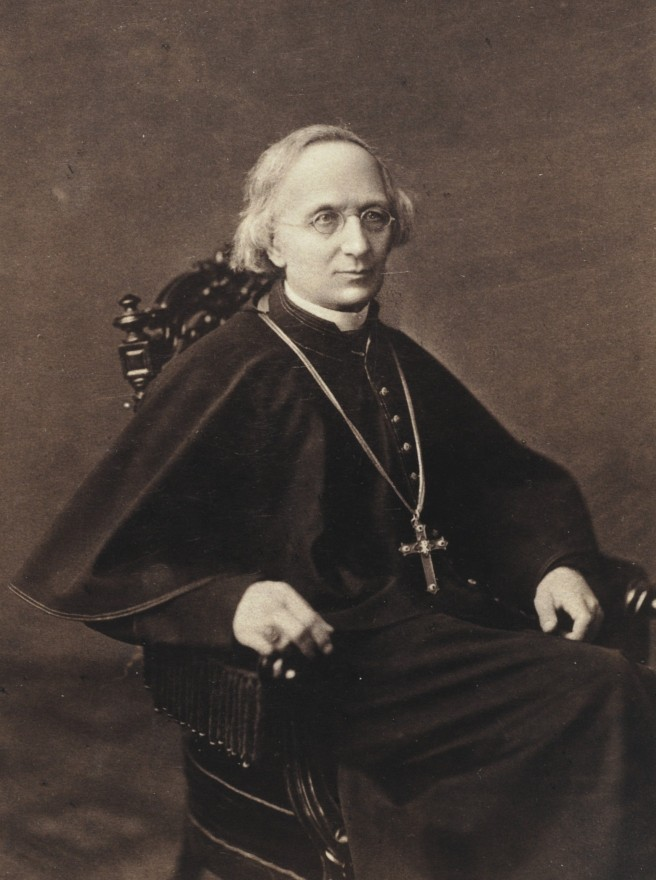
- Church: Roman Catholic
- Archdiocese: Roman Catholic Archdiocese of Kraków
- Metropolis: Kraków
- Installed: 1879
- Term ended: 18 June 1894
- Predecessor: Karol Skórkowski
- Successor: Jan Puzyna de Kosielsko
- Other posts: Cardinal-Priest of Santi Vitale, Valeria, Gervasio e Protasio

Orders
- Ordination: 28 July 1861
- Consecration: 18 June 1879
- Created cardinal: 23 June 1890 by Leo XIII
- Rank: Cardinal-Priest

Personal details
- Born: 1 March 1817 Stanisławów, Austrian Empire (Present day Ukraine)
- Died: 18 June 1894 (aged 77) Kraków, Austria-Hungary
- Buried: Wawel Cathedral
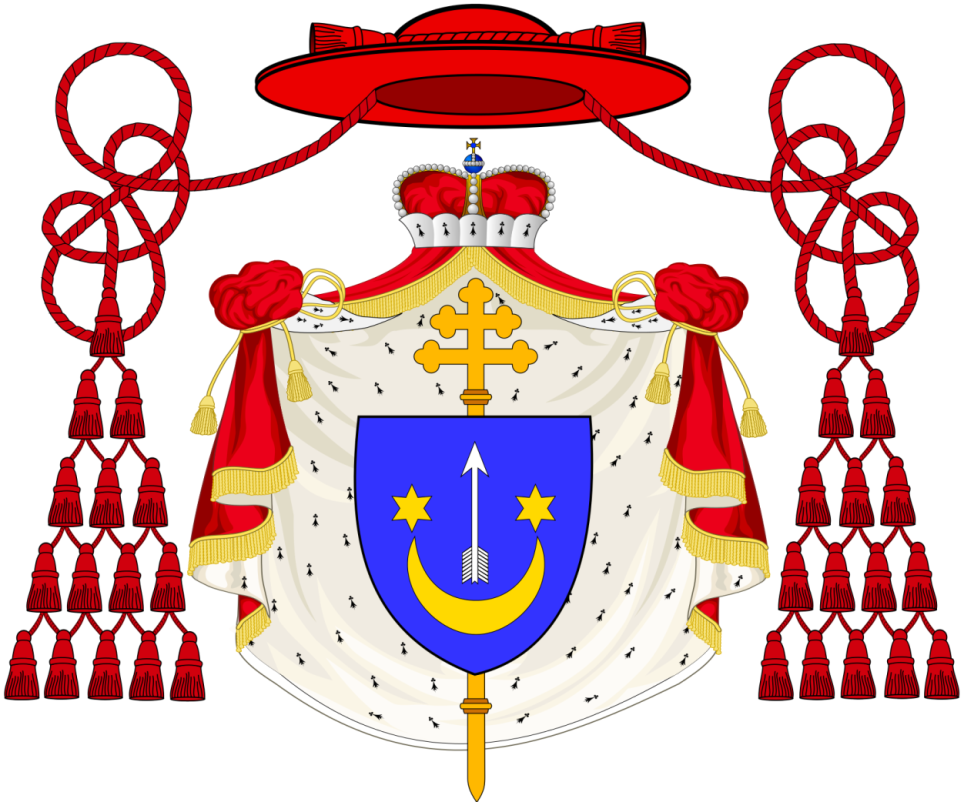
- Coat of arms

Albin Dunajewski (born 1 March 1817 in Stanisławów - 19 June 1894 in Kraków) was a Bishop of Kraków, Poland, as well as charitable patron and high-profile social activist.

== Highlights ==
In 1882, Albin Dunajewski ordained Brother Raphael Kalinowski as Priest of the Discalced Carmelite Order. Father Raphael was canonized in 1991, by Pope John Paul II. In 1892, Cardinal Dunajewski (elevated to that rank in 1890) laid the corner-stone for the construction of the Church of the Holy Virgin Mary of Lourdes founded by the Lazarists in the district of Krowodrza, but died two years later, just before its consecration in 1894.

== See also ==
- Archbishop of Kraków (with complete list)

== Notes and references ==
| Preceded by Karol Skórkowski | Bishop of Kraków; 1879–1894 | Succeeded by Jan Puzyna de Kosielsko |
