= Majdan Lipowiecki =

- Village
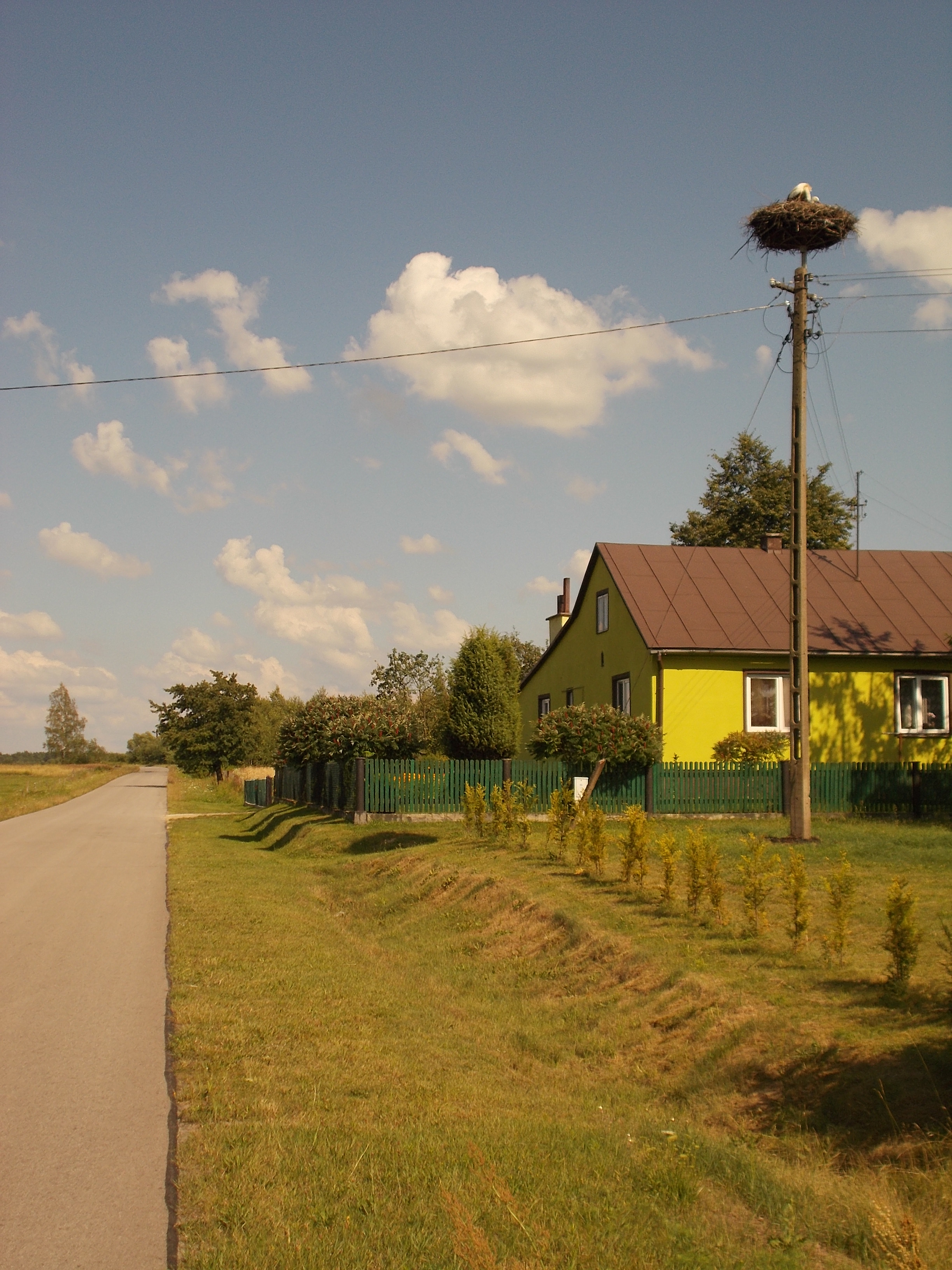
- Interactive map of Majdan Lipowiecki
- Location within Poland
- Coordinates: 50°4′N 23°10′E
- Country: Poland
- Voivodeship: Subcarpathian
- County: Lubaczów
- Gmina: Wielkie Oczy

Majdan Lipowiecki (Polish pronunciation: [ˈmajdan lipɔˈvɛtskʲi]) is a village in the administrative district of Gmina Wielkie Oczy, within Lubaczów County, Subcarpathian Voivodeship, in south-eastern Poland, close to the border with Ukraine.
