= Cathedral Basilica of the Assumption, Lviv =

Latin Catholic church in Lviv, Ukraine

Latin Cathedral
- Archcathedral Basilica of the Assumption of the Blessed Virgin Mary
- Латинський собор
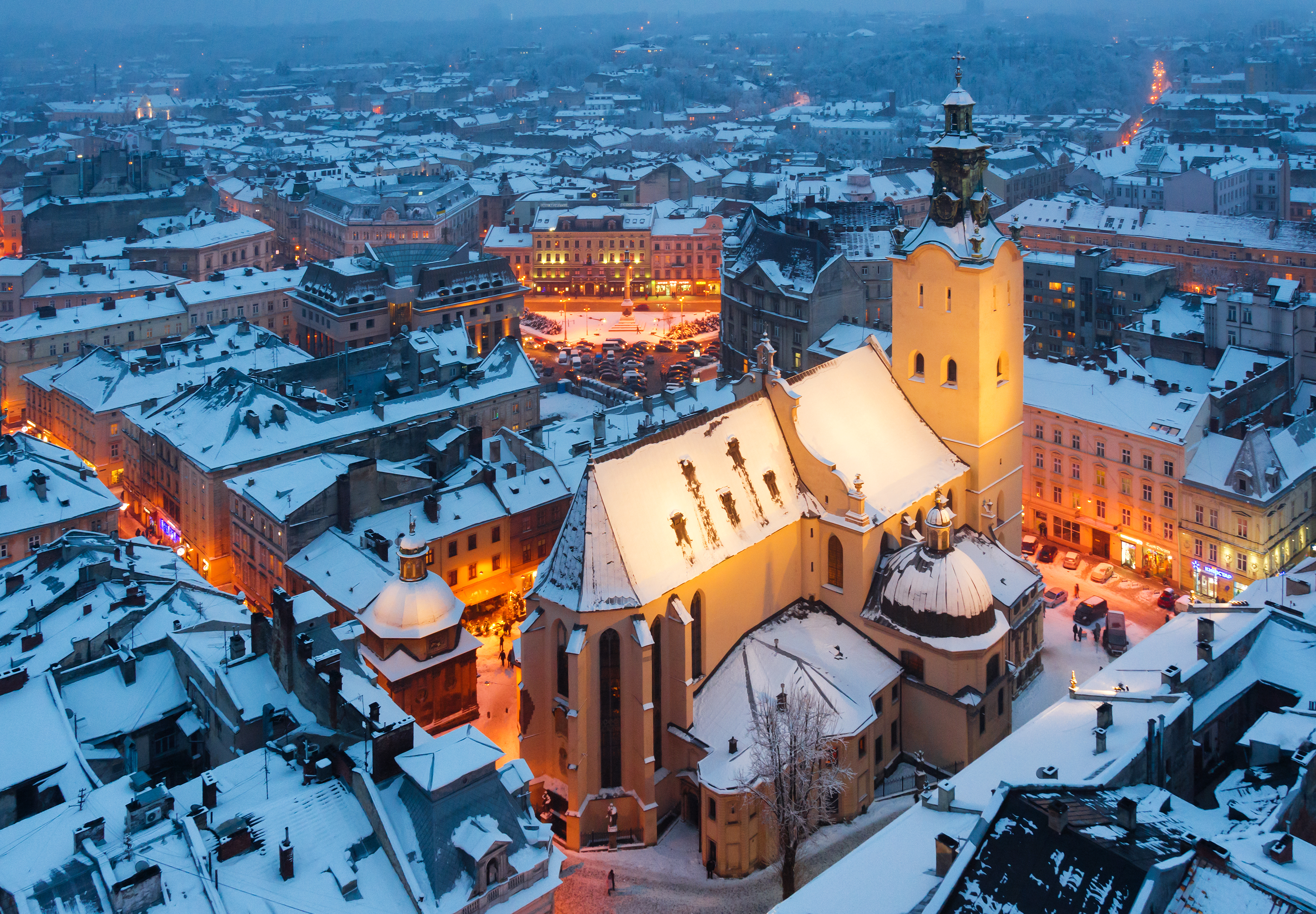
- The cathedral seen from the town hall (January 2017)
- Latin Cathedral
- 49°50′27″N 24°01′50″E
- Location: Lviv
- Country: Ukraine
- Denomination: Catholic
- Sui iuris church: Latin Church

History
- Status: Active
- Founded: 1360
- Founder: Casimir III the Great
- Dedication: Assumption of Mary
- Consecrated: 1405

Architecture
- Functional status: Metropolitan Cathedral
- Style: Gothic

Administration
- Archdiocese: Lviv

Clergy
- Archbishop: Mieczysław Mokrzycki

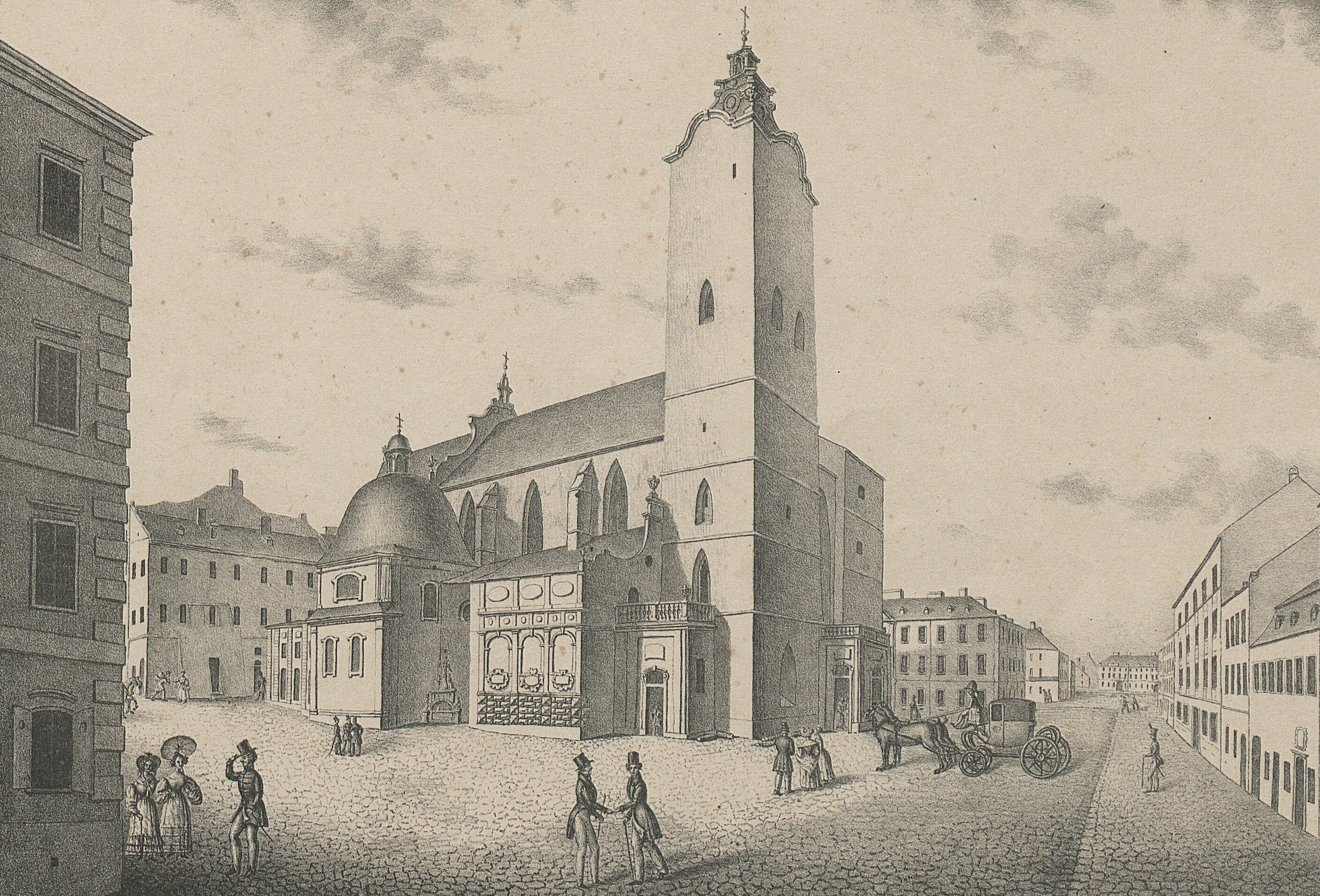
The church circa 1840

The Archcathedral Basilica of the Assumption of the Blessed Virgin Mary (Ukrainian: Архикатедральна Базиліка Пресвятої Діви Марії, romanized: Arkhykatedralna Bazylika Presviatoi Divy Marii; Polish: Bazylika Archikateldralna Najświętszej Maryi Panny), usually called simply the Latin Cathedral (Ukrainian: Латинський собор, romanized: Latynskyi sobor; Polish: Katedra Łacińska) is a 14th-century Latin Catholic cathedral in Lviv, western Ukraine. It is located in the city's Old Town, in the south western corner of the market square, called Cathedral Square.

== History ==
The first church built on this site was a small wooden Latin Catholic church dedicated to the Holy Trinity, built in 1344 and lost in a fire six years later. In 1360, Casimir III the Great, the King of Poland and of Ruthenia began the construction of the current church in Gothic style, intended to be the cathedral of the newly created See of Lwów. The church was consecrated in 1405, and the parish was moved here from the Church of Our Lady of the Snow, Lviv. In 1412, the Latin See was transferred from Halych. Construction work continued throughout the 15th century, and the cathedral was finally consecrated in 1481.

The cathedral witnessed many significant events. In 1440, the Metropolitan of Kyiv, Cardinal Isidore of Kyiv celebrated a Holy Mass for Christian unity when he stopped in Lwów on his way back from the Council of Florence. It was visited by several Polish kings, most notably by John II Casimir Vasa, who entrusted the Polish–Lithuanian Commonwealth to the care of Mary, mother of Jesus in the Lwów Oath.

Between 1761 and 1776, the cathedral was rebuilt in the Baroque style and a tall bell tower was added. The works were led by architect Piotr Polejowski and sculptors Johann Georg Pinsel and Maciej Polejowski, under the commission of Archbishop Wacław Hieronim Sierakowski. In 1776 the 16th-century miraculous icon of the Our Lady of Grace, painted by Józef Szolc-Wolfowicz, held in the cathedral was crowned and placed in the main altar. In 1892–1898, the presbytery was remodelled in Gothic Revival style and stained glass, designed by Józef Mehoffer and Jan Matejko, were installed. In 1910, the cathedral was granted the status of a minor basilica by Pope Pius X.

Following the Soviet annexation of almost half of Poland's pre-war territory, the Catholic Cathedral is presently one of just two churches in Lviv that were not closed down or made subject to the Russian Orthodox Church during Soviet rule, the other being the Saint Anthony of Padua church, Lviv in Lychakiv (now Lychakivskyi District). The deported bishops of the Catholic See resided in Lubaczów, a town now in southeastern Poland close to the border of Ukraine. In 1991, Pope John Paul II reactivated the Lviv diocese.

The miraculous icon of the Madonna was moved to Kraków after World War II, and then in 1974 to the co-cathedral in Lubaczów. In 1983, it was once again crowned in Jasna Góra Monastery and remains presently in Lubaczów. Lviv Cathedral owns a copy that Pope John Paul II crowned during his apostolic visit to Ukraine on June 26, 2001.

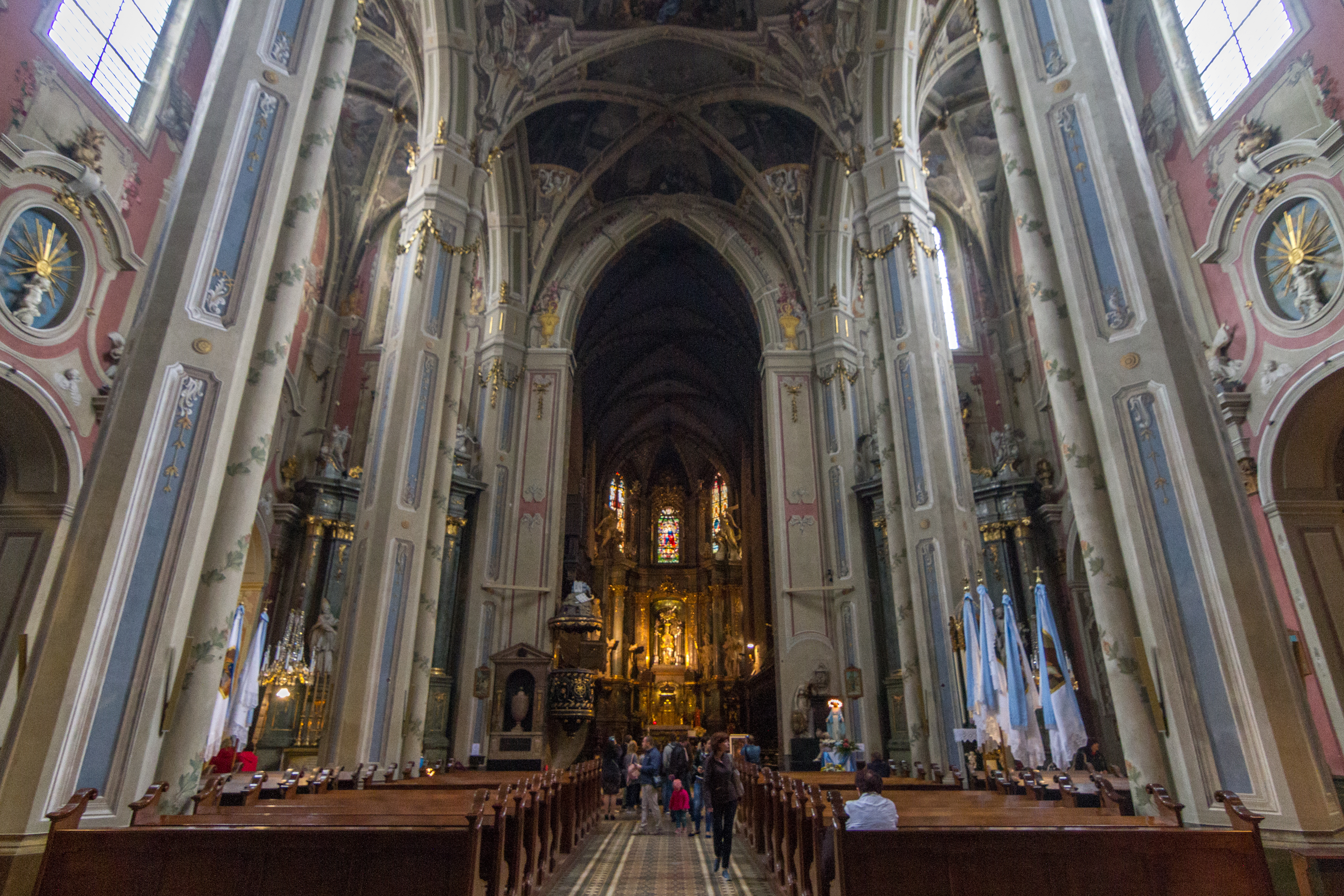
Interior of the cathedral

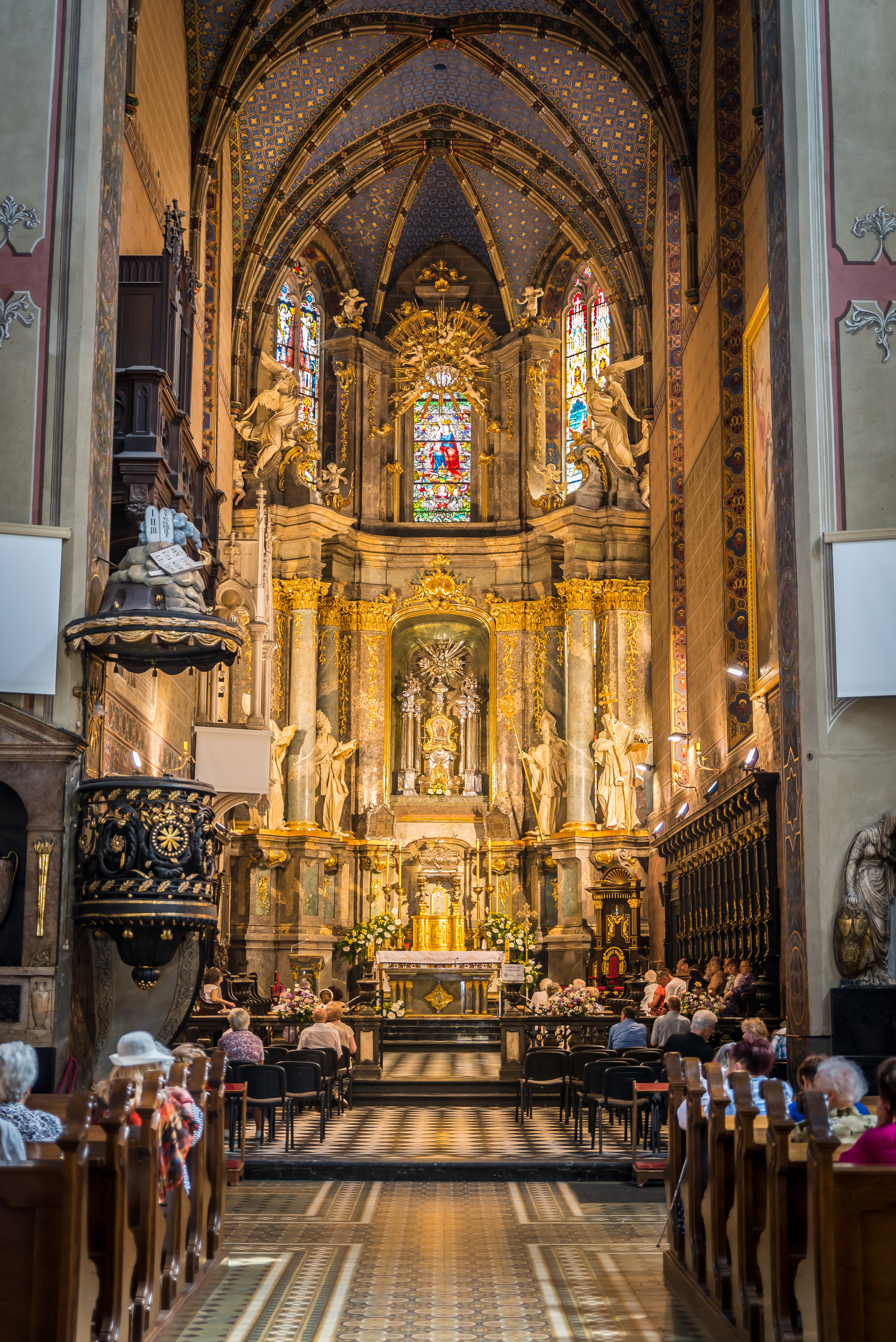
Main altar

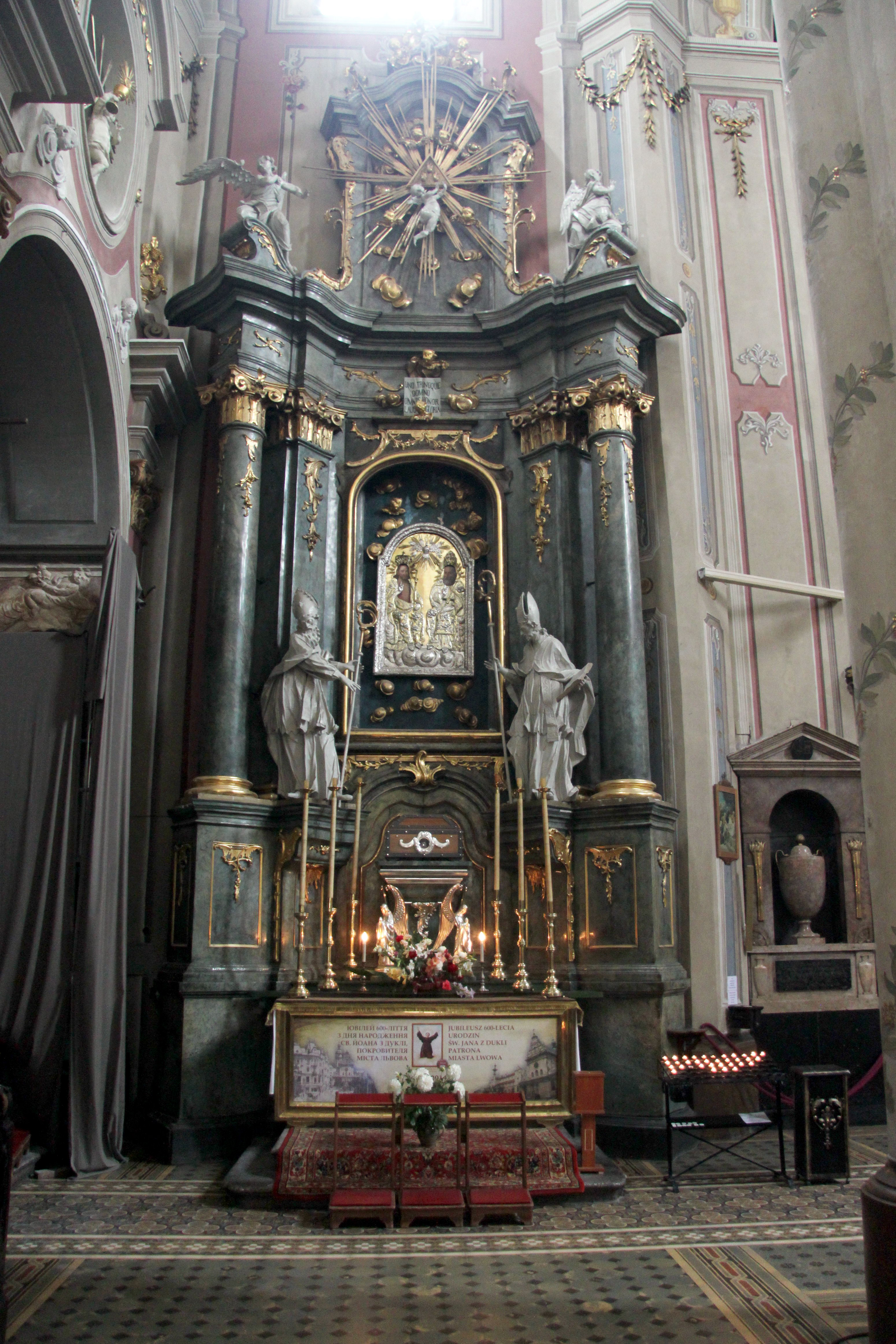
Altar of the Holy Trinity

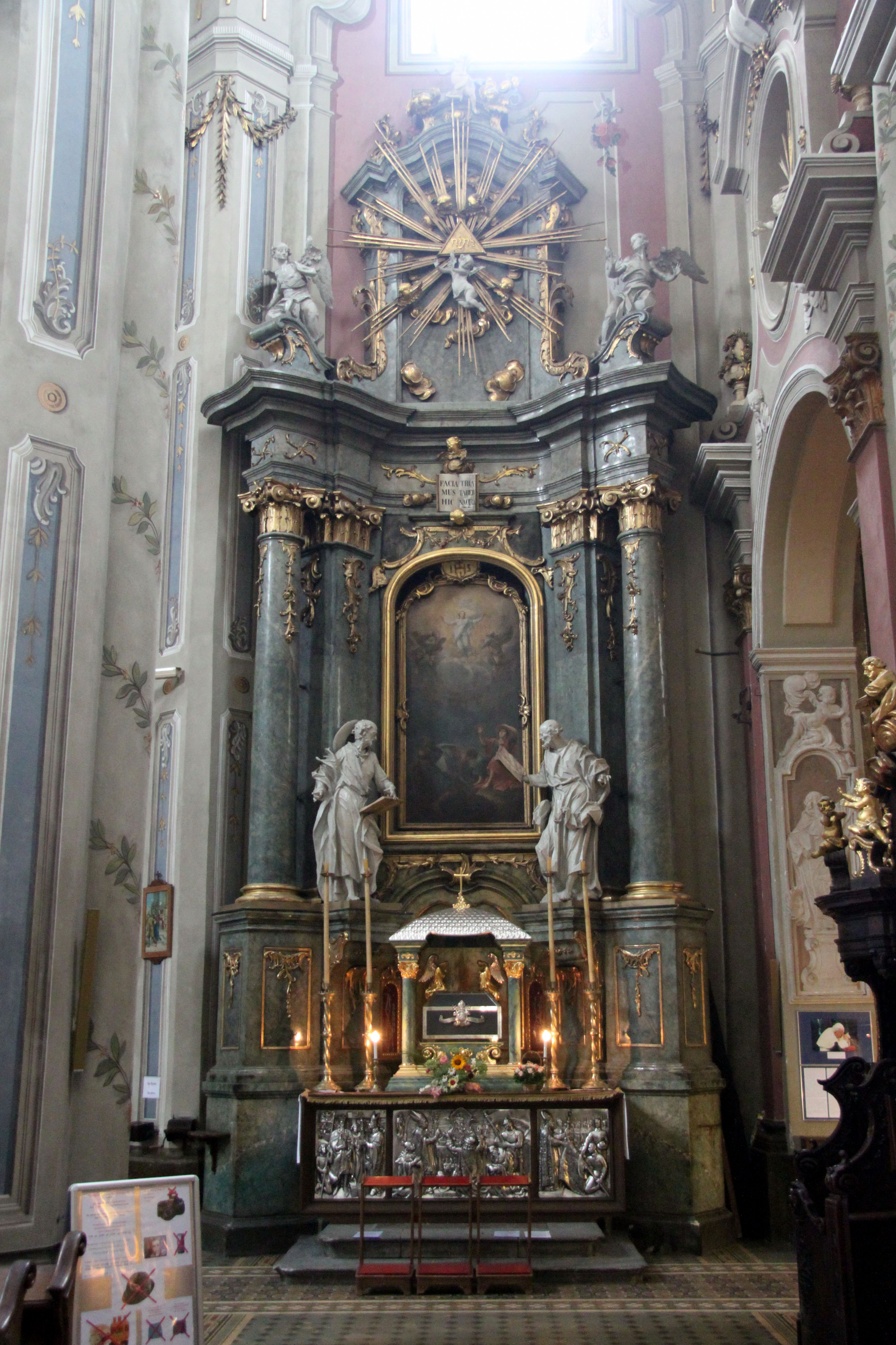
Altar of the Transfiguration of Jesus

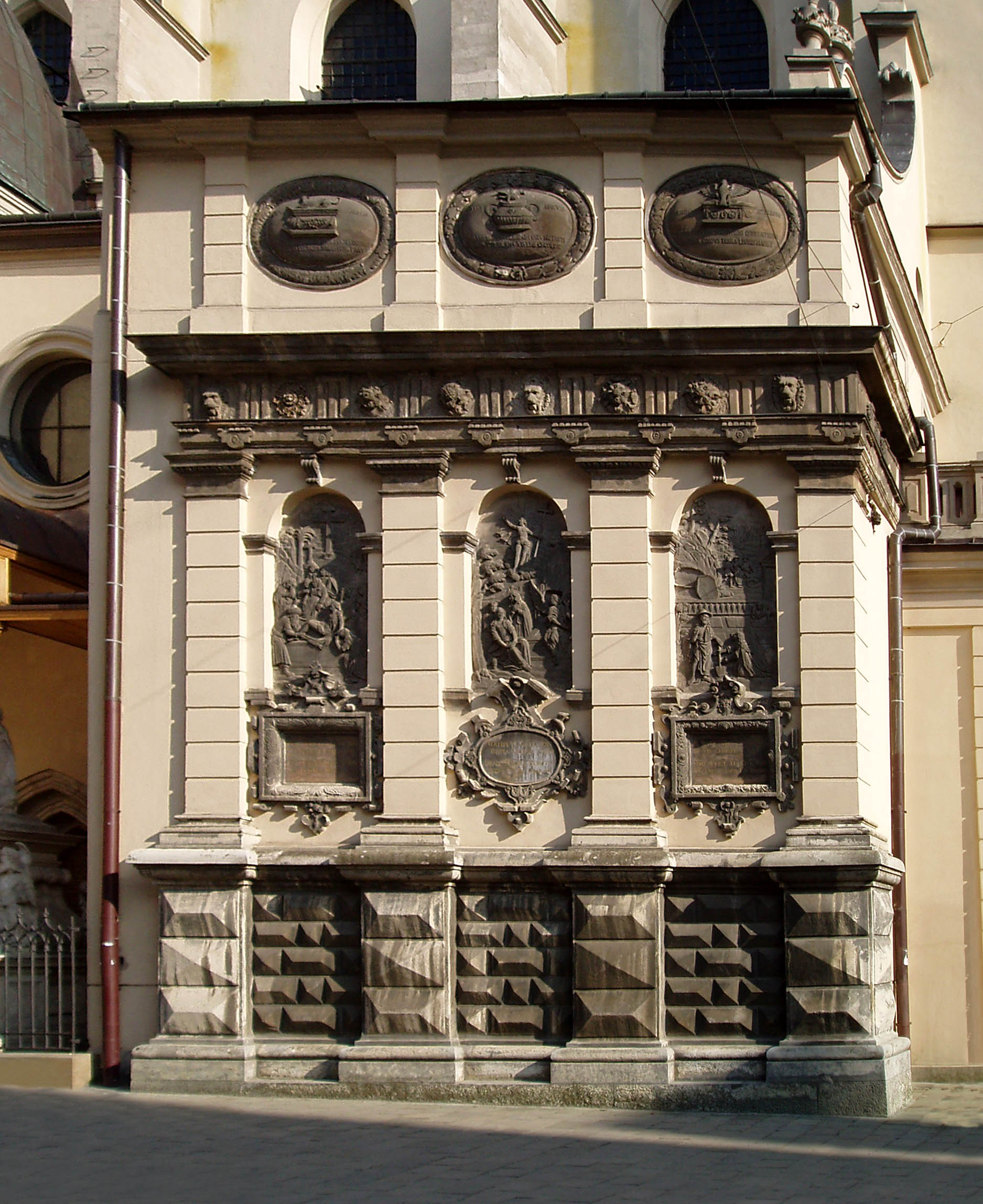
Kampian's Chapel

== See also ==
- Catholic Church in Ukraine
