= Marian Jaworski =

Catholic cardinal (1926–2020)

His Eminence Marian Jaworski
- Archbishop Emeritus of Lviv of the Latins
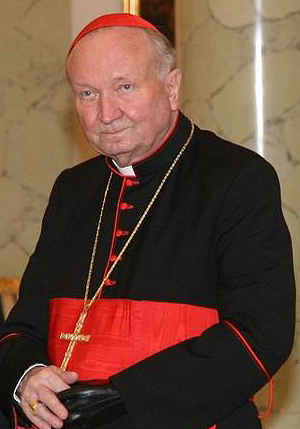
- Cardinal Marian Jaworski
- Diocese: Lviv
- See: Lviv
- Installed: 16 January 1991
- Term ended: 21 October 2008
- Predecessor: Eugeniusz Baziak
- Successor: Mieczysław Mokrzycki
- Other post: Cardinal-Priest of San Sisto
- Previous posts: Apostolic Administrator of Lviv (1984–91); Titular Bishop of Lambaesis (1984–91)

Orders
- Ordination: 25 June 1950 by Eugeniusz Baziak
- Consecration: 23 June 1984 by Franciszek Macharski
- Created cardinal: 21 February 1998 by John Paul II
- Rank: Cardinal-Priest

Personal details
- Born: Marian Franciszek Jaworski; 21 August 1926 Lwów, Second Polish Republic
- Died: 5 September 2020 (aged 94) Kraków, Poland
- Denomination: Roman Catholic
- Motto: Mihi vivere Christus est (English: To me life is Christ)
- Coat of arms

Styles of Marian Jaworski
- Reference style: His Eminence
- Spoken style: Your Eminence
- Informal style: Cardinal
- See: Lviv (emeritus)

Marian Franciszek Jaworski (Ukrainian: Мар'ян Францішек Яворський, 21 August 1926 – 5 September 2020) was a Cardinal Priest and Archbishop of Lviv of the Latins in the Roman Catholic Church. He was a close friend of Pope John Paul II.

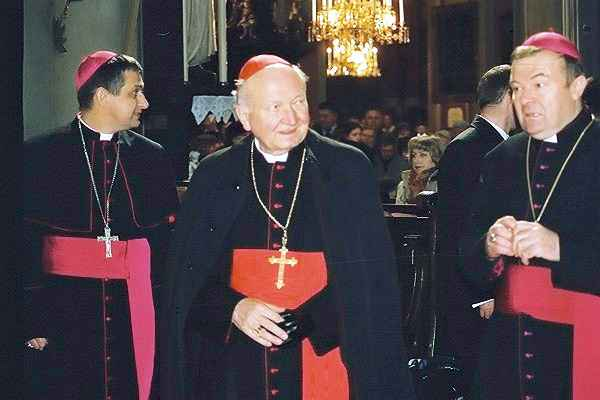
Jaworski (middle) with bishops from Lviv: Leon Malyi (left) and Marian Buczek (right) in 2006

== Biography ==
=== Early years ===
Born the son of Wincenty and Stanisława Łastowiecka in Lwów, Poland (now Lviv, Ukraine), his family was expelled from Ukraine in 1945 when the Soviets directed a "repatriation drive" for Poles living within the former borders of Poland in the entire Kresy region. Jaworski began his studies in Poland at the Lwów Major Seminary and was ordained in Kraków on 25 June 1950. He served as a priest for two years (1950–1952) at a parish near the Ukrainian border before returning to the Jagiellonian University to complete a Doctorate in Philosophy. He had three doctorates by 1965 – one in theology from the Jagiellonian University, and Ph.D.s from the Lublin Catholic University and Warsaw Theological Academy.

=== Later career ===
Jaworski was a professor for several years at the Warsaw Theological Academy and later at the Pontifical Theological Faculty of Kraków. He also lectured in metaphysics and the philosophy of religion at the seminaries of various religious orders. From 1981 to 1987 he was the first rector of the Pontifical Theological Academy of Kraków. He lived near Karol Wojtyla at that time. When Wojtyla was appointed archbishop of the Krakow Archdiocese in 1964, Jaworski was given an apartment in the archbishop's residence. In 1970, he was made secretary of the Polish Bishops' Scientific Council, a role he held until 1984. Jaworski was Dean of the Pontifical Theological Faculty in Kraków from 1976 to 1981.

=== Episcopacy ===
On 21 May 1984, Pope John Paul II appointed Jaworski the titular bishop of Lambaesis and apostolic administrator of Lubaczów, receiving episcopal ordination on 23 June 1984. At the time, Pope John Paul II was not able to appoint a new archbishop for Lviv due to Soviet interference. John Paul II asked Jaworski to be the administrator of the archdiocese temporarily from Lubaczow, Poland. Jaworski was then appointed apostolic administrator of Lviv for territories within Poland in May 1984 and was consecrated bishop on 23 June. When the Soviet Union fell, Jaworski was named Archbishop of Lviv by John Paul II on 16 January 1991. Jaworski set about rebuilding the diocese left shattered by 45 years of communist oppression. In 1992, Cardinal Jaworski was elected president of the Latin Church Bishops' conference for Ukraine.

=== Cardinalate ===
At the consistory of 21 February 1998, Jaworski was created Cardinal by John Paul II in pectore, one of four such secret cardinal appointments he made while pope; Jaworski's cardinalate was made public at the consistory of 21 February 2001. He was one of the cardinal electors who participated in the 2005 papal conclave that selected Pope Benedict XVI. He surpassed the age of 80 in 2006, losing the right to participate in future conclaves. In October 2008, Pope Benedict XVI accepted his resignation as archbishop.

=== Death ===
Cardinal Jaworski died two weeks after his 94th birthday in 2020. In his condolence letter, Pope Francis recalled Jaworkski's deep friendship with John Paul II, and his close collaboration, as a theologian and philosopher, with Pope Benedict XVI. For his part, Pope Francis said that Jaworski’s cardinalate was announced in 2001, at the same consistory where he, at the time, Archbishop Jorge Bergoglio, was also created a Cardinal.

== Publications ==
- The Philosophy of Person: Solidarity and Cultural Creativity, Council for Research in Values and Philosophy, Series IVA, Vol. 1 (2005).

Catholic Church titles
Preceded by John Joseph Paul	Titular Bishop of Lambaesis; 21 May 1984 – 16 January 1991	Succeeded by Michel Pierre Marie Mouïsse
Preceded by Marian Jozef Rechowicz	Apostolic Administrator of Lviv; 21 May 1984 – 16 January 1991	Promoted to archbishop
Preceded by Eugeniusz Baziak	Archbishop of Lviv; 16 January 1991 – 21 October 2008	Succeeded by Mieczysław Mokrzycki
Preceded by Ignatius Kung Pin-Mei	Cardinal-Priest of San Sisto; 21 February 2001 – 5 September 2020	Succeeded by Antoine Kambanda
