= Armenian Catholic Archeparchy of Lviv =

Eastern Catholic ecclesiastical jurisdiction in Ukraine (1630–1944)

Coordinates: 49.8433°N 24.0308°E

The Armenian Catholic Archeparchy of Lviv is a former, non-Metropolitan archeparchy (Eastern Catholic archdiocese) of the Armenian Catholic Church sui iuris (Armenian Rite). It existed in 1630 to 1944.

It is immediately dependent on the Armenian Catholic Patriarch of Cilicia, not part of his or any ecclesiastical province, and in Rome under the Congregation for the Oriental Churches.

Its former cathedral archiepiscopal see and a minor landmark of World Heritage, the Armenian Cathedral of the Assumption of Mary in Lviv has been turned into an Armenian Apostolic Church.

== History ==
Established in 1630 as Archeparchy (Archdiocese) of Lviv (Curiate Italian Leopoli), on territory previously without Ordinary of the particular church sui iuris.

Vacant since World War II. Therefore, its faithful are "also" pastorally served by the Armenian Catholic Ordinariate of Eastern Europe.

== Episcopal ordinaries ==
(all Armenian Rite)

Archeparchs (Archbishops) of Lviv

- Mikołaj Torosowicz (24 Oct 1630 – 1681)
- Wartan Hunanian (24 Oct 1681 – 15 Jun 1715), succeeded as former Titular Bishop of Hamatha (28 Jan 1675 – 24 Oct 1681) & Coadjutor Archeparch of Lviv of the Armenians (28 Jan 1675 – 24 Oct 1681)
  - Coadjutor Archeparch Deodat Bogdan Nersesowicz (18 Jul 1701 – 1709), Titular Archbishop of Traianopolis (18 Jul 1701 – 1709)
- Jan Tobiasz Augustynowicz (1715 – 22 Dec 1751), succeeded as former Titular Archbishop of Ægeæ (11 Feb 1737 – 22 Dec 1751) & Coadjutor of Lviv of the Armenians (11 Feb 1737 – 22 Dec 1751
- Jakub Walerian Tumanowicz (11 Jan 1783 – 2 Sep 1798), succeeded as former Titular Archbishop of Camachus (16 Dec 1771 – 11 Jan 1783) & Coadjutor Archbishop of Lviv of the Armenians ([1 Jun 1771] 16 Dec 1771 – 11 Jan 1783)
- Jan Jakub Szymonowicz (1 Mar 1800 – 3 Oct 1816)
- Kajetan Augustyn Warteresiewicz (27 Jul 1817 – 6 Feb 1831)
- Samuel Cyryl Stefanowicz (24 Feb 1832 – 8 Dec 1858)
- Grzegorz Michał Szymonowicz (8 Dec 1858 – Jun 1875), succeeded as former Titular Archbishop of Marcopolis (19 Mar 1857 – 5 Jul 1857) & Coadjutor of Lviv of the Armenians (19 Mar 1857 – 8 Dec 1858)
- Grzegorz Józef Romaszkan (3 Apr 1876 – 14 Dec 1881)
- Izaak Mikołaj Isakowicz (3 Jul 1882 – 29 Apr 1901)
- Józef Teodorowicz (16 Dec 1901 – 5 Dec 1938)
- Apostolic Administrator Father Dionizy Kajetanowicz (1938 – 1944), no other office

== See also ==
- Catholic Church in Ukraine
