= Roman Catholic Archdiocese of Lviv =

Latin Catholic archdiocese in Ukraine

Coordinates: 49°50′27″N 24°01′50″E

Archdiocese of Lviv of the Latins Archidioecesis Leopolitana Latinorum Львівська архідієцезія

Catholic
- Cathedral Basilica of the Assumption, Lviv

Location
- Country: Ukraine
- Ecclesiastical province: Lviv

Statistics
- Area: 68,000 km^{2} (26,000 sq mi)
- Population: Total; Catholics: (as of 2013); 4,499,000; 138,000 (3.1%)

Information
- Denomination: Catholic Church
- Sui iuris church: Latin Church
- Rite: Roman Rite
- Cathedral: Митрополича базиліка-санктуарій Успіння Пресвятої Діви Марії (Metropolitan Cathedral Basilica of the Assumption of the Blessed Virgin Mary)

Current leadership
- Pope: Leo XIV
- Archbishop: Mieczysław Mokrzycki
- Auxiliary Bishops: Leon Malyi

Map
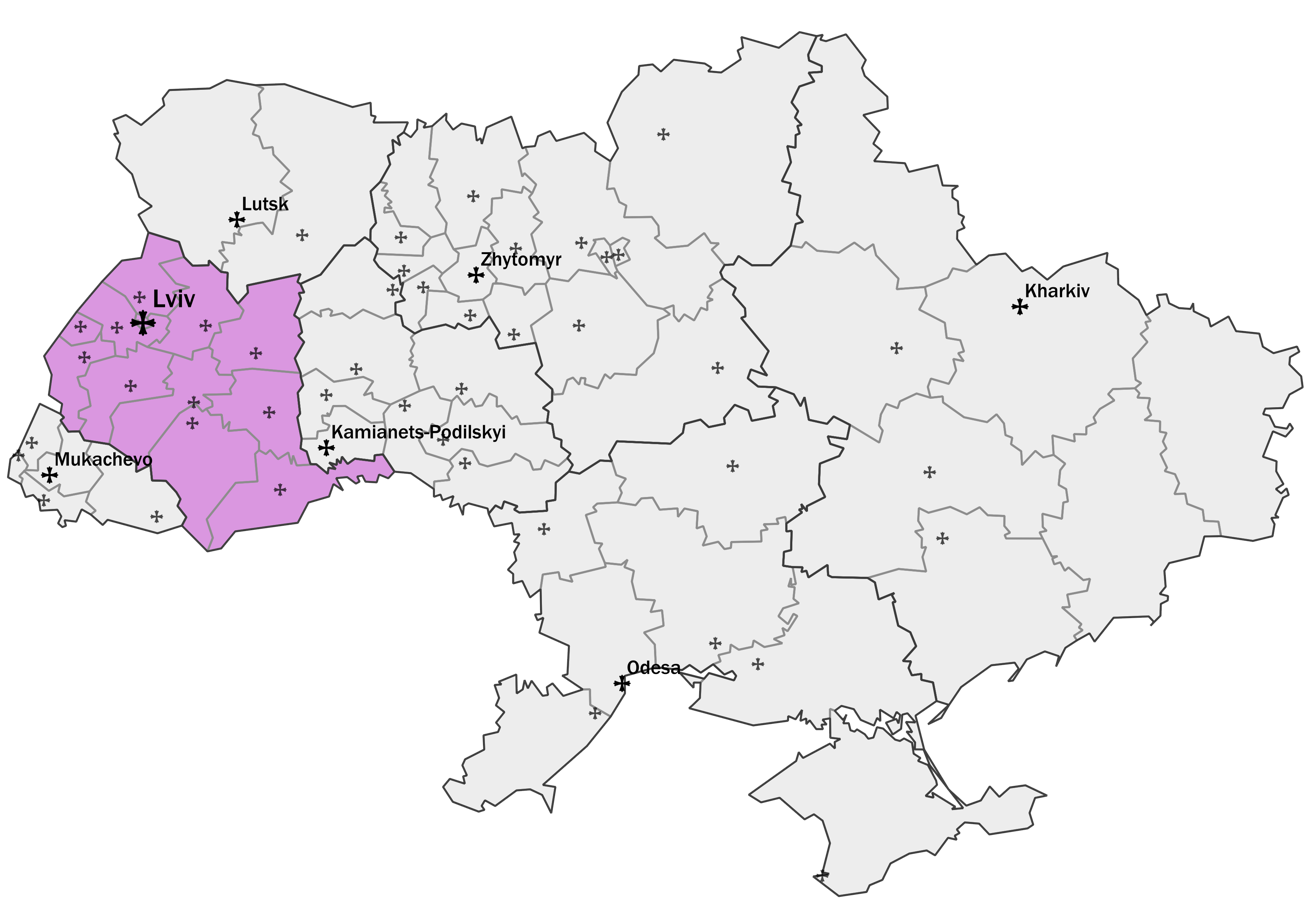
- Location of the Archdiocese of Lviv

Website
- website

The Archdiocese of Lviv (of the Latins) (Latin: Archidioecesis Leopolitana Latinorum, Ukrainian: Львівська архідієцезія, romanized: lvivska arkhidiyetseziya) is a Latin Church ecclesiastical circumscription of the Catholic Church in western Ukraine.

Its cathedral is a minor basilica and (minor) World Heritage Site: Metropolitan Cathedral Basilica of the Assumption of the Blessed Virgin Mary, in Lviv (Львів), Lviv Oblast. The diocese has a second Minor Basilica: Basilica of the Exaltation of the Holy Cross, in Chernivtsi (Чернівці), Chernivtsi Oblast.

Archbishop Mieczyslaw Mokrzycki is the current metropolitan archbishop of the archdiocese. In Kyiv exists Apostolic Nunciature to Ukraine since 1992.

== History ==
Coat of arms of the Roman Catholic Archdiocese of Lviv

The diocese was canonically erected in 1358 (or 1375) as Diocese of Lviv / Lwow / Leopoli (Italian) / Leopolitan(us) Latinorum (Latin adjective)

- Promoted on August 28, 1412 by Pope Gregory XII as Metropolitan Archdiocese of Lviv / Lwow / Leopoli (Curiate Italian) / Leopolitan(us) Latinorum (Latin), having gained territory from the suppressed Metropolitan Archdiocese of Halyč (in Slavic Galicia)
- Lost territory on 1930.06.05 to Diocese of Iaşi (Romania)
- Gained territory in 1945 from Diocese of Przemyśl (Poland, now Metropolitan)
- Lost territory in 1991 to establish the Apostolic Administration of Lubaczów.
- Pope John Paul II visited the archdiocese as part of his papal visit to Ukraine in June 2001. This included a Papal Address to the young people in Lviv.

== Statistics ==
As per 2014, it pastorally served 138,500 Roman Catholics (3.1% of 4,500,000 total) on 68,000 km² in 278 parishes with 196 priests (140 diocesan, 56 religious), 215 lay religious (76 brothers, 139 sisters) and 32 seminarians.

As of 16 July 2007 there were 138 priests, 1 permanent deacon and 213 religious in the archdiocese.

As per 2014: 12 deaneries, the area of 68,000 km², 286 parishes.

== Ecclesiastical province ==
The archdiocese is a metropolitan see with six Latin suffragan sees in its ecclesiastical province:

- Diocese of Kamyanets-Podilskyi
- Diocese of Kharkiv-Zaporizhzhia
- Diocese of Kyiv-Zhytomyr
- Diocese of Lutsk
- Diocese of Mukacheve
- Diocese of Odesa-Simferopol.

== Structure ==
- Chernivtsi Oblast: Deanery of Chernivtsi
- Ivano-Frankivsk Oblast: Deaneries of Halych and Ivano-Frankivsk
- Ternopil Oblast: Deanery of Ternopil and Chortkiv
- Lviv Oblast: Deaneries of Horodok, Lviv, Mostyska, Sambir, Stryi, Zolochiv, Zhovkva

And also Seminary in Briukhovychi.

== Episcopal ordinaries ==
Suffragan Bishops of Lviv

- Konrad (? – ?)
  - ? 1375–1380 Maciej
  - ? 1384–1390 Bernard
  - ? 1391–1409 blessed Jakub Strzemię (Jakub Strepa)
  - ? 1410–1412 Mikołaj Trąba
- Jerzy Eberhardi, Friars Minor (O.F.M.) (1390.03.16 – ?)
- Herman Wytkind, Dominican Order (O.P.) (1401.01.07 – ?)

Metropolitan Archbishops of Lviv

- Jan Rzeszowski (1414.12.23 – death 1436.08.12), previously (last) Metropolitan Archbishop of merged-in Roman Catholic Archdiocese of Halyč (Galicia, Ukraine) (1412.08.26 – 1414.12.23)
- ...
- ...
  - Coadjutor Archbishop: Ferdynand Onufry Kicki (1778.09.28 – 1780.10.25)
- ...
- Andrzej Alojzy Ankwicz (25 March 1815 - 30 Sep 1833), next metropolitan Archbishop of Praha (Prague)
- Franz Xaver Luschin (18 March 1834 - 9 Jan 1835), next Archbishop of Gorizia e Gradisca
- St. Józef Bilczewski (17 Dec 1900 - death 30 March 1923)
- Boleslaw Twardowski (3 August 1923 - death 22 Nov 1945)
- Eugeniusz Baziak (22 Nov 1945 - death 15 June 1962)
- Marian Jaworski (16 Jan 1990 - Retired 21 Oct 2008)
- Mieczysław Mokrzycki (21 Oct 2008 - ... ).

=== Auxiliaries ===
- Marian Buczek (2002.05.04 – 2007.07.16)
- Stanislaw Padewski, O.F.M. Cap. (1998 – 2002.05.04)
- Markijan Trofimiak (1991.01.16 – 1998.03.25)
- Rafal Kiernicki, O.F.M. Conv. (1991.01.16 – 1995.11.23)
- Eugeniusz Baziak (later Archbishop) (1933.09.15 – 1944.03.01)
- Francis Lisowski (1928.07.20 – 1933.01.27)
- Bolesław Twardowski (later Archbishop) (1918.09.14 – 1923.08.03)
- Wladyslaw Bandurski (1906.09.26 – 1932.03.06)
- Joseph Weber, C.R. (1895.12.02 – 1906.05.26)
- Jan Puzyna de Kosielsko (later Cardinal) (1886.02.26 – 1895.01.22)
- Seweryn Morawski (later Archbishop) (1881.05.13 – 1885.02.15)
- Valery Henryk Kamionko (1815.07.10 – 1840.08.26)
- Kajetan Ignacy Kicki (later Archbishop) (1783.07.18 – 1797.12.18)
- Ferdynand Onufry Kicki (later Archbishop) (1777.04.23 – 1778.09.28)
- Kryspin Cieszkowski (1772.12.14 – 1792?)
- Samuel Głowiński (1733.12.02 – 1776.09.14)
- Hieronim Maciej Jełowicki (1725.02.21 – 1732.01.08)
- Stefan Bogusław Rupniewski (1713.05.22 – 1716.12.23)
- John Skarbek (later Archbishop) (1696.01.02 – 1713.01.30)

== See also ==
- List of Catholic dioceses in Ukraine
- Catholicism in Ukraine
- Primate of Galicia and Lodomeria

== Sources and external links ==
- GCatholic.org - data for all sections
- Website of the Archdiocese
- catholic-hierarchy.org
- Herbermann, Charles, ed. (1913). "Lemberg" . Catholic Encyclopedia. New York: Robert Appleton Company.
