= Jan Puzyna de Kosielsko =

Polish cardinal

His Eminence Jan Puzyna de Kosielsko
- Cardinal, Bishop of Kraków
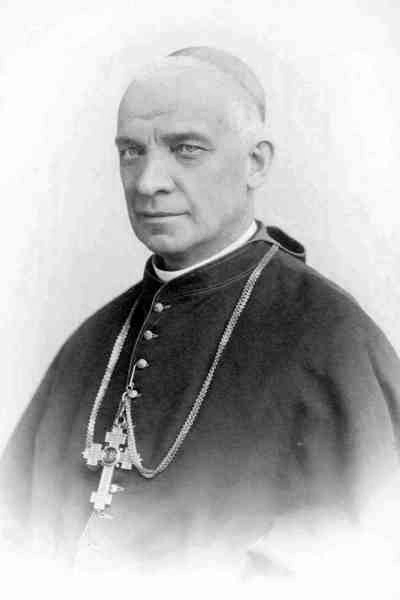
- Church: Catholic Church
- Appointed: 15 April 1901
- Installed: 15 April 1901
- Term ended: 8 September 1911
- Predecessor: Albin Dunajewski
- Successor: Adam Stefan Sapieha
- Previous posts: Auxiliary Bishop of Lviv, Ukraine, (1886); Titular Bishop of Memphis (1886–1895); Cardinal-Priest of Ss. Vitale, Valeria, Gervasio e Protasio

Orders
- Ordination: 8 December 1878
- Consecration: 25 March 1886 by Mieczyslaw Halka Ledóchowski
- Created cardinal: 15 April 1901 by Pope Leo XIII

Personal details
- Born: Prince Jan Duklan Maurycy Paweł Puzyna de Kosielsko; 13 September 1842 Gwoździec, Galicia, Austrian Empire
- Died: 8 September 1911 (aged 68) Kraków, Galicia, Austria-Hungary
- Denomination: Catholic

Prince Jan Duklan Maurycy Paweł Puzyna de Kosielsko (13 September 1842 – 8 September 1911) was a Polish Catholic Cardinal who was auxiliary bishop of Lwów (now Lviv, Ukraine) from 1886 to 1895, and the bishop of Kraków from 1895 until his death in 1911. Named a Cardinal in 1901, he was known for his conservative views and authoritarianism.

== Biography ==
Puzyna was born in 1842 in what was then a part of the Austrian Empire and former part of the Kingdom of Poland, in the diocese of Lwów. He earned a doctorate in law from the University of Lwów on 24 June 1870. He began a career in civil administration, but decided to embrace an ecclesiastical career. Ordained a priest on 1 December 1878, he was a vicar (assistant pastor) at Przeworsk, and then became a Canon of the Cathedral of Przemyśl. He was named auxiliary bishop of the Latin-rite Archbishop of Lwów and titular bishop of Memphis on 26 February 1886. He was consecrated a bishop on 25 March of that same year by Mieczysław Halka-Ledóchowski, with Archbishop Franziskus von Paula Graf von Schönborn of Prague and Archbishop Joseph Sembratovych of Ukrainian rite Lwów. He was translated to the then since 1925 Archdiocese of Kraków on 22 January 1895.

On 15 April 1901, Puzyna was created a cardinal-priest, with the title of Santi Vitale, Valeria, Gervasio e Protasio by Pope Leo XIII. He received his red hat on 9 June 1902.

During the conclave of 1903, acting on behalf of his Sovereign, Emperor Franz Joseph I of Austria, he presented a veto against the election of Cardinal Mariano Rampolla. Puzyna wanted to avoid the election of Rampolla, who was sympathetic to Russia and Germany. Among other things, Rampolla sought to curry favor with Russia by abolishing the Polish language and instituting Russian in the Russian partition's Catholic churches. These were ethnic and linguistic considerations.

Emperor Franz Joseph I of Austria, too, did not wish to see Rampolla elected to the Chair of Peter. He held a grudge against Rampolla for opposing a proper burial for his son Rudolf, Crown Prince of Austria, upon Rudolf's suicide. Rampolla also openly supported political forces in Austria that were hostile to the Emperor. The Emperor therefore authorized the Cardinal to present the veto in his name.

Styles of Jan Puzyna de Kosielsko
- Reference style: His Eminence
- Spoken style: Your Eminence
- Informal style: Cardinal
- See: Krakow

On his way to the conclave, Puzyna met in Vienna with the Emperor and proposed that the Emperor present his veto, jus exclusivae, against Cardinal Rampolla. The Emperor subscribed to the idea, and Puzyna presented the veto on the third day of the conclave, in the name of His Apostolic Majesty Francis Joseph, Emperor of Austria and King of Hungary. When the veto was read, Cardinal Luigi Oreglia di Santo Stefano, the Dean of the College of Cardinals, replied, "This communication cannot be received officially or unofficially. No cardinal is to give any consideration to this 'veto' and all are to continue to vote according to their conscience." In other words, the attempt at a veto was rejected (as a matter of procedure), but ended in defeat for Rampolla regardless.

The Secretary of the Conclave, Archbishop Rafael Merry del Val, reported later that Cardinal Puzyna de Kosielsko came to see him, demanding to announce his veto against Cardinal Rampolla in the Emperor's name. Merry del Val protested and refused even to accept the document. Rampolla, according to Merry del Val, in fact actually attracted further votes subsequent to the veto. However, Merry del Val later told Ludwig von Pastor that he thought Rampolla was unlikely in any case to have won since a majority of the cardinals wanted a more conservative direction following the relatively liberal pontificate of Pope Leo XIII, an opinion he himself shared. (Note: Valérie Pirie also claims that Rampolla would never have won in the conclave, and that all that the veto accomplished was to make him appear a sympathetic figure as a victim of Austrian hostility "inasmuch as it gave his defeat the appearance of having been brought about by a treacherous knock-out blow, when in reality his failure was inevitable; the world at large being still convinced that had it not been for the Austrian veto Rampolla would certainly have been elected Pope.")

The veto, once conceded by tradition to the Emperor, the King of France and the King of Spain, was abolished by the newly elected Pope Pius X, who imposed the penalty of excommunication upon anyone who would dare to introduce a veto, or otherwise interfere in the election of the Roman Pontiff. Pope Pius X further decreed that all cardinals should take an oath at the beginning of the conclave, promising not to aid any civil power in an attempt to influence the election of the pope.

Puzyna was decorated with the Grand Cross of the Order of Saint Stephen of Hungary in 1904. He was a member of the Sacred Congregation Consistorial, the SC of Bishops and Regulars, the SC of the Index, the SC of Indulgences and Relics, and the SC of Studies.

Jan Cardinal Puzyna de Kosielsko died in Kraków in 1911, five days before his 69th birthday.

== See also ==
- List of Roman Catholic bishops of Kraków
- Papal conclave, 1903

== Notes ==
Catholic Church titles
Preceded by Albin Dunajewski	Bishop of Kraków; 1895–1911	Succeeded by Adam Stefan Sapieha
