= List of Catholic bishops of Lviv =

The Latin Church Archdiocese of Lviv was erected on August 28, 1412, in the city of Lwów (today Lviv). It serves as a metropolitan see of the Roman Catholic Church in Ukraine. The principal patron of the Archdiocese is the Blessed Virgin Mary Mother of Mercy.

== History ==
In 1909 Pope Pius X proclaimed the Blessed Virgin Mary, Queen of Poland and Blessed Jakub Strzemię to be the patrons of the Lviv archdiocese. In 1910 the Blessed Virgin Mary, Queen of Poland became the principal patron. Nowadays the principal patron is the Blessed Virgin Mary Mother of Mercy (NMP Łaskawa). The patron's day is celebrated on 1 April, the day when King of Poland Jan II Kazimierz Waza took an oath at the Lwów Cathedral in 1655, during "The Deluge," took vows of loyalty to God and declared the Mother of God to be the Queen of Poland.

== List of Latin Catholic bishops of Lviv ==
=== Bishops of Lwów (Lviv) ===
- 1375–1380 Maciej
- 1384–1390 Bernard
- 1391–1409 bl. Jakub Strzemię (Jakub Strepa)
- 1410–1412 Mikołaj Trąba

=== Metropolitan Archbishops of Lwow (Lviv) ===
In 1414 a metropolitan see was moved from Halych to Lviv. Diocese of Halicz was merged with diocese of Lwow.

- 1412–1436 Jan Rzeszowski
- 1437–1450 Jan Odrowąż
- 1451–1477 Gregory of Sanok
- 1480 Jan Długosz
- 1481–1488 Jan Strzelecki (Wątróbka)
- 1488–1503 Andrzej Boryszewski
- 1505–1540 Bernard Wilczek
- 1540–1554 Piotr Starzechowski
- 1555–1560 Feliks Ligęza
- 1561–1565 Paweł Tarło
- 1565–1575 Stanisław Słomowski
- 1576–1582 Jan Sieniński
- 1583–1603 Jan Dymitr Solikowski
- 1604–1614 Jan Zamojski
- 1614–1633 Jan Andrzej Próchnicki
- 1633–1645 Stanisław Grochowski
- 1645–1653 Mikołaj Krosnowski
- 1654–1669 Jan Tarnowski
- 1670–1677 Albert Koryciński
- 1681–1698 Konstanty Lipski
- 1700–1709 Konstanty Zieliński
- 1710–1711 Mikołaj Popoławski
- 1713–1733 Jan Skarbek
- 1737–1757 Mikołaj Gerard Wyżycki
- 1757 Mikołaj Dembowski
- 1758–1759 Władysław Aleksander Łubieński
- 1760–1780 Wacław Hieronim Sierakowski
- 1780–1797 Ferdynand Onufry Kicki
- 1797–1812 Kajetan Ignacy Kicki
- 1815–1833 Andrzej Alojzy Ankwicz
- 1834–1835 Franz Xaver Luschin
- 1836–1846 František Pištěk
- 1847–1848 Václav Vilém Václavíček
- 1849–1858 Łukasz Baraniecki
- 1860–1884 Franciszek Ksawery Wierzchleyski
- 1885–1900 Seweryn Morawski
- 1900–1923 st. Józef Bilczewski
- 1923–1944 Bolesław Twardowski

=== Metropolitan Archbishops of Lviv (and Ukraine de facto) ===
An attempt to liquidate the Catholic Church in Ukraine was made with the start of World War II in 1939 and partition of Poland between Nazi Germany and Soviet Union. After World War II and until fall of the Soviet Union, the Archdiocese of Lwów was centered in Lubaczów.

- 1944–1962 Eugeniusz Baziak
  - 1962–1964 Michał Orliński (Apostolic Administrator in Lubaczów)
  - 1964–1973 Jan Nowicki (Apostolic Administrator in Lubaczów)
  - 1973–1983 Marian Rechowicz (Apostolic Administrator in Lubaczów)
  - 1983–1984 Stanisław Cały (Apostolic Administrator in Lubaczów)
  - 1984–1991 Marian Jaworski (Apostolic Administrator in Lubaczów)
- 1991–2008 Marian Jaworski
- 2008–present Mieczysław Mokrzycki

== Auxiliary bishops ==
- 1617–1625 Tomasz Pirawski
- 1626–1633 Łukasz Kaliński
- 1634–1641 Zachariasz Nowoszycki
- 1641–1654 Andrzej Śrzedrzyński
- 1657–1663 Stefan Kazimierz Charbicki
- 1663–1693 Jerzy Giedzieński
- 1696–1713 Jan Skarbek, Appointed Archbishop of Lviv
- 1713–1716 Stefan Bogusław Rupniewski
- 1717–1725 Jan Feliks Szaniawski
- 1725–1732 Hieronim Maciej Jełowicki
- 1733–1776 Samuel Głowiński
- 1772–1792 Kryspin Cieszkowski
- 1777–1778 Ferdynand Onufry Kicki, Appointed Coadjutor Archbishop of Lviv
- 1783–1797 Kajetan Ignacy Kicki, Appointed Archbishop of Lviv
- 1815–1840 Valery Henryk Kamionko
- 1881–1885 Seweryn Morawski, Appointed Archbishop of Lviv
- 1886–1895 Jan Puzyna de Kosielsko, Appointed Bishop of Kraków
- 1895–1906 Józef Weber
- 1906–1917 Władysław Bandurski
- 1918–1923 Bolesław Twardowski, appointed Archbishop of Lviv
- 1928–1933 Franciszek Lisowski
- 1933–1944 Eugeniusz Baziak, Appointed Coadjutor Archbishop of Lviv
- 1991–1995 Rafal Kiernicki
- 1991–1998 Markijan Trofimiak
- 1998–2002 Stanislaw Padewski
- 2002–2007 Marian Buczek
- 2002– Leon Malyi
- 2017– Eduard Kava

== See also ==
- List of Greek Catholic bishops of Lviv
- List of Armenian Catholic bishops of Lwów
- The Shoes of the Fisherman
