= Stanisław Udrzycki =

Most Reverend Stanisław Udrzycki
- Auxiliary Bishop of Lutsk; Titular Bishop of Argos
- Church: Catholic Church
- Diocese: Diocese of Lutsk
- In office: 1617–1621

Personal details
- Died: October 1621 Lutsk, Ukraine

Stanisław Udrzycki or Stanisław Udrycki (died October 1621) was a Roman Catholic prelate who served as Auxiliary Bishop of Lutsk (1617–1621) and Titular Bishop of Argos (1617–1621).

On 26 March 1632, Stanisław Udrzycki was appointed during the papacy of Pope Urban VIII as Auxiliary Bishop of Lutsk and Titular Bishop of Argos. On 27 May 1618, he was consecrated bishop by Jan Andrzej Próchnicki, Archbishop of Lviv. He served as Auxiliary Bishop of Lutsk until his death in Oct 1621. While bishop, he was the principal co-consecrator of Thomas Piranski, Auxiliary Bishop of Lviv (1618).

== External links and additional sources ==
- Cheney, David M. "Diocese of Lutsk". Catholic-Hierarchy.org. (for Chronology of Bishops) ^{[self-published]}
- Chow, Gabriel. "Diocese of Lutsk (Ukraine)". GCatholic.org. (for Chronology of Bishops) ^{[self-published]}
- Cheney, David M. "Argos (Titular See)". Catholic-Hierarchy.org. (for Chronology of Bishops) ^{[self-published]}
- Chow, Gabriel. "Titular Episcopal See of Argos (Greece)". GCatholic.org. (for Chronology of Bishops) ^{[self-published]}

Catholic Church titles
Preceded by Leandro Garuffi Rotelli de Piis	Titular Bishop of Argos; 1617–1621	Succeeded by Louis du Chaine
Preceded by	Auxiliary Bishop of Lutsk; 1617–1621	Succeeded by
