= Václavíček =

Václavíček (feminine Václavíčková) is a Czech surname. Notable people with the surname include:

- Rostislav Václavíček (1946–2022), Czech footballer
- Václav Vilém Václavíček (1788–1862), Czech Catholic priest and theological writer
