= Łukasz Baraniecki =

Polish Archbishop (1798–1858)

- Metropolitan Archbishop of Roman Catholic Archdiocese of Lviv
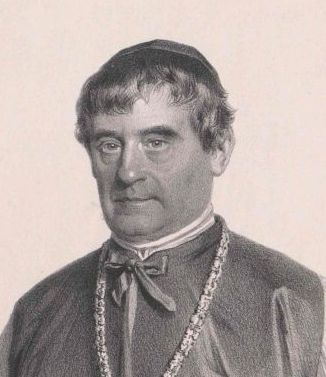
- Church: Roman Catholic Church
- Appointed: 28 September 1849
- Term ended: 30 June 1858
- Predecessor: Václav Vilém Václavíček
- Successor: Franciszek Ksawery Wierzchleyski
- Other post: Dean of the Cathedral Basilica of the Assumption, Lviv (1838–1849)

Orders
- Ordination: 6 October 1822 (Priest) by Andrzej Alojzy Ankwicz
- Consecration: 13 January 1850 (Bishop) by Franciszek Ksawery Wierzchleyski

Personal details
- Born: Łukasz Baraniecki; 14 October 1798 Kabarivtsi, Habsburg monarchy (present day in Ternopil Raion, Ternopil Oblast, Ukraine)
- Died: 30 June 1858 (aged 59) Cieszanów, Austrian Empire (present day in Podkarpackie Voivodeship, Poland)

Łukasz Baraniecki (Ukrainian: Лукаш Баранецький; Polish: Łukasz Baraniecki; 14 October 1798 – 30 June 1858) was a Roman Catholic prelate who served as a Metropolitan Archbishop of the Roman Catholic Archdiocese of Lviv from 28 September 1849 until his death on 30 June 1858.

== Life ==
Baraniecki was born in the szlachta Polish Roman Catholic family in present day Ternopil Raion. After graduation of the school and Order of Saint Basil the Great college in Buchach education, he subsequently joined Faculty of Theology of the University of Lviv and the Roman Catholic Theological Seminary in Lviv. He was ordained as priest on 6 October 1822, for the Roman Catholic Archdiocese of Lviv by Archbishop Andrzej Alojzy Ankwicz, when completed of the philosophical and theological studies.

After his ordination, he served as an assistant priest, and later as a parish priest in the different parishes throughout his native Archdiocese. In 1838 he was appointed as a dean of the Cathedral Basilica of the Assumption, Lviv and simultaneously as a dean of Lviv deanery. The fulfilled this service until his archbishop's nomination.

On 28 September 1849, he was confirmed by the Pope Pius IX as a Metropolitan Archbishop of Roman Catholic Archdiocese of Lviv. On 13 January 1850, he was consecrated as bishop by Bishop Franciszek Ksawery Wierzchleyski and other prelates of the Roman Catholic Church and the Ukrainian Greek-Catholic Church in the Cathedral Basilica of the Assumption, Lviv.

Archbishop Baraniecki died, while in the office, on June 30, 1858, during a canonical visitation by stroke and was buried in the crypt of the Mary Gromnicza Church.

Family coat of arms Sas of Archbishop Łukasz Baraniecki

Catholic Church titles
Preceded by Václav Vilém Václavíček	Metropolitan Archbishop of Roman Catholic Archdiocese of Lviv; 1849–1858	Succeeded by Franciszek Ksawery Wierzchleyski
