= Gaspar Trizenieski =

Polish Roman Catholic prelate

Most Reverend Gaspar Trizenieski
- Auxiliary Bishop of Gniezno; Titular Bishop of Halmiros
- Church: Catholic Church
- Archdiocese: Archdiocese of Gniezno
- In office: 1660–?

Orders
- Consecration: 11 Sep 1661 by Zygmunt Czyżowski

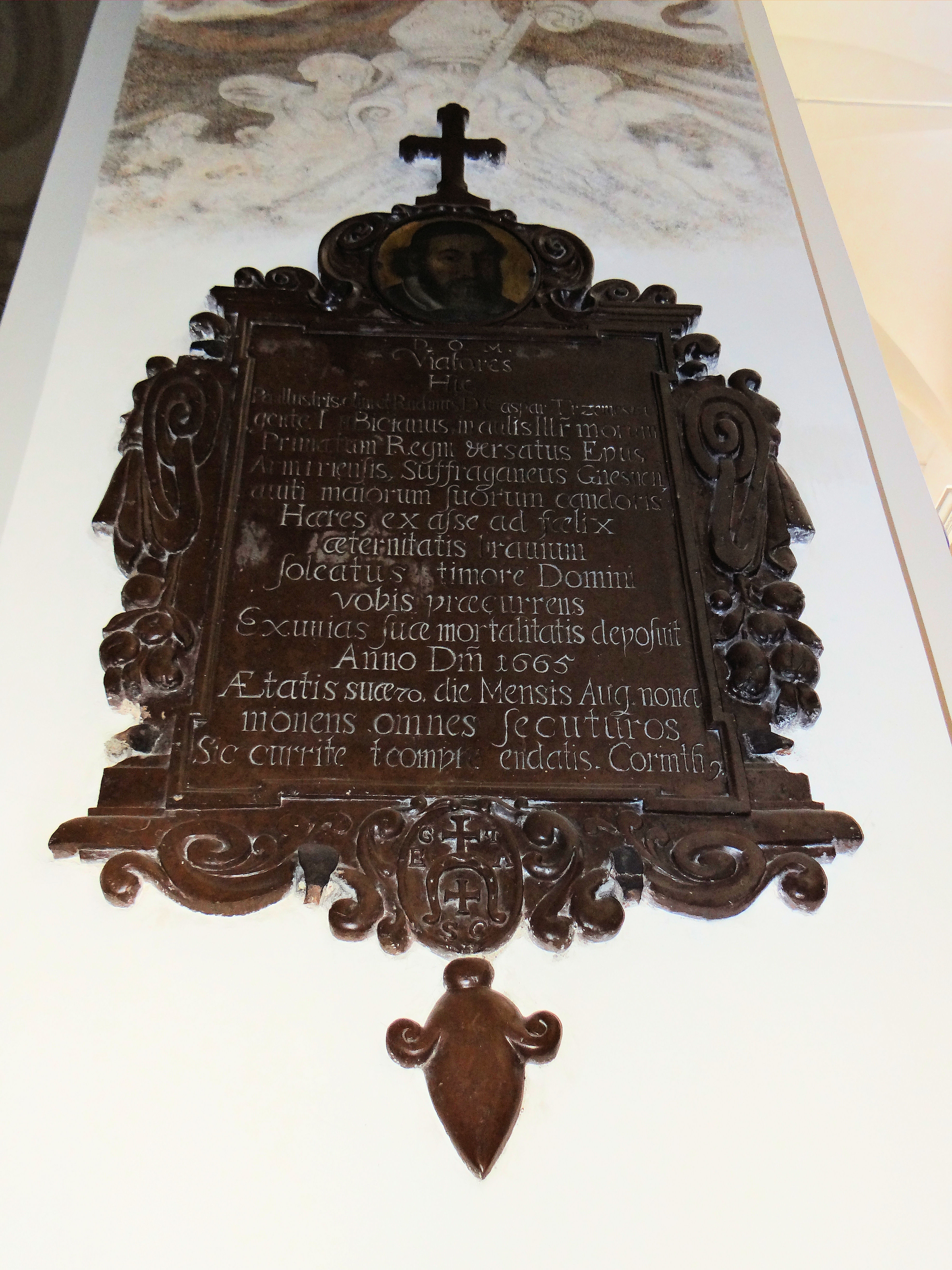
Cathedral Basilica in Łowicz - epitaph of Kasper Trzemeski, suffragan of Gniezno

Gaspar Trizenieski was a Roman Catholic prelate who served as Auxiliary Bishop of Gniezno (1660–?).

== Biography ==
On 30 Aug 1660, Gaspar Trizenieski was appointed during the papacy of Pope Alexander VII as Auxiliary Bishop of Gniezno and Titular Bishop of Halmiros. In 1645, he was consecrated bishop by Zygmunt Czyżowski, Titular Bishop of Lacedaemonia, with Stefan Kazimierz Charbicki, Auxiliary Bishop of Lviv and Titular Bishop of Nicopolis ad Iaterum, and Stanisław Domaniewski, Titular Bishop of Margarita, serving as co-consecrators.
