= Jan Dymitr Solikowski =

Polish archbishop

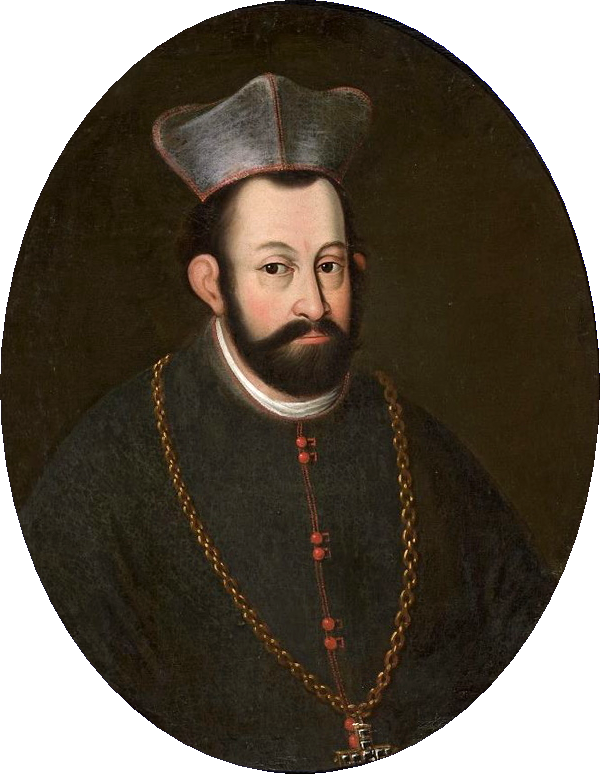
Jan Dymitr Solikowski

Jan Dymitr Solikowski (1539, in Sieradz – 27 June 1603, in Lwów, Poland) was a Polish writer, diplomat, Archbishop of Lwów.

He was since 1564 secretary of King Zygmunt II August. He participated in the rebuild of structures of the church in Polish Livonia, after the wars of King Stefan Batory. In 1583 he became Archbishop of Lwów. He was co-author of the Union of Brest. He was author of several political and historical works. In his History of Poland (1647), Solikowski looked upon the ethnic Armenian minority with suspicion and portrayed them as wealthy merchants who had close ties to the Ottomans.

== Works ==
- Ziemianin (1565)
- Apocalipsis (1580)

Preceded by Jan Sieniński	Archbishop of Lwów; 1583–1603	Succeeded by Jan Zamoyski
