= Zbenice =

- Municipality
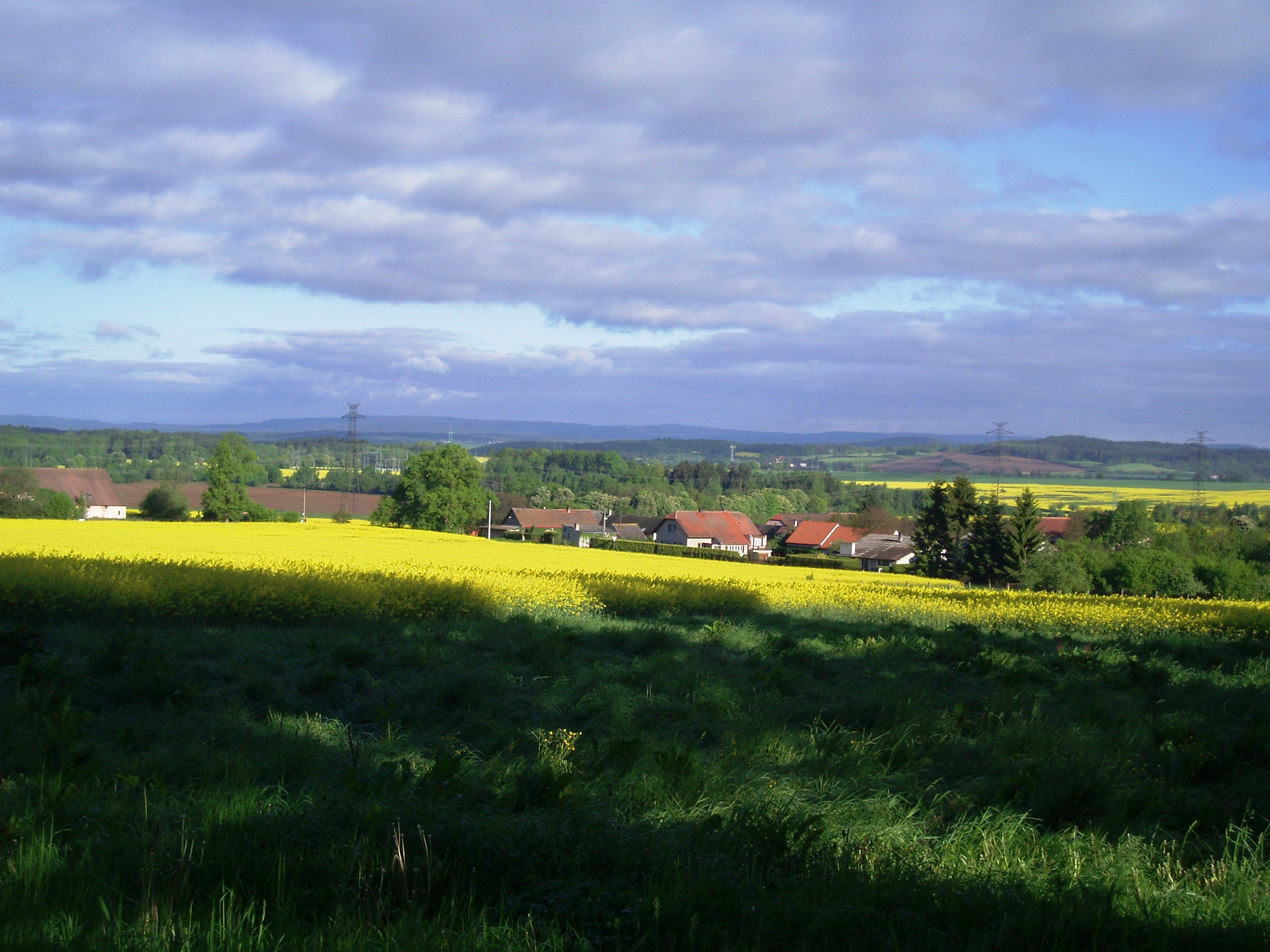
- General view

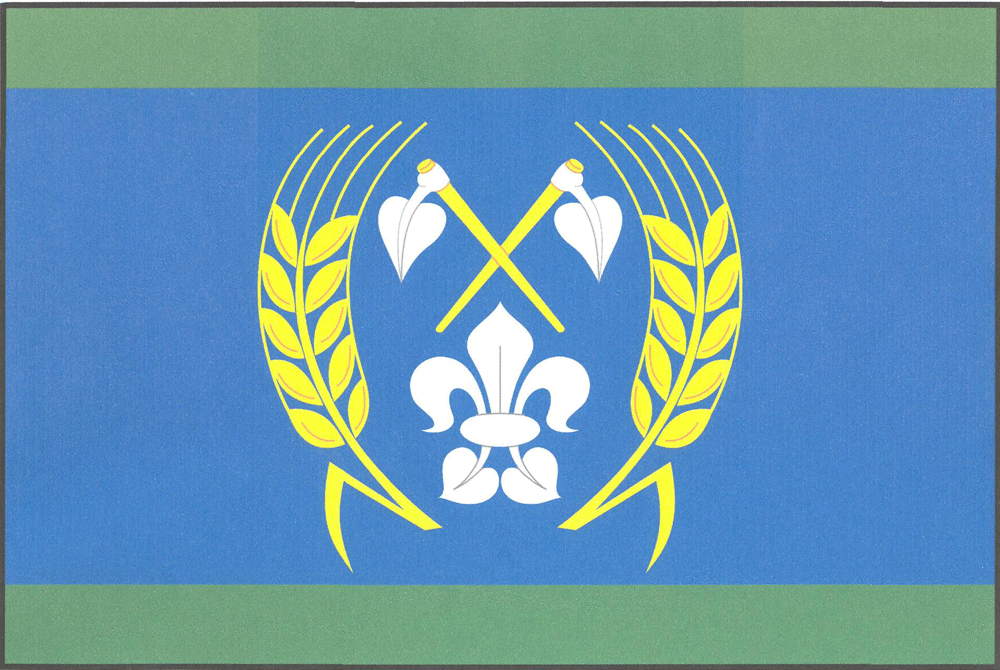
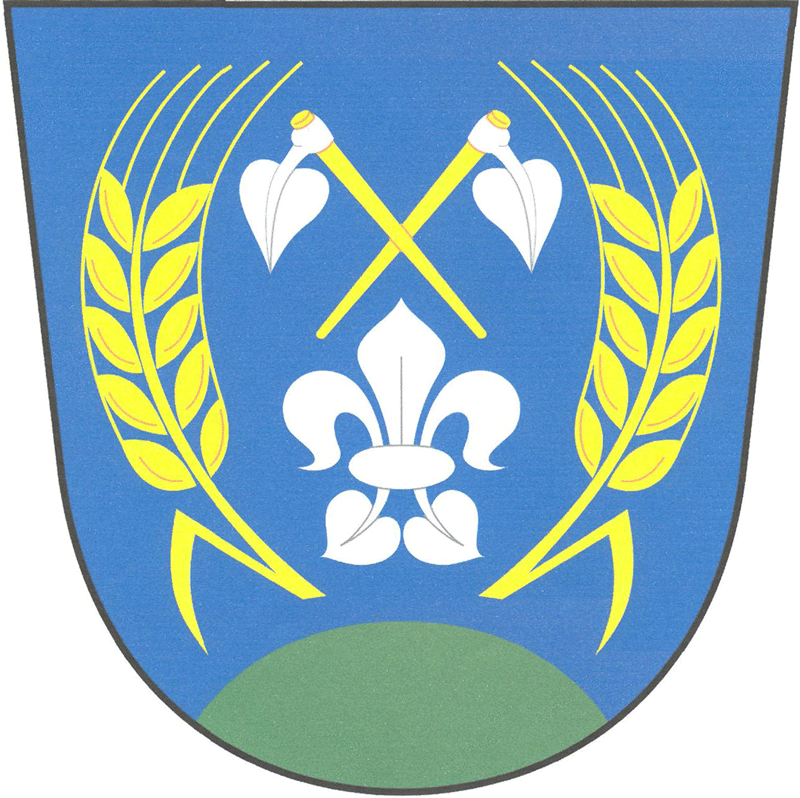
- Flag Coat of arms

- Location in the Czech Republic
- Coordinates: 49°35′33″N 14°5′19″E
- Country: Czech Republic
- Region: Central Bohemian
- District: Příbram
- First mentioned: 1293

Area
  - Total: 3.84 km^{2} (1.48 sq mi)
- Elevation: 533 m (1,749 ft)

Population (2026-01-01)
  - Total: 133
  - Density: 34.6/km^{2} (89.7/sq mi)
- Time zone: UTC+1 (CET)
  - Summer (DST): UTC+2 (CEST)
- Postal code: 262 31
- Website: www.zbenice.cz

Zbenice is a municipality and village in Příbram District in the Central Bohemian Region of the Czech Republic. It has about 100 inhabitants.

== Demographics ==
Historical population
Year	Pop.	±%
1869	333	—
1880	317	−4.8%
1890	320	+0.9%
1900	297	−7.2%
1910	288	−3.0%
1921	283	−1.7%
1930	265	−6.4%
1950	206	−22.3%
1961	209	+1.5%
1970	173	−17.2%
1980	140	−19.1%
1991	120	−14.3%
2001	117	−2.5%
2011	130	+11.1%
2021	126	−3.1%
Source: Censuses

== Notable people ==
- Alois Josef, Freiherr von Schrenk (1802–1849), archbishop of Prague
