= Gregory of Sanok =

Polish bishop (1403/07–1477)

- Archbishop of Lvów
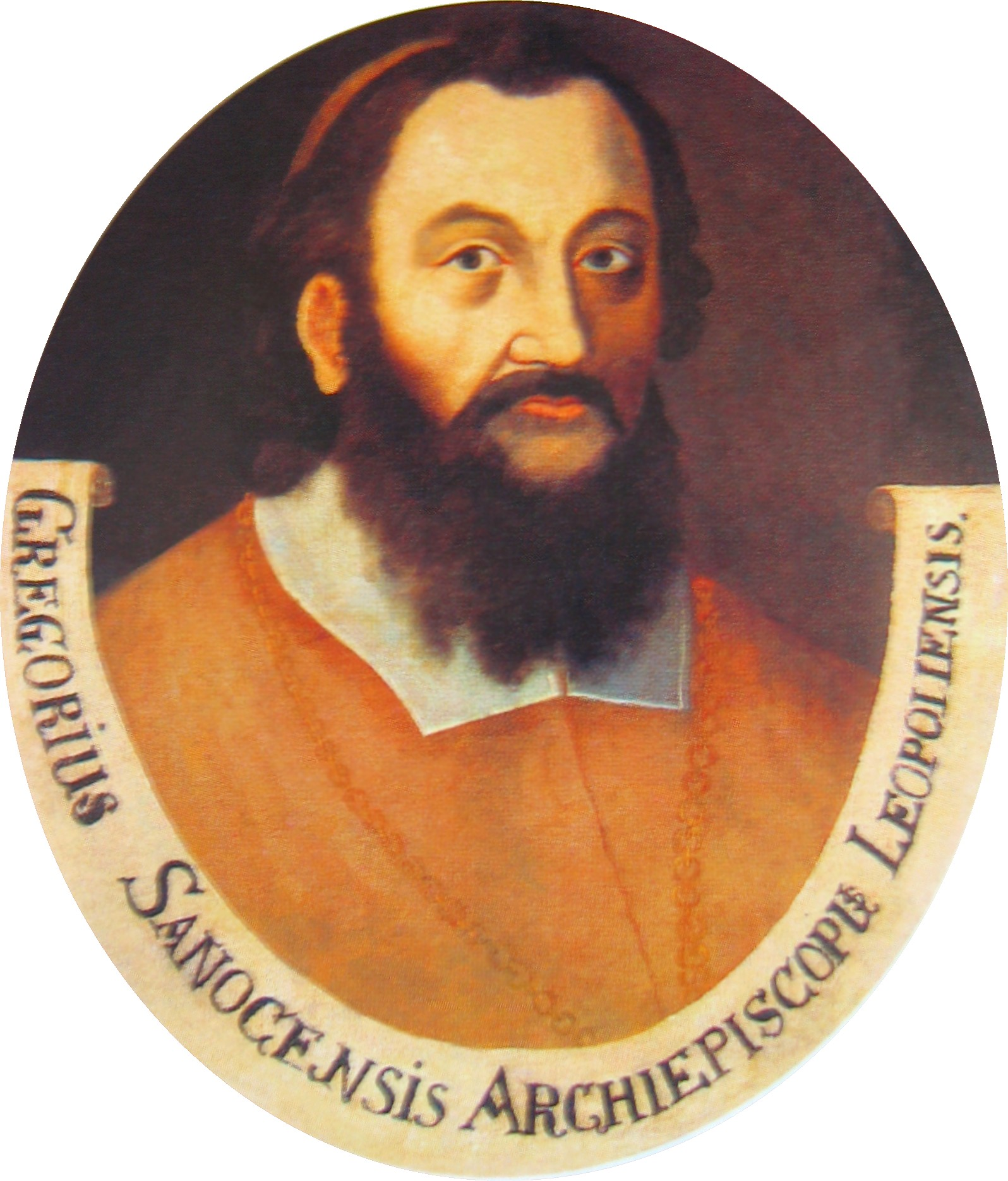
- Gregory of Sanok, Humanist and Archbishop of Lwów
- Native name: Grzegorz z Sanoka
- In office: 1451 – 1477
- Predecessor: Jan Odrowąż
- Successor: Jan Długosz

Orders
- Consecration: 4 July 1451 by Zbigniew Oleśnicki

Personal details
- Born: 1403 or 1407 Sanok, Crown of the Kingdom of Poland
- Died: 29 January 1477 Rohatyn, Crown of the Kingdom of Poland (now Ukraine)

Gregory of Sanok (Polish: Grzegorz z Sanoka; 1403 or 1407 in Sanok – 29 January 1477 in Rohatyn) was a Polish bishop, a professor at the Kraków Academy, metropolitan archbishop of Lwów, scholar, philosopher and a major figure of Polish humanism.

== Life ==
He left home at age twelve and for the next ten years traveled across Europe, including Germany, where he learned the language.

After his prolonged studies abroad, in 1421 he returned and initially studied at Kraków Academy, serving as choirmaster. He graduated in 1433, was appointed tutor to the children of Jan Tarnowski, and journeyed with the family to Italy. He came to the attention of Pope Eugenius IV and studied in Florence. After returning to Poland in 1439 he was a professor of Graeco-Roman poetry and Italian literature at the Kraków Academy. He became Archbishop of Lwów in 1451 and a pioneer of Polish humanism. He gathered scholars and poets at his residence in Dunajów.
