= Choustník =

- Municipality
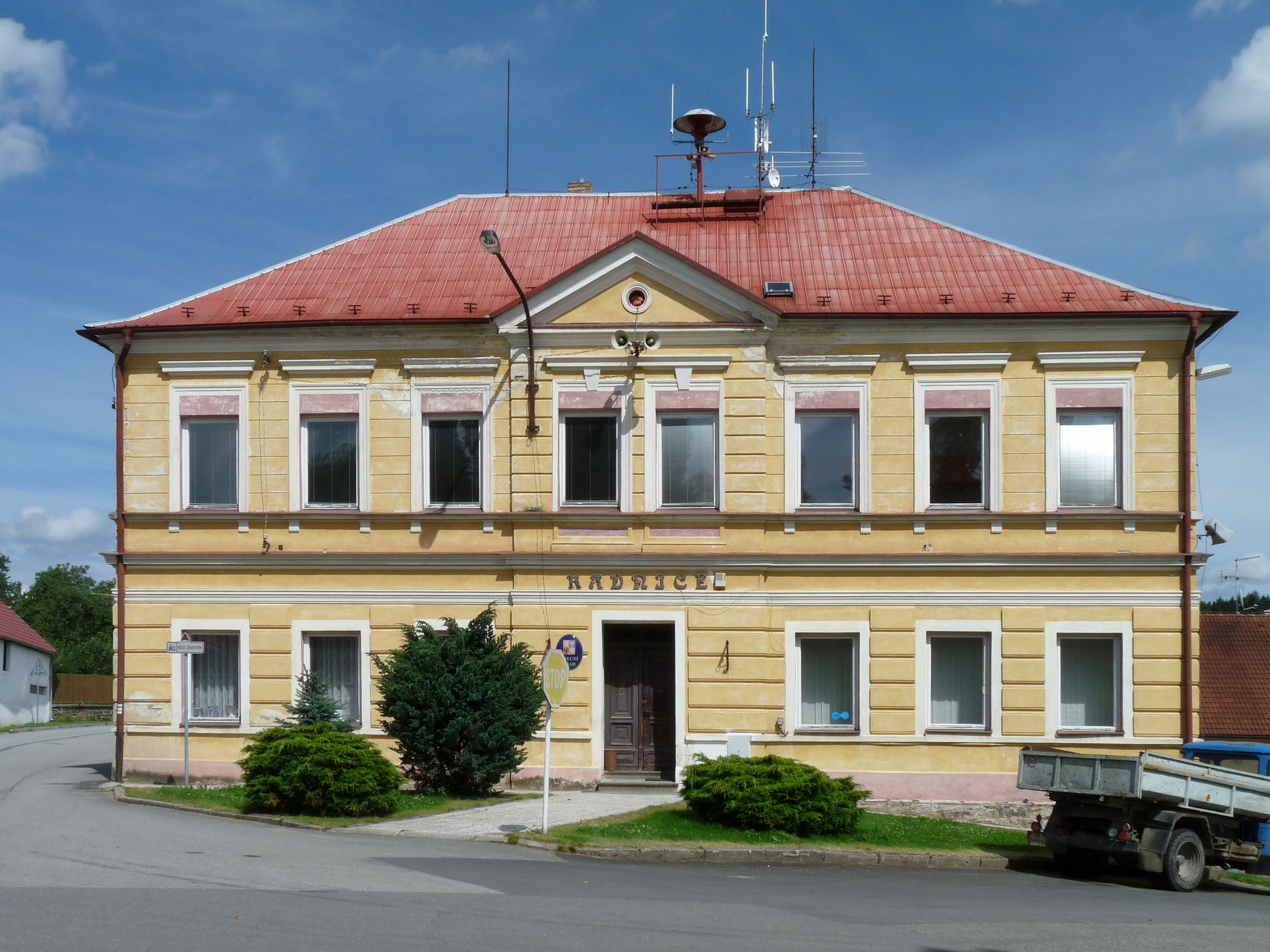
- Municipal office

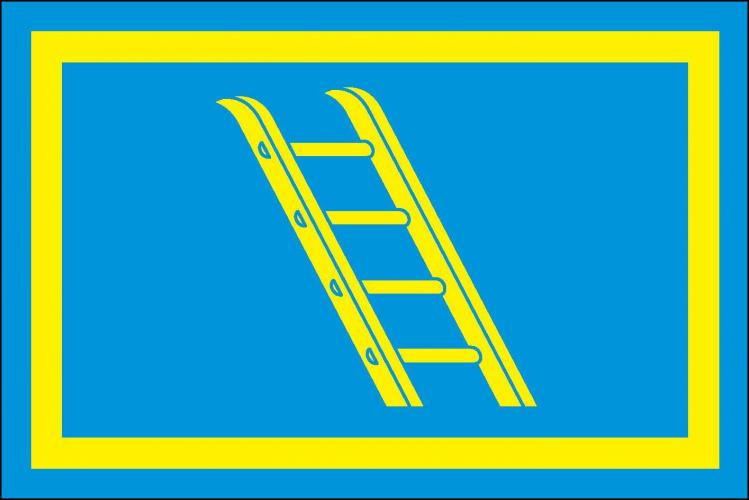
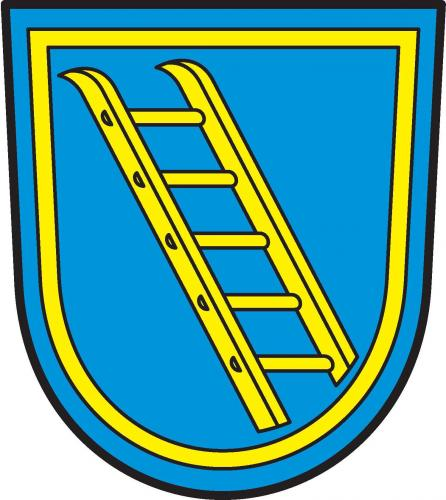
- Flag Coat of arms

- Location in the Czech Republic
- Coordinates: 49°19′59″N 14°50′18″E
- Country: Czech Republic
- Region: South Bohemian
- District: Tábor
- First mentioned: 1282

Area
  - Total: 12.62 km^{2} (4.87 sq mi)
- Elevation: 548 m (1,798 ft)

Population (2026-01-01)
  - Total: 479
  - Density: 38.0/km^{2} (98.3/sq mi)
- Time zone: UTC+1 (CET)
  - Summer (DST): UTC+2 (CEST)
- Postal code: 391 18
- Website: www.obec-choustnik.cz

Choustník is a municipality and village in Tábor District in the South Bohemian Region of the Czech Republic. It has about 500 inhabitants.

Choustník lies approximately 16 kilometres (10 mi) south-east of Tábor, 49 km (30 mi) north-east of České Budějovice, and 89 km (55 mi) south of Prague.

== Administrative division ==
Choustník consists of three municipal parts (in brackets population according to the 2021 census):

- Choustník (364)
- Kajetín (19)
- Předboř (101)

== Demographics ==
Historical population
Year	Pop.	±%
1869	1,055	—
1880	998	−5.4%
1890	948	−5.0%
1900	917	−3.3%
1910	912	−0.5%
1921	866	−5.0%
1930	791	−8.7%
1950	582	−26.4%
1961	747	+28.4%
1970	653	−12.6%
1980	565	−13.5%
1991	629	+11.3%
2001	525	−16.5%
2011	501	−4.6%
2021	484	−3.4%
Source: Censuses

== Notable people ==
- Václav Vilém Václavíček (1788–1862), Roman Catholic priest and theological writer
