= Zachariasz Nowoszycki =

Ukrainian prelate

Most Reverend Zachariasz Nowoszycki
- Auxiliary Bishop of Lviv; Titular Bishop of Nicopolis in Epiro
- Church: Catholic Church
- Diocese: Diocese of Lviv
- In office: 1634–1641

Orders
- Consecration: 21 Dec 1634 by Cosimo de Torres

Personal details
- Died: 14 March 1641 Lviv, Ukraine

Zachariasz Nowoszycki (died 14 March 1641) was a Roman Catholic prelate who served as Auxiliary Bishop of Lviv (1634–1641) and Titular Bishop of Nicopolis in Epiro (1634–1641).

== Biography ==
On 4 Dec 1634, Zachariasz Nowoszycki was appointed during the papacy of Pope Urban VIII as Auxiliary Bishop of Lviv and Titular Bishop of Nicopolis in Epiro. On 21 Dec 1634, he was consecrated bishop by Cosimo de Torres, Archbishop of Monreale. He served as Auxiliary Bishop of Lviv until his death on March 14, 1641.

== External links and additional sources ==
- Cheney, David M. "Archdiocese of Lviv". Catholic-Hierarchy.org. (for Chronology of Bishops) ^{[self-published]}
- Chow, Gabriel. "Metropolitan Archdiocese of Lviv (Ukraine)". GCatholic.org. (for Chronology of Bishops) ^{[self-published]}
- Cheney, David M. "Nicopolis in Epiro (Titular See)". Catholic-Hierarchy.org. (for Chronology of Bishops) ^{[self-published]}

Catholic Church titles
| Preceded by Łukasz Kaliński | Titular Bishop of Nicopolis in Epiro; 1634–1641 | Succeeded by Andrzej Śrzedrzyński |
| Preceded by | Auxiliary Bishop of Lviv; 1634–1641 | Succeeded by |
