= Tomasz Pirawski =

Roman Catholic bishop

Most Reverend Tomasz Pirawski
- Auxiliary Bishop of Lviv; Titular Bishop of Nicopolis in Epiro
- Church: Catholic Church
- Diocese: Diocese of Lviv
- In office: 1617–1625

Orders
- Consecration: 27 May 1618 by Jan Andrzej Próchnicki

Personal details
- Born: 1564 Kazimierz, Poland
- Died: 30 Jul 1625 (age 61) Lviv, Ukraine

Tomasz Pirawski (1564 – 30 Jul 1625) (Ukrainian: Томаш Піравський) was a Roman Catholic prelate who served as Auxiliary Bishop of Lviv (1617–1625) and Titular Bishop of Nicopolis in Epiro (1617–1625).

== Biography ==
Tomasz Pirawski was born in 1564 in Kazimierz, Poland. On 13 Nov 1617, he was appointed during the papacy of Pope Paul V as Auxiliary Bishop of Lviv and Titular Bishop of Nicopolis in Epiro. On 27 May 1618, he was consecrated bishop by Jan Andrzej Próchnicki, Archbishop of Lviv, with Stanisław Sieciński, Bishop of Przemyśl, and Stanisław Udrzycki, Titular Bishop of Argos and Auxiliary Bishop of Lutsk, serving as co-consecrators. He served as Auxiliary Bishop of Lviv until his death in 30 Jul 1625.

== External links and additional sources ==
- Cheney, David M. "Archdiocese of Lviv". Catholic-Hierarchy.org. (for Chronology of Bishops) ^{[self-published]}
- Chow, Gabriel. "Metropolitan Archdiocese of Lviv (Ukraine)". GCatholic.org. (for Chronology of Bishops) ^{[self-published]}
- Cheney, David M. "Nicopolis in Epiro (Titular See)". Catholic-Hierarchy.org. (for Chronology of Bishops) ^{[self-published]}

Catholic Church titles
Preceded by	Titular Bishop of Nicopolis in Epiro; 1617–1625	Succeeded by Łukasz Kaliński
Preceded by	Auxiliary Bishop of Lviv; 1617–1625	Succeeded by
