= Jerzy Giedzieński =

Roman Catholic auxiliary bishop of Lviv from 1663 to 1693

Most Reverend Jerzy Giedzieński
- Auxiliary Bishop of Lviv; Titular Bishop of Nicopolis in Armenia
- Church: Catholic Church
- Diocese: Diocese of Lwow
- In office: 1663–1693

Personal details
- Died: 1693

Jerzy Giedzieński (died 1693) was a Roman Catholic prelate from Poland who served as Auxiliary Bishop of Lviv (1663–1693) and Titular Bishop of Nicopolis in Epiro (1663–1693).

== Biography ==
On 10 Dec 1663, Jerzy Giedzieński was appointed during the papacy of Pope Urban VIII as Auxiliary Bishop of Lviv and Titular Bishop of Nicopolis in Epiro. He was consecrated bishop in 1664. He served as Auxiliary Bishop of Lviv until his death in 1693.

== External links and additional sources ==
- Cheney, David M. "Archdiocese of Lviv". Catholic-Hierarchy.org. (for Chronology of Bishops) ^{[self-published]}
- Chow, Gabriel. "Metropolitan Archdiocese of Lviv (Ukraine)". GCatholic.org. (for Chronology of Bishops) ^{[self-published]}
- Cheney, David M. "Nicopolis in Epiro (Titular See)". Catholic-Hierarchy.org. (for Chronology of Bishops) ^{[self-published]}

Catholic Church titles
Preceded by Stefan Kazimierz Charbicki	Titular Bishop of Nicopolis in Epiro; 1663–1693	Succeeded by Alessandro Grossi
Preceded by	Auxiliary Bishop of Lviv; 1663–1693	Succeeded by
