= Alois Josef, Freiherr von Schrenk =

Czech Roman Catholic archbishop

The Most Reverend Alois Josef, Freiherr von Schrenk
- Prince-Archbishop of Prague
- An 1838 medal commemorating the elevation of Alois Josef von Schrenk to the archbishopric of Prague. (Note: Clearly visible are his own coat of arms with the Freiherr crown. The inscription gives his name in Czech as ALOYS JOSEF SWOBODNÝ PÁN SCHRENK Z NOTZING.)
- Installed: 4 November 1838
- Term ended: 5 March 1849 (10 years, 4 months)
- Predecessor: Ondřej Alois Ankwicz ze Skarbek–Peslawice
- Successor: Bedřich Schwarzenberg

Personal details
- Born: 24 March 1802 Zbenice, Habsburg Monarchy
- Died: 5 March 1849 (aged 46) Prague, Austrian Empire
- Denomination: Roman Catholic Church

Alois Josef, Freiherr von Schrenk und Nötzig (Czech: Aloys Josef svobodný pán Schrenk z Notzing) (24 March 1802 – 5 March 1849) was the Roman Catholic archbishop of Prague from 1838 to 1849.

== Biography ==
Schrenk was born in Zbenice in 1802 with the hereditary title of Freiherr von Schrenk und Nötzig. He was ordained a priest in 1825. On 12 February 1838, he was appointed auxiliary bishop of Olomouc in the Czech Republic, as well as titular bishop of Ptolemais in Phoenicia. On 20 June 1838, Schrenk was appointed archbishop of Prague (called Prince Archbishop), was confirmed on 17 September 1838, and subsequently installed on 4 November 1838.

Schrenk invited the French congregation of the Sisters of Mercy of St. Borromeo to Prague. They established a hospital and nursing school on Petřín Hill below the Strahov Garden. The Prague community was confirmed as a separate congregation in 1841 and soon became one of the most numerous and most significant orders in Bohemia.

On 5 March 1849, he died at the age of 46, having been a bishop for 10 years.

The 1911 Catholic Encyclopedia makes mention of Schrenk in its entry for Prague:

In 1848 (Note: This is perhaps a dating error. Other sources state that Schrenk was appointed to his position in 1838, and if the 1848 date is to be believed, his archiepiscopate would be almost too brief for mention.) Alois, Freiherr von Schrenk became Prince Archbishop of Prague. On 15 March, the Emperor Ferdinand I of Austria announced his intention of granting a constitution. Schrenk may have thought that "freedom is a great good for those who know how to use it". On 22 March he issued a censure, as some priests, forgetting their sacred calling, turned the pulpit into a political platform. The freedom gained should rather be the signal for greater activity. His address at the Easter festival, posted on the streets in Czech and German, sought to allay the hostility to the Jewish population ... strain he had undergone shattered the health of the archbishop and he died in March, 1849, at the age of forty-seven. His successor was Cardinal Schwarzenberg.

== Notes ==
Catholic Church titles
Preceded by Andreas Alois Ankwicz von Skarbek-Poslawice	Archbishop of Prague; 1838–1849	Succeeded by Friedrich Johannes Jacob Celestin von Schwarzenberg
