= Stefan Kazimierz Charbicki =

Roman Catholic prelate (died 1663)

Most Reverend Stefan Kazimierz Charbicki
- Auxiliary Bishop of Lviv; Titular Bishop of Nicopolis ad Iaterum
- Church: Catholic Church
- Diocese: Diocese of Lviv
- In office: 1657–1663

Personal details
- Died: 8 June 1663 Lviv, Polish–Lithuanian Commonwealth (present day Ukraine)

Stefan Kazimierz Charbicki (died 8 June 1663) was a Roman Catholic prelate who served as Auxiliary Bishop of Lviv (1657–1663) and Titular Bishop of Nicopolis in Epiro (1657–1663).

== Biography ==
On 19 January 1657, Stefan Stefan Kazimierz Charbicki was appointed during the papacy of Pope Alexander VII as Auxiliary Bishop of Lviv and Titular Bishop of Nicopolis in Epiro. He served as Auxiliary Bishop of Lviv until his death in 1663. While bishop, he was the principal co-consecrator of Gaspar Trizenieski, Auxiliary Bishop of Gniezno (1661).

== See also ==
- Catholic Church in Ukraine

== External links and additional sources ==
- Cheney, David M. "Archdiocese of Lviv". Catholic-Hierarchy.org. (for Chronology of Bishops) ^{[self-published]}
- Chow, Gabriel. "Metropolitan Archdiocese of Lviv (Ukraine)". GCatholic.org. (for Chronology of Bishops) ^{[self-published]}
- Cheney, David M. "Nicopolis in Epiro (Titular See)". Catholic-Hierarchy.org. (for Chronology of Bishops) ^{[self-published]}

Catholic Church titles
Preceded by Andrzej Śrzedrzyński	Titular Bishop of Nicopolis in Epiro; 1657–1663	Succeeded by Jerzy Giedzieński
Preceded by	Auxiliary Bishop of Lviv; 1657–1663	Succeeded by
