= Kabarivtsi =

Rural locality in Ternopil Oblast, Ukraine

Kabarivtsi Кабарівці
- Location in Ternopil Oblast
- Coordinates: 49°43′3″N 25°8′22″E
- Country: Ukraine
- Oblast: Ternopil Oblast
- Raion: Ternopil Raion
- Hromada: Zboriv urban hromada
- Time zone: UTC+2 (EET)
  - Summer (DST): UTC+3 (EEST)
- Postal code: 47240

Kabarivtsi (Ukrainian: Кабарівці) is a village in the Zboriv urban hromada of the Ternopil Raion of Ternopil Oblast in Ukraine.

== History ==
The first written mention of the village was in 1598.

After the liquidation of the Zboriv Raion on 19 July 2020, the village became part of the Ternopil Raion.

== Religion ==
- Saint Paraskeva church (1836; brick).

== Notable residents ==
- Łukasz Baraniecki (1798–1858), Roman Catholic prelate, who served as a Metropolitan Archbishop of the Roman Catholic Archdiocese of Lviv

== Sources ==
- (in Ukrainian) Уніят В., Кабарівці // Ternopil Encyclopedic Dictionary: in 4 v. / editorial board: H. Yavorskyi and other, Ternopil: "Zbruch", 2005, V. 2: К—О, S. 5–6. — ISBN 966-528-199-2.
- "Kabarowce". Geographical Dictionary of the Kingdom of Poland (in Polish). 3. Warszawa: Kasa im. Józefa Mianowskiego. 1882. p. 647.
