= Łukasz Kaliński =

Ukrainian Roman Catholic prelate (1578–1634)

Most Reverend Łukasz Kaliński
- Auxiliary Bishop of Lviv; Titular Bishop of Nicopolis in Epiro
- Church: Catholic Church
- Diocese: Diocese of Lviv
- In office: 1626–1634

Personal details
- Born: 1578
- Died: 1634 (age 56) Lviv, Ukraine

Łukasz Kaliński (1578–1634) was a Catholic prelate who served as Auxiliary Bishop of Lviv (1626–1634) and Titular Bishop of Nicopolis in Epiro (1626–1634).

== Biography ==
Łukasz Kaliński was born in 1578. On 22 Jun 1626, he was appointed during the papacy of Pope Urban VIII as Auxiliary Bishop of Lviv and Titular Bishop of Nicopolis in Epiro. He served as Auxiliary Bishop of Lviv until his death in 1634.

== External links and additional sources ==
- Cheney, David M. "Archdiocese of Lviv". Catholic-Hierarchy.org. (for Chronology of Bishops) ^{[self-published]}
- Chow, Gabriel. "Metropolitan Archdiocese of Lviv (Ukraine)". GCatholic.org. (for Chronology of Bishops) ^{[self-published]}
- Cheney, David M. "Nicopolis in Epiro (Titular See)". Catholic-Hierarchy.org. (for Chronology of Bishops) ^{[self-published]}

Catholic Church titles
| Preceded by Tomasz Pirawski | Titular Bishop of Nicopolis in Epiro; 1626–1634 | Succeeded by Zachariasz Nowoszycki |
| Preceded by | Auxiliary Bishop of Lviv; 1626–1634 | Succeeded by |
