= Seweryn Morawski =

- Metropolitan Archbishop of Roman Catholic Archdiocese of Lviv
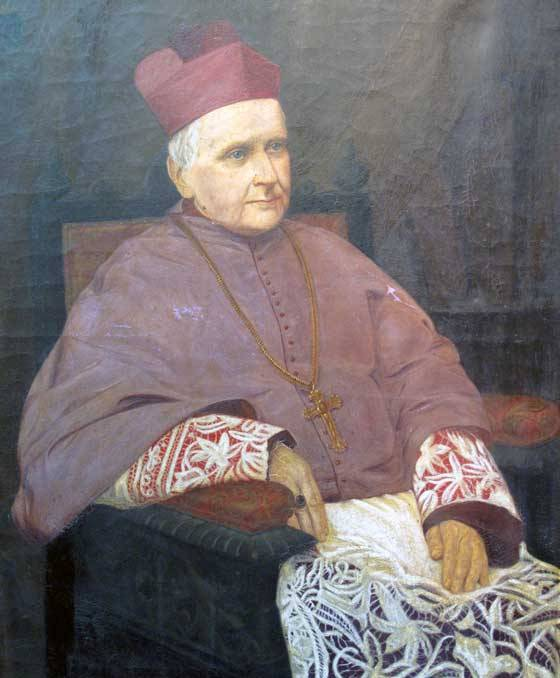
- Church: Roman Catholic Church
- Appointed: 27 March 1885
- Term ended: 2 May 1900
- Predecessor: Franciszek Ksawery Wierzchleyski
- Successor: Józef Bilczewski
- Other posts: Auxiliary Bishop of Lviv and Titular Bishop of Trapezopolis (1881–1885)

Orders
- Ordination: 31 August 1851 (Priest)
- Consecration: 26 June 1881 (Bishop) by Franciszek Ksawery Wierzchleyski

Personal details
- Born: Seweryn Tytus Morawski; 2 January 1819 Siltse, Austrian Empire (present day in Ternopil Raion, Ternopil Oblast, Ukraine)
- Died: 2 May 1900 (aged 81) Lviv, Austro-Hungarian Empire (present day in Ukraine)

Archbishop Seweryn Tytus Morawski (Ukrainian: Северин Тит Моравський; Polish: Seweryn Tytus Morawski; 2 January 1819 – 2 May 1900) was a Roman Catholic prelate, who served as an Auxiliary Bishop of the Roman Catholic Archdiocese of Lviv and a Titular Bishop of Trapezopolis from 13 May 1881 until 27 March 1885 and as the Metropolitan Archbishop of the same Archdiocese from 27 March 1885 until his death on 2 May 1900.

Family coat of arms Dąbrowa of Archbishop Seweryn Morawski

== Life ==
Archbishop Morawski was born in the szlachta Polish Roman Catholic family in the present day Ternopil Raion. After graduation of the gymnasium education, he subsequently joined Faculty of Philology of the University of Lviv (1834–1836), but left his studies, because of his father's death and his own illness. In 1837–1841 he graduated Faculty of Low at the same university and in 1841–1849 worked as a public servant in the Kingdom of Galicia and Lodomeria government. After that, Morawski joined Faculty of Theology of the University of Lviv and the Major Roman Catholic Theological Seminary in Lviv in 1849, was ordained as priest on August 31, 1851, for the Roman Catholic Archdiocese of Lviv, and completed his philosophical and theological studies in 1852.

After his ordination, he served as an assistant priest in the Holy Cross parish in Horodok (1852–1853) and in Cathedral Basilica of the Assumption, Lviv (1853–1855). Later he was appointed as a chancellor of the Metropolitan curia (1855–1881) and a dean of the Cathedral (1867–1875).

On May 13, 1881, he was appointed by the Pope Leo XIII as an Auxiliary Bishop of the Roman Catholic Archdiocese of Lviv and a Titular Bishop of Trapezopolis. On June 26, 1881, he was consecrated as bishop by Metropolitan Archbishop Franciszek Ksawery Wierzchleyski and other prelates of the Roman Catholic Church and the Armenian Catholic Church in the Cathedral Basilica of the Assumption, Lviv. In the same time he was nominated as a Vicar General of the Archdiocese.

On April 18, 1884, with the death of Metropolitan Franciszek Ksawery Wierzchleyski, he became a Vicar capitular of the Archdiocese and on March 27, 1885, was confirmed by the Holy See as a Metropolitan Archbishop.

Archbishop Morawski died, while in the office, on May 2, 1900, and was buried in the crypt of the seminarian chapel.

Catholic Church titles
Preceded by Antonio Maria Grasselli	Titular Bishop of Trapezopolis; 1881–1885	Succeeded by Francesco Sogaro
Preceded by Franciszek Ksawery Wierzchleyski	Metropolitan Archbishop of Roman Catholic Archdiocese of Lviv; 1885–1900	Succeeded by Józef Bilczewski
