= Primate of Galicia and Lodomeria =

Primate of Galicia and Lodomeria (German: Primas Unserer Königreiche Galizien und Lodomerien) was the Catholic Church historical title of honor that existed in the Kingdom of Galicia and Lodomeria (part of the Austrian Empire) from 1817 until 1858 for the Roman Catholic Archdiocese of Lviv (1817–1848) and the Ruthenian Catholic Archeparchy of Lviv (1848–1858). Under this Primate were three ecclesiastical provinces of the different Catholic traditions: Armenian, Latin and Ruthenian (present day Ukrainian) in Halychyna.

== History ==
The title was established without the consent of the Holy See on February 13, 1817 by the Austrian Emperor Francis I. The title was given to the Latin rite archbishops of Lviv. In 1848 Emperor Franz Joseph I transferred the title to the Greek Catholic Archbishops of Lviv. It ceased to be in use in 1858.

List of Primates of Galicia and Lodomeria
Andrzej Alojzy Ankwicz	1817 – 1833
Franz Xaver Luschin	1834 – 1835
František Pištěk	1836 – 1846
Václav Vilém Václavíček	1847 – 1848
Mykhajlo Levitsky	1848 – 1858

== Bibliography ==
- Bolesław Kumor (1977). "Obsada Metropolii Lwowskiej Obrządku Łacińskiego w latach 1772-1918" (PDF). Analecta Cracoviensia.
