= Stanisław Słomowski =

Polish Bishop and Cardinal

Stanisław Słomowski (died 22 September 1575 in Lwów) was a Polish Bishop and Cardinal of Roman Catholic Church.

Born into the Abdank noble family he was a Cardinal of the Roman Catholic Church, doctor of Laws, Canon of Poznań and Gniezno, Auxiliary Bishop of Krakow and Archbishop of Lviv.

He was the son of a very wealthy nobleman, Wincenty Słomowski and relative of Bishop Piotr Tomicki. He studied at the Academy of Cracow, and in Italy. From 1529 Canon of Gniezno and Poznań, and Kielce. In 1554 was appointed vicar general and oficjałem of Kraków and then on 14 February 1560 was appointed Auxiliary Bishop of Kraków and titular bishop of Laodicea in Phrygia.

In 1565 King Sigismund Augustus and Pope Pius IV, made him Archbishop of Lwów. He died on 22 September 1575 in Lwów.
