= Andrzej Śrzedrzyński =

Ukrainian prelate

Most Reverend Andrzej Śrzedrzyński
- Auxiliary Bishop of Lviv; Titular Bishop of Nicopolis in Epiro
- Church: Catholic Church
- Diocese: Diocese of Lviv
- In office: 1641–1654

Personal details
- Died: 1654

Andrzej Śrzedrzyński (died 1654) was a Roman Catholic prelate who served as Auxiliary Bishop of Lviv (1641–1654) and Titular Bishop of Nicopolis in Epiro (1641–1654).

== Biography ==
On 16 Sep 1641, Andrzej Śrzedrzyński was appointed during the papacy of Pope Urban VIII as Auxiliary Bishop of Lviv and Titular Bishop of Nicopolis in Epiro. He served as Auxiliary Bishop of Lviv until his death in 1654.

== External links and additional sources ==
- Cheney, David M. "Archdiocese of Lviv". Catholic-Hierarchy.org. (for Chronology of Bishops) ^{[self-published]}
- Chow, Gabriel. "Metropolitan Archdiocese of Lviv (Ukraine)". GCatholic.org. (for Chronology of Bishops) ^{[self-published]}
- Cheney, David M. "Nicopolis in Epiro (Titular See)". Catholic-Hierarchy.org. (for Chronology of Bishops) ^{[self-published]}

Catholic Church titles
Preceded by Zachariasz Nowoszycki	Titular Bishop of Nicopolis in Epiro; 1641–1654	Succeeded by Stefan Kazimierz Charbicki
Preceded by	Auxiliary Bishop of Lviv; 1641–1654	Succeeded by
