= Alois Josef Krakovský z Kolovrat =

Czech Roman Catholic archbishop

- Archbishop of Prague
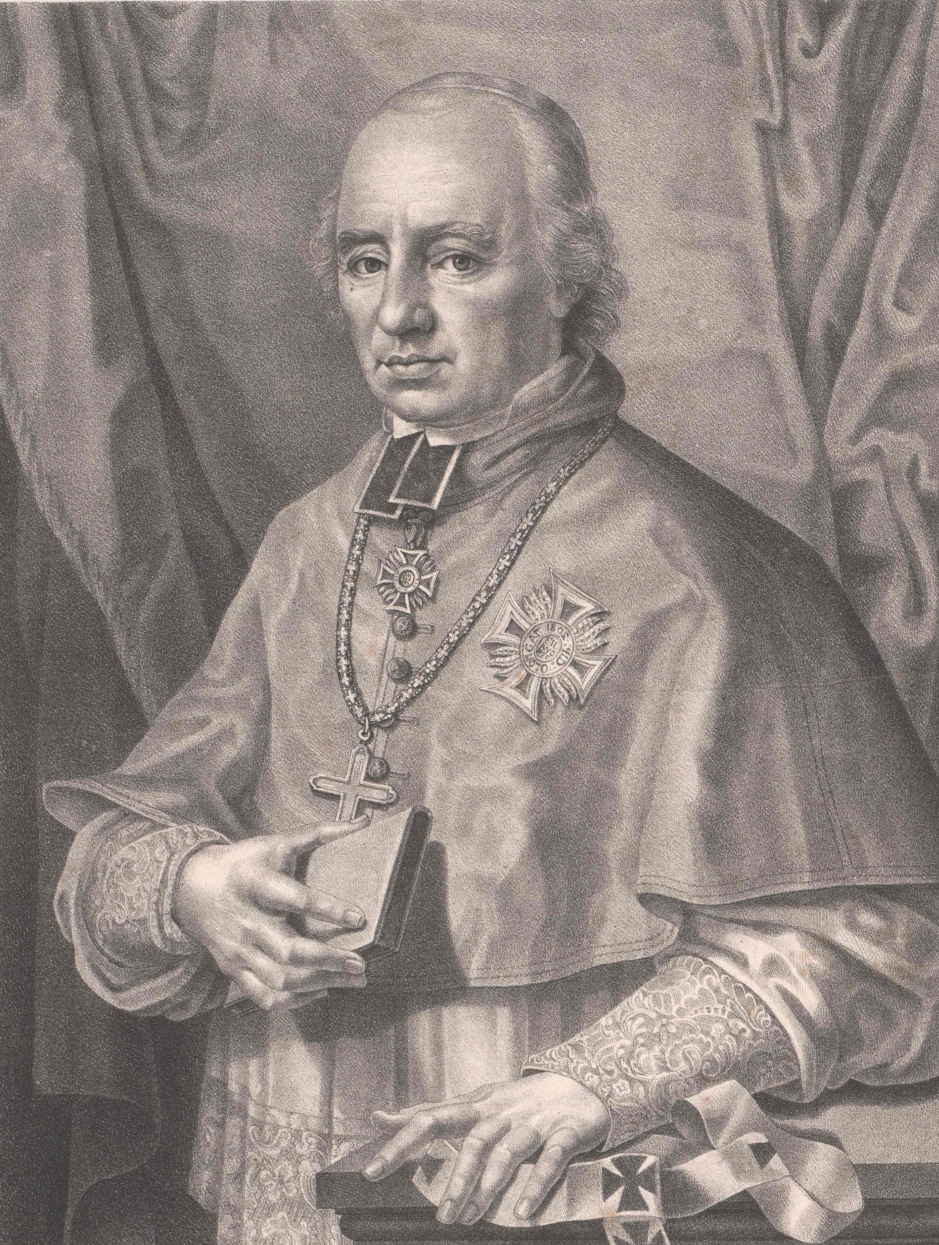
- Church: Catholic Church
- Archdiocese: Archdiocese of Prague
- In office: 28 February 1831 – 28 March 1833
- Predecessor: Václav Leopold Chlumčanský
- Successor: Andrzej Alojzy Ankwicz
- Previous posts: Bishop of Hradec Králové (1815-1831); Titular Bishop of Sarepta (1800-1815); Auxiliary Bishop of Olomouc (1800-1815)

Orders
- Ordination: 21 January 1781
- Consecration: 1 March 1801 by Antonín Theodor Colloredo-Waldsee

Personal details
- Born: 21 January 1759 Prague, Kingdom of Bohemia, Holy Roman Empire
- Died: 28 March 1833 (aged 74)

Alois Josef hrabě Krakovský z Kolovrat or Krakowský z Kolowrat (German: Alois Josef Krakovský von Kolowrat) (21 January 1759 – 28 March 1833) was the Roman Catholic archbishop of Prague from 1831 to 1833.

== Biography ==
Krakowsky was born in Prague in 1759. into the House of Kolowrat-Krakowsky, a branch of the House of Kolowrat, as the son of Count Prokop Kolowrat-Krakowsky (1718-1774) by his second wife, Countess Maria Anna Margaret Ogilvy (1725-1810). He was ordained a priest on his twenty-second birthday, 21 January 1781. In 1800, he was appointed the auxiliary bishop of Olomouc in Moravia, as well as titular bishop of Sarepta. It was fifteen years before he was appointed bishop of Hradec Králové. He remained in this capacity until 28 February 1831 when he was appointed archbishop of Prague. Exactly two years and a month later, he died at the age of 74. His remains are buried in St. Vitus Cathedral.

Preceded by Václav Leopold Chlumčanský	Archbishop of Prague; 1831–1833	Succeeded by Andrzej Alojzy Ankwicz
