= František Pištěk =

František de Paula Pištěk
- Metropolitan Archbishop of Roman Catholic Archdiocese of Lviv, Primate of Galicia and Lodomeria
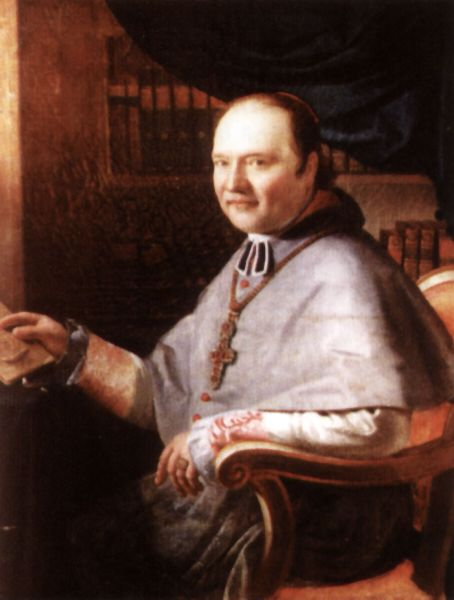
- Church: Roman Catholic Church
- Appointed: 1 February 1836
- Term ended: 1 February 1846
- Predecessor: Franz Xaver Luschin
- Successor: Václav Vilém Václavíček
- Other posts: Titular Bishop of Azotus and Auxiliary Bishop of Prague (1824–1832); Diocesan Bishop of Tarnów (1832–1836)

Orders
- Ordination: 21 August 1808 (Priest)
- Consecration: 14 November 1824 (Bishop) by Václav Leopold Chlumčanský

Personal details
- Born: František de Paula Pištěk; 6 April 1786 Prčice, Kingdom of Bohemia, Habsburg monarchy (present day in Central Bohemian Region, Czech Republic)
- Died: 1 February 1846 (aged 59) Lviv, Kingdom of Galicia and Lodomeria, Austrian Empire (present day in Ukraine)

Archbishop František de Paula Pištěk (Ukrainian: Франтішек де Паула Піштек; Polish: Franciszek de Paula Pisztek; 6 April 1786 – 1 February 1846) was a Roman Catholic prelate, who served as a Titular Bishop of Azotus and Auxiliary Bishop of Roman Catholic Archdiocese of Prague from 27 September 1824 until 24 February 1832, a Diocesan Bishop of the Roman Catholic Diocese of Tarnów from 24 February 1832 until 1 February 1836 and as the Metropolitan Archbishop of the Roman Catholic Archdiocese of Lviv and Primate of Galicia and Lodomeria from 1 February 1836 until his death on 1 February 1846.

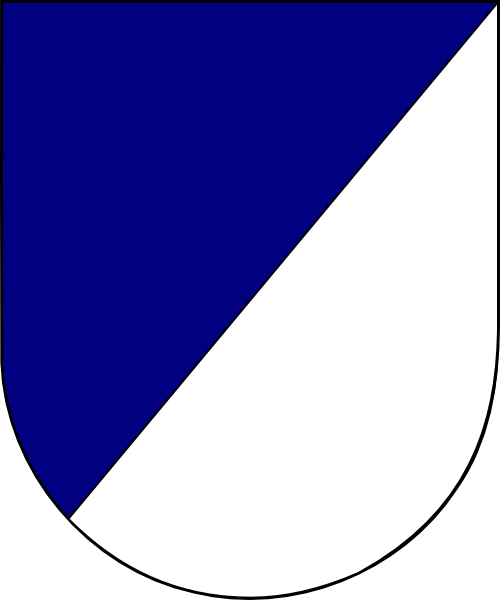
Coat of arms of Archbishop František de Paula Pištěk

== Life ==
Archbishop Pištěk was born in the peasant Bohemian Roman Catholic family of Vojtěch and Anna in the present day Central Bohemian Region. After graduation of the gymnasium education, he subsequently joined Faculty of Theology of the Charles University and the Major Roman Catholic Theological Seminary in Prague and was ordained as priest on August 21, 1808, for the Roman Catholic Archdiocese of Prague after completed his a philosophical and theological studies.

After his ordination, he served as an assistant priest, and later as a parish priest in the different parishes. In 1817 he was appointed as a dean in Přeštice and 6 years later, in 1823, became a canon of the Metropolitan Chapter of the Roman Catholic Archdiocese of Prague in the St. Vitus Cathedral.

On September 27, 1824, he was appointed by the Pope Leo XII as a Titular Bishop of Azotus and Auxiliary Bishop of Prague. On November 14, 1824, he was consecrated as a bishop by Metropolitan Archbishop Václav Leopold Chlumčanský and other prelates of the Roman Catholic Church. He also was a theologian and a spiritual writer, one among the founders of the "Časopis katolického duchovenstva" (Magazine of a Catholic Clergy) in 1828. In 1831 he also was appointed as a Vicar general of his Archdiocese.

On February 24, 1832, he was confirmed by the Holy See as a Diocesan Bishop of the Roman Catholic Diocese of Tarnów in a present-day Poland and 4 years later, on February 1, 1836, with the transfer of the previous Metropolitan to another see, he was confirmed by the Holy See as a Metropolitan Archbishop of the Roman Catholic Archdiocese of Lviv.

Archbishop Pištěk died, while in the office, on February 1, 1846, and was buried in the crypt of the Mary Gromnicza Church.

Catholic Church titles
| Preceded by Antônio Rodrigues de Aguiar | Titular Bishop of Azotus; 1824–1832 | Succeeded by Rafael Barišić |
| Preceded by Ferdinand Maria von Chotek | Bishop of Roman Catholic Diocese of Tarnów; 1832–1836 | Succeeded by Franciszek Ksawery Zachariasiewicz |
| Preceded by Franz Xaver Luschin | Metropolitan Archbishop of Roman Catholic Archdiocese of Lviv; 1836–1846 | Succeeded by Václav Vilém Václavíček (not takes effect) |
| Preceded by Franz Xaver Luschin | Primate of Galicia and Lodomeria; 1836–1846 | Succeeded by Václav Vilém Václavíček (not takes effect) |
