= Franz Xaver Luschin =

Catholic priest (1781–1854)

- Metropolitan Archbishop of Roman Catholic Archdiocese of Gorizia and Gradisca
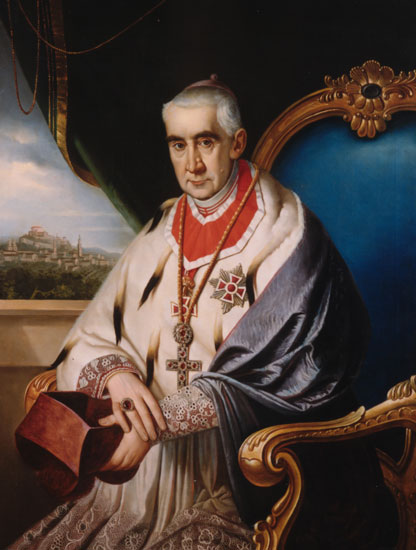
- Church: Roman Catholic Church
- Appointed: 6 April 1835
- Term ended: 2 May 1854
- Predecessor: Joseph Walland
- Successor: Andreas Gollmayr
- Other posts: Rector of University of Graz (1815–1816); Diocesan Bishop of Trento (1824–1834); Metropolitan Archbishop of Lviv and Primate of Galicia and Lodomeria (1834–1835)

Orders
- Ordination: 26 August 1804 (Priest)
- Consecration: 3 October 1824 (Bishop) by Augustin Johann Joseph Gruber

Personal details
- Born: Franz Xaver Luschin; 3 December 1781 Tainach, Duchy of Carinthia, Habsburg monarchy (present day in Völkermarkt District, Austria)
- Died: 2 May 1854 (aged 72) Gorizia, Austrian Empire (present day in Italy)

Archbishop Franz Xaver Luschin (Slovene: Franc Ksaver Lušin; 3 December 1781 – 2 May 1854) was a Roman Catholic prelate who served as a Diocesan Bishop of Trento from 24 May 1824 until 23 June 1834, a Metropolitan Archbishop of the Roman Catholic Archdiocese of Lviv and Primate of Galicia and Lodomeria from 23 June 1834 until 6 April 1835 and a Metropolitan Archbishop of Roman Catholic Archdiocese of Gorizia and Gradisca from 6 April 1835 his death on 2 May 1854.

== Life ==
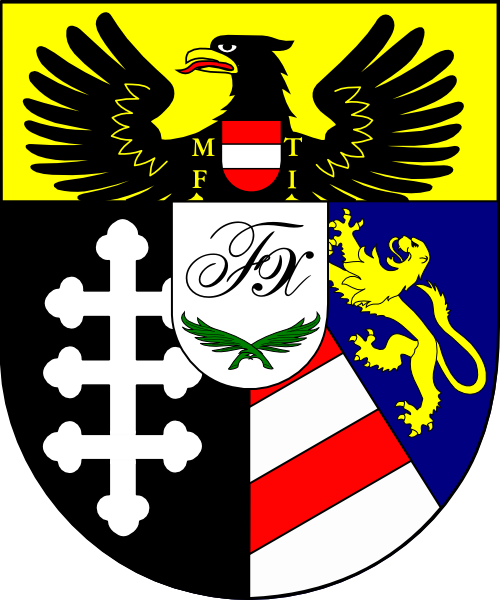
Coat of arms of Archbishop Franz Xaver Luschin

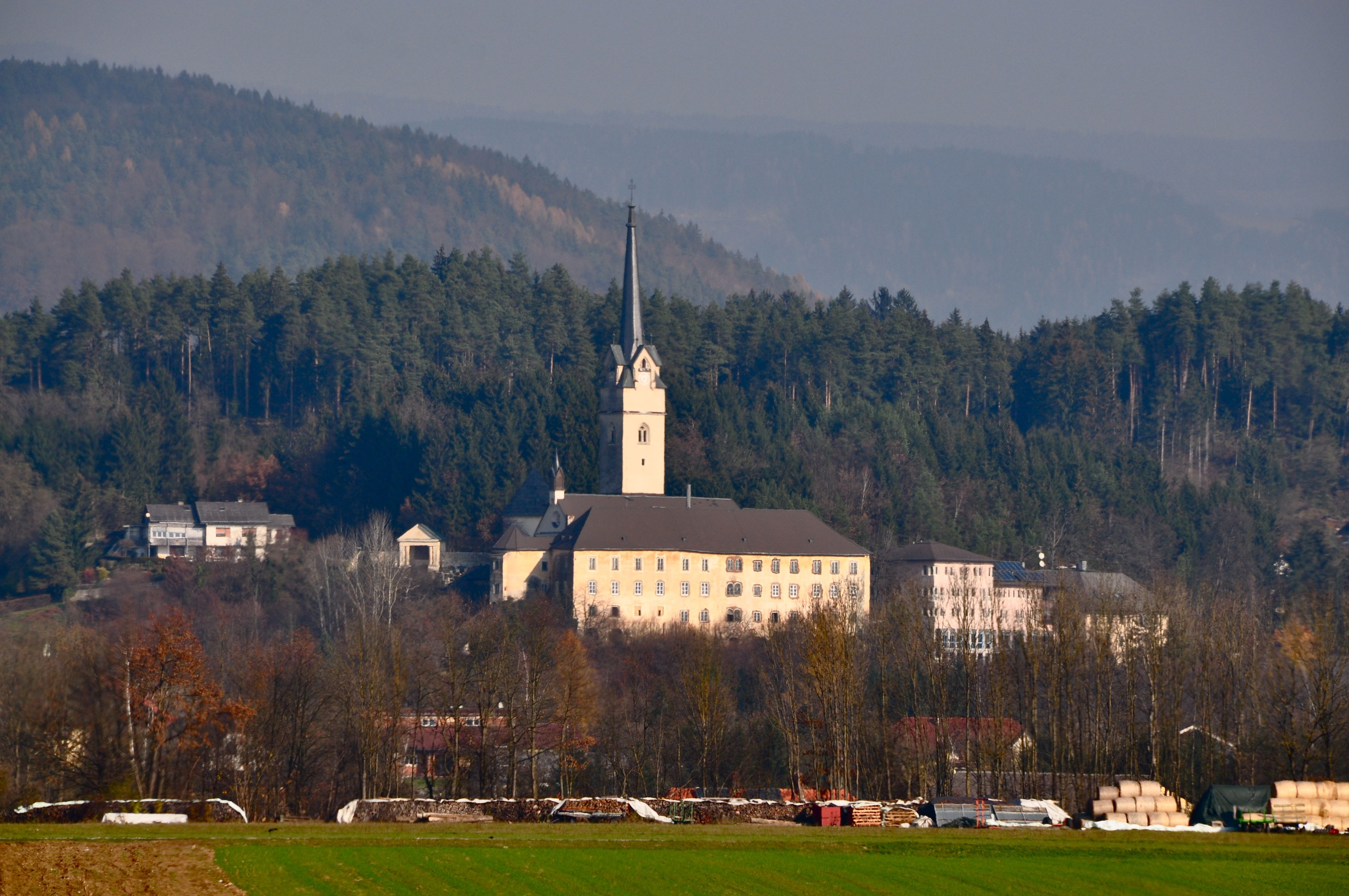
The village of Tainach, birthplace of Archbishop Franz Xaver Luschin

Archbishop Luschin was born in the wealthy peasant family of Carinthian Slovenes in Tainach (present day a part of town Völkermarkt). After graduation from gymnasium and lyceum education, he joined the Major Roman Catholic Theological Seminary in Klagenfurt and was ordained as priest on 26 August 1804, for the Roman Catholic Diocese of Gurk, after he had completed his philosophical and theological studies.

After his ordination, he served as an assistant priest in Klagenfurt from 1804 until 1808 and continued his studies in the University of Vienna earning a Doctor of Sacred Theology degree in 1813. He became a professor in a University of Graz and in 1815–1816, for one year, become a Rector. In 1820 he was appointed a referent in ecclesiastical affairs for the Tyrolean government in Innsbruck.

On 24 May 1824, he was confirmed by Pope Leo XII as a Diocesan Bishop of Roman Catholic Diocese of Trento, which had been vacant for six years. On 3 October 1824, he was consecrated as a bishop by Metropolitan Archbishop Augustin Johann Joseph Gruber without co-consecrators. Here he worked not only on the solution of an ecclesiastical questions but also on economic problems.

On 23 June 1834 he was confirmed by the Holy See as a Metropolitan Archbishop of the Roman Catholic Archdiocese of Lviv and the second Primate of Galicia and Lodomeria in present-day Ukraine, but he immediately realized that he would not be able to control the difficult situation, as there were strong tensions between the Latin-rite Catholics and the united Ruthenians. So he immediately asked to be transferred to another see, and a year later, on 6 April 1835, he was confirmed by the Holy See as a Metropolitan Archbishop of the vacant Roman Catholic Archdiocese of Gorizia and Gradisca.

Archbishop Luschin died while in office on 2 May 1854 in Gorizia, Princely County of Gorizia and Gradisca, and was buried in the crypt of the local metropolitan chapel.

Catholic Church titles
Preceded by Emanuel Maria Thun	Diocesan Bishop of Roman Catholic Diocese of Trento; 1824–1834	Succeeded by Johann Nepomuk von Tschiderer zu Gleifheim
Preceded by Andrzej Alojzy Ankwicz	Metropolitan Archbishop of Roman Catholic Archdiocese of Lviv; 1834–1835	Succeeded by František Pištěk
Preceded by Andrzej Alojzy Ankwicz	Primate of Galicia and Lodomeria; 1834–1835	Succeeded by František Pištěk
Preceded by Joseph Walland	Metropolitan Archbishop of Roman Catholic Archdiocese of Gorizia and Gradisca; 1835–1854	Succeeded by Andreas Gollmayr
Educational offices
Preceded by Claudius von Scherer	Rector of University of Graz; 1815–1816	Succeeded by Franz Kudler
