= Trapezopolis =

City of ancient Caria

Coordinates: 37°51′21″N 28°55′56″E

Trapezopolis (Ancient Greek: Τραπεζόπολις) or Trapezoupolis (Τραπεζούπολις) was a city of ancient Caria, and later in the late Roman province of Phrygia Pacatiana Prima.

== History ==
At an earlier stage, Trapezopolis was part of Caria, as reported by Ptolemy and Pliny the Elder, but by the time of Socrates of Constantinople, Hierocles and the various Notitiae Episcopatuum it belonged to Phrygia Pacatiana.

Its site is located near Boli in Asiatic Turkey.

== Episcopal seat ==
The bishopric of Trapezopolis was a suffragan of Laodicea, the capital and metropolitan seat of the province of Phrygia Pacatiana Prima. It is mentioned as a residential see until the 13th century and is now included in the Catholic Church's list of titular seats.

Le Quien names six bishops of Trapezopolis:

- Hierophilius, prior to 400;
- Asclepiades, present at the Council of Ephesus (431);
- John, at the Council of Chalcedon (451);
- Eugenius, at the Trullan Council (692);
- Zacharias, at Second Council of Nicaea (787);
- Leo, at the Fourth Council of Constantinople (Roman Catholic) (879).
