= Andrzej Alojzy Ankwicz =

Polish Roman Catholic archbishop

His Excellency Andrzej Alojzy Ankwicz
- Archbishop of Prague
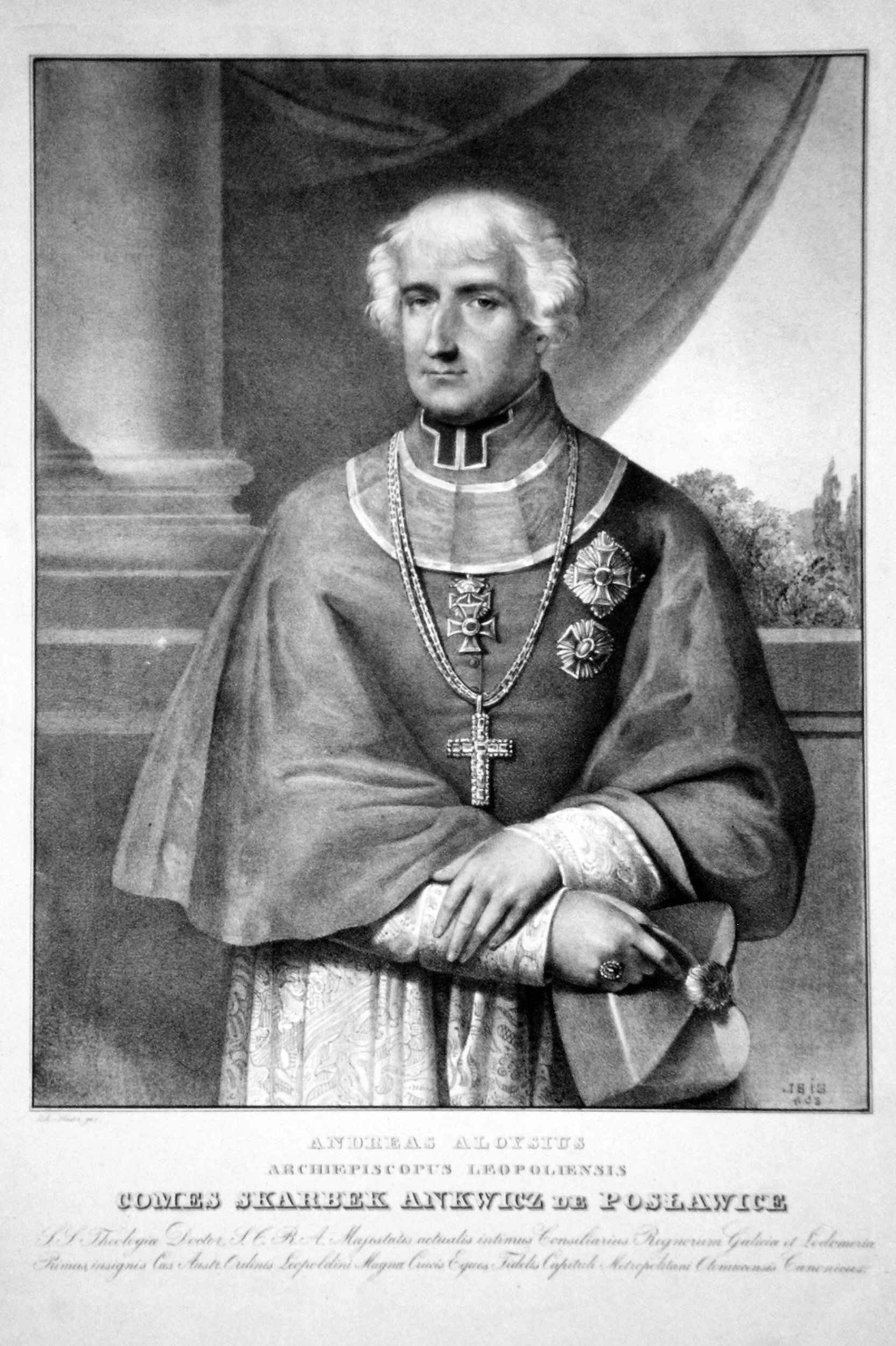
- Church: Roman Catholic
- Archdiocese: Prague
- Appointed: 31 May 1833
- In office: 1833–1838
- Predecessor: Alois Josef Krakovský z Kolovrat
- Successor: Alois Josef, Freiherr von Schrenk
- Previous post: Archbishop of Lviv (1815–1833)

Orders
- Ordination: 2 September 1810
- Consecration: 15 August 1815 by Maria-Thaddeus von Trauttmansdorf Wiensberg

Personal details
- Born: 17 June 1777 Kraków, Kraków Voivodeship, Kingdom of Poland, Polish–Lithuanian Commonwealth
- Died: 26 March 1838 (aged 60) Prague, Bohemia, Austrian Empire

Andrzej Alojzy Ankwicz (Polish pronunciation: [ˈandʐɛj aˈlɔjzɨ ˈaŋkfit͡ʂ]; Czech: Ondřej Alois Ankwicz ze Skarbek–Poslawice; German: Andreas Alois Ankwicz von Skarbek-Poslawice; 22 June 1777 – 26 March 1838) was the Roman Catholic archbishop of Lwów (Lviv) in 1815–1833 and archbishop of Prague in 1833–1838.

== Life ==
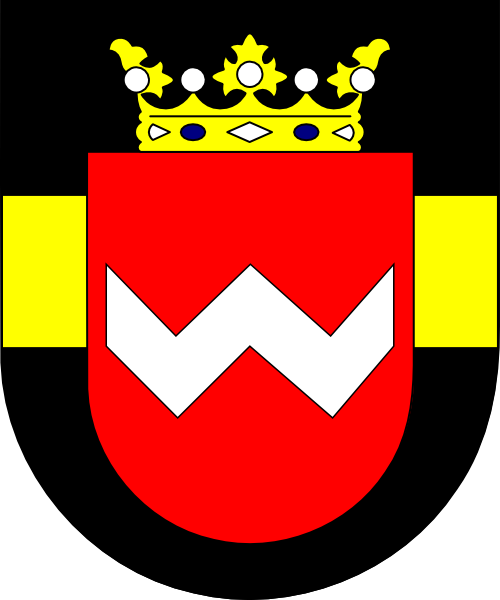
Coat of arms of Archbishop A. A. Ankwicz

Ankwicz was born in 1777 in Kraków, Polish Crown. Studied in his native city and the in Vienna; ordained a priest on 2 September 1810. Then became a canon of the Olomouc Cathedral chapter and was elected to the position of rector of the Theological faculty of the Olomouc University.

In 1815, he was appointed and ordained Archbishop of Lviv (then the metropolis of the Galicia-Lodomeria, a crown land of the Austrian Empire, now in Ukraine). He remained in this capacity for 18 years until 30 September 1833.

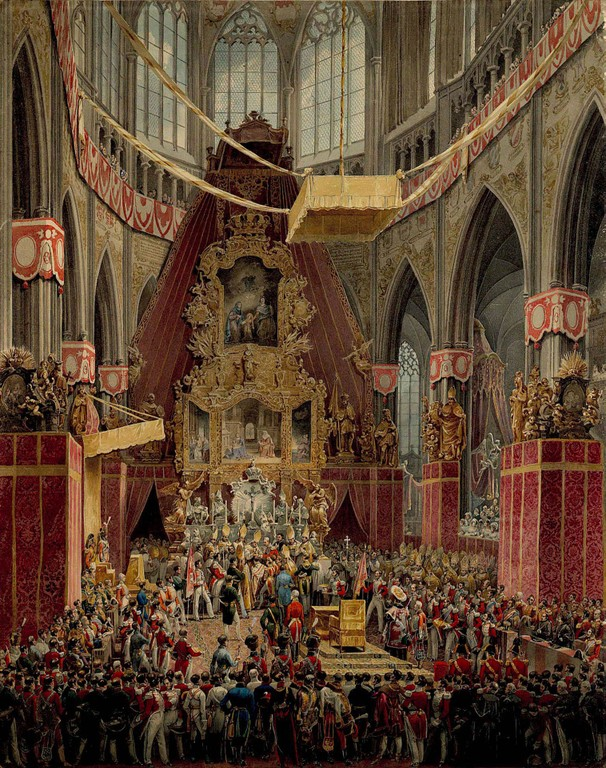
Coronation of Emperor Ferdinand I as Bohemian King in the Cathedral in Prague. Watercolor by Eduard Gurk, 1836. This coronation, the last of its kind ever, was led by Archbishop Ankwicz.

Subsequently, he was sent to another then-Austrian land, Bohemia, to be appointed as the 24th Archbishop of Prague (and at the same time 13th Primas Bohemiae). With this honorary title he had right to coronate Bohemian kings which he indeed exercised on 7 September 1836 when crowned Ferdinand V as the King of Bohemia in the St. Vitus Cathedral in Prague – it proved to be the last Bohemian coronation ever.

Died at the age of 60 years on 26 March 1838 and was buried in the Saxon (or St Adalbert′s) chapel of the choir of St. Vitus Cathedral, to be succeeded in his archbishopric by Alois Josef Schrenk.

Catholic Church titles
Preceded by Kajetan Ignacy Kicki	Metropolitan Archbishop of Roman Catholic Archdiocese of Lviv; 1815–1833	Succeeded by Franz Xaver Luschin
New title	Primate of Galicia and Lodomeria; 1817–1833	Succeeded by Franz Xaver Luschin
Preceded by Alois Jozef Krakowski von Kolowrat	Metropolitan Archbishop of Roman Catholic Archdiocese of Prague; 1833–1838	Succeeded by Alois Josef, Freiherr von Schrenk
