= Franciszek Ksawery Wierzchleyski =

Polish Catholic archbishop (1803–1884)

- Metropolitan Archbishop of Roman Catholic Archdiocese of Lviv
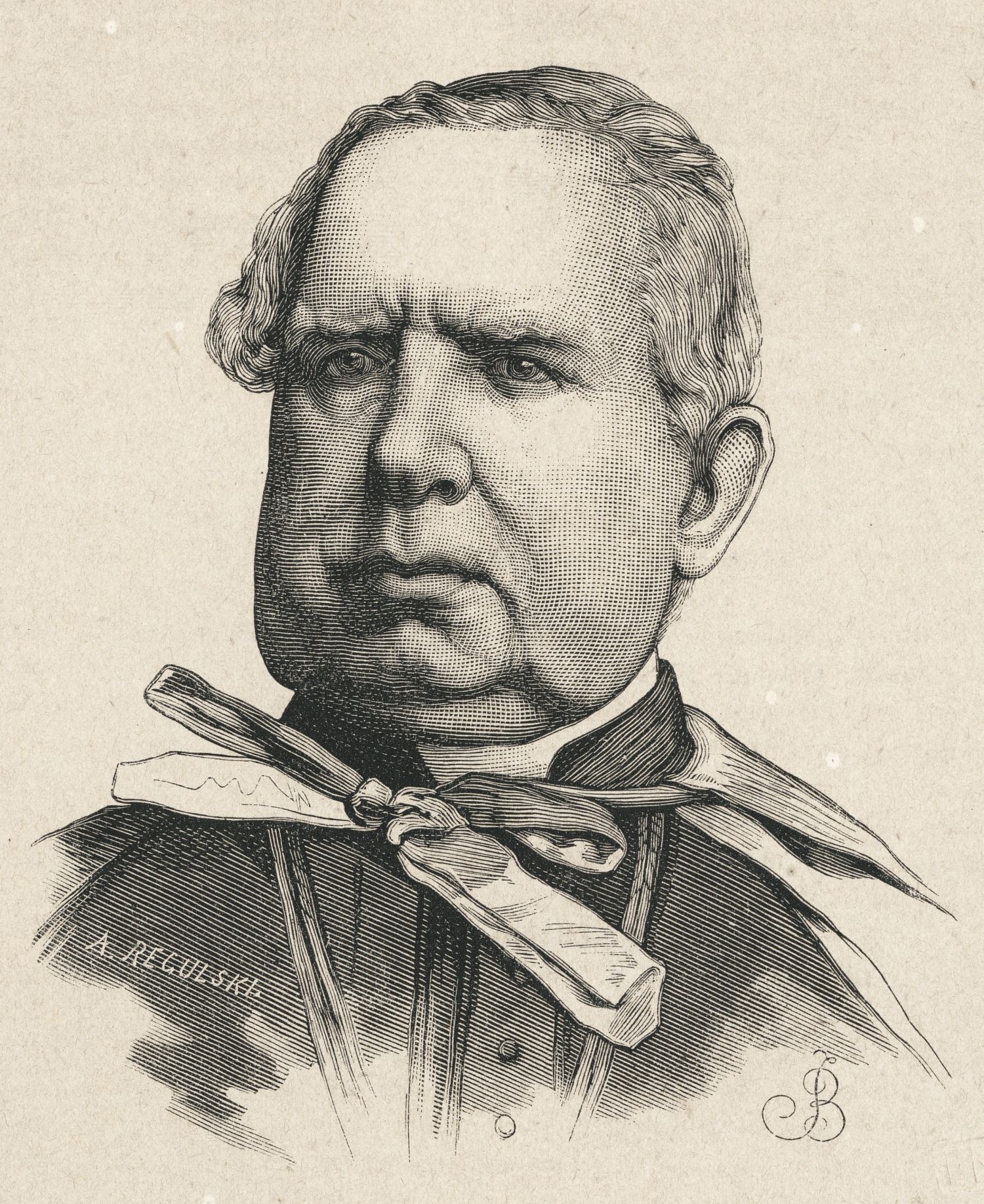
- Church: Roman Catholic Church
- Appointed: 23 March 1860
- Term ended: 17 April 1884
- Predecessor: Łukasz Baraniecki
- Successor: Seweryn Morawski
- Other post: Diocesan Bishop of Przemyśl (1846–1860)

Orders
- Ordination: 25 June 1826 (Priest)
- Consecration: 4 October 1846 (Bishop) by Samuel Cyryl Stefanowicz

Personal details
- Born: Franciszek Ksawery Wierzchleyski; 1 December 1803 Poręba Wielka, Habsburg monarchy (present day in Poland)
- Died: 17 April 1884 (aged 80) Lviv, Austro-Hungarian Empire (present day in Ukraine)

Archbishop Franciszek Ksawery Wierzchleyski (Ukrainian: Франциск Ксаверій Вежхлейський; Polish: Franciszek Ksawery Wierzchleyski; 1 December 1803 – 17 April 1884) was a Roman Catholic prelate, who served as a Diocesan Bishop of the Roman Catholic Diocese of Przemyśl from 27 July 1846 until 23 March 1860 and as the Metropolitan Archbishop of the Roman Catholic Archdiocese of Lviv from 23 March 1860 until his death on 17 April 1884.

Family coat of arms Berszten II of Archbishop Wierzchleyski

== Life ==
Archbishop Wierzchleyski was born in the szlachta Polish Roman Catholic family in the present day South-Western Poland. After graduation from the gymnasium education, he subsequently joined Faculty of Philosophy at the University of Lviv, but left his studies, because of his decision to become a priest. After that, Wierzchleyski joined Faculty of Theology at the University of Vienna and was ordained as priest on June 25, 1826, and completed his philosophical and theological studies, but without Doctorate in the Theology, because of his appointing as a professor of the Holy Scripture in the Franciscan Major Seminary in Kalwaria Zebrzydowska in 1827.

After his ordination, he served as a parish priest in the Our Lady Nativity parish in Holohory (1834–1845) and a dean of the Zolochiv deanery. From 1845 until 1846 he served as a collaborator of the Metropolitan curia.

On July 27, 1846, he was confirmed by the Pope Pius IX as a Dicesan Bishop of the Roman Catholic Diocese of Przemyśl. On October 4, 1846, he was consecrated as bishop by Armenian Catholic Archbishop Samuel Cyryl Stefanowicz and other prelates of the Roman Catholic Church and the Ukrainian Greek-Catholic Church in the Cathedral Basilica of the Assumption, Lviv.

On December 6, 1859, with the death of the previous Metropolitan, he was selected and on March 23, 1860, was confirmed by the Holy See as a Metropolitan Archbishop of the Roman Catholic Archdiocese of Lviv. In 1869–1870 he participated in the First Vatican Council in Rome.

Archbishop Wierzchleyski died, while in the office, on April 17, 1884, and was buried in the crypt of the Cathedral Basilica.

Catholic Church titles
Preceded by Franciszek Ksawery Zachariasiewicz	Bishop of Roman Catholic Diocese of Przemyśl; 1846–1860	Succeeded by Adam Jasiński
Preceded by Łukasz Baraniecki	Metropolitan Archbishop of Roman Catholic Archdiocese of Lviv; 1860–1884	Succeeded by Seweryn Morawski
