= Václav Vilém Václavíček =

Czech Roman Catholic priest and theological writer

Canon Václav Vilém Václavíček
- Metropolitan Archbishop-elect of Roman Catholic Archdiocese of Lviv, Primate of Galicia and Lodomeria
- Church: Roman Catholic Church
- Appointed: 17 December 1847
- Term ended: 29 May 1848
- Predecessor: František Pištěk
- Successor: Łukasz Baraniecki
- Other post: Rector of Charles University in Prague (1838)

Orders
- Ordination: 19 November 1809 (Priest)
- Consecration: never consecrated

Personal details
- Born: Václav Vilém Václavíček; 19 December 1788 Choustník, Habsburg monarchy (present day in South Bohemian Region, Czech Republic)
- Died: 19 September 1862 (aged 73) Prague, Austrian Empire (present day in Czech Republic)

Canon Václav Vilém Václavíček (Ukrainian: Вацлав Вілем Вацлавічек; Polish: Wacław Wilhelm Wacławiczek; 19 December 1788 – 19 September 1862) was a Czech Roman Catholic priest and theological writer, who a short time served as a Metropolitan Archbishop-elect of the Roman Catholic Archdiocese of Lviv and Primate of Galicia and Lodomeria from 17 December 1847 until his resignation on 29 May 1848. Also he held a position of the Rector of Charles University in Prague (1838).

== Life ==
Václavíček was born in the Czech Roman Catholic family of estate administrator Josef Ignác Václavíček in Choustník in southern Bohemia. After graduation of the gymnasium education, he subsequently joined Faculty of Theology of the Charles University and the Major Roman Catholic Theological Seminary in Prague. He was ordained as priest on November 19, 1809, when completed of the philosophical and theological studies with Doctor of Theology degree.

After his ordination, he served as an assistant priest, and later as a parish priest in the different parishes. In 1829 he was appointed as a canon of the Metropolitan Chapter of the Roman Catholic Archdiocese of Prague and simultaneously as a Czech language preacher in the St. Vitus Cathedral. In 1831 he became a Dean of Faculty of Theology in the Charles University and in 1838, for one year, become a Rector. Also from 1837 until 1848 he was a Dean of the Metropolitan Chapter. This services he fulfilled until his archbishop's nomination.

On 17 December 1847, he was appointed as a Metropolitan Archbishop of Roman Catholic Archdiocese of Lviv and a Primate of Galicia and Lodomeria, but shortly resigned, before the episcopal ordination on 29 May 1848, justified this with the resistance of the Polish population living in the Archdiocese. From November 1848 he was a provost of the Prague cathedral chapter.

He also was a theologian and a spiritual writer, one among the founders of the "Časopis katolického duchovenstva" (Magazine of a Catholic Clergy) and it chief redactor in 1831–1832.

Dr. Canon Václavíček died on 19 September 1862 in Prague.

Catholic Church titles
Preceded by František Pištěk	Metropolitan Archbishop of Roman Catholic Archdiocese of Lviv (never consecrated); 1847–1848	Succeeded by Łukasz Baraniecki
Preceded by František Pištěk	Primate of Galicia and Lodomeria; 1847–1848	Succeeded by Mykhajlo Levitsky
Educational offices
Preceded by Karel Václav Wolfram	Rector of Charles University in Prague; 1838	Succeeded by Antonín Jan Jungmann
