= Church of the Presentation, Lviv =

Coordinates: 49°50′40″N 24°02′12″E

Church of the Presentation
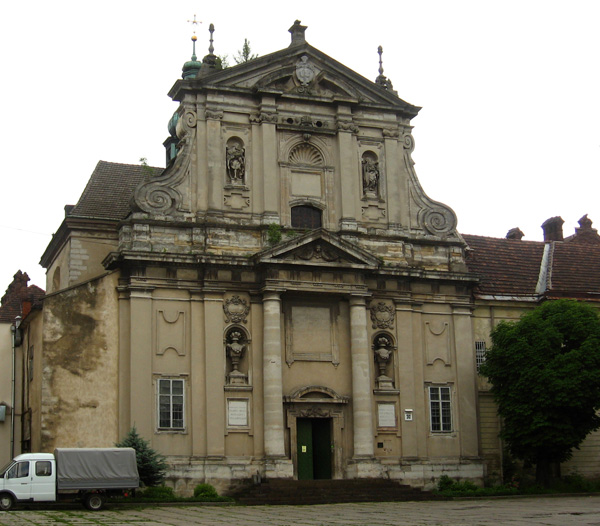
- Presentation Church in Lviv
- Church of the Presentation

Immovable Monument of Local Significance of Ukraine
- Official name: Комплекс монастиря сестер кармеліток босих: келії з каплицею (Monastery complex of the Discalced Carmelite Sisters: cells with the chapel)
- Type: Architecture
- Reference no.: 4155-Лв

The Carmelite Convent (Ukrainian: Церква Стрітення Господнього, romanized: Tserkva Stritennia Hospodnoho) was established in Lviv by Jakub Sobieski. Its construction, commenced in 1642, was greatly delayed by the events of the Deluge. The Carmelites departed from the nunnery in 1792. It was later used as a metrology office. The Ukrainian Greek Catholic Church recently reconsecrated the church to Christian worship and dedicated it to the Presentation of Our Lord.

== History ==
The church was constructed in 1642 by Italian architects whom had been inspired by churches in Rome. It was originally constructed as a monastery for the Barefoot Carmelites. When they left in 1792, the building was used as a Roman Catholic Church seminary. In 1940, under communist rule, the Ukrainian Soviet Socialist Republic utilised it as a hospital, then army barracks before finally making it a meteorology office. After the fall of communism in Ukraine, the Ukrainian Greek Catholic Church reconsecrated it for Christian worship in 1998. However, ownership largely remained in the Ukrainian state. In 2001, following a visit by Pope John Paul II, it was agreed that the church would be handed over to the Roman Catholic Church. However this mostly did not occur as the state only handed over 30% of the complex to the Catholics. In 2016, the Roman Catholic congregation asked the Vatican Secretariat of State to expedite the handover to them.

Until 2018, the Greek Catholics and Roman Catholics shared worship in the church. Due to a disagreement over theology and religious practices that year, the Greek Catholic congregation changed the locks and forced the Roman Catholics to worship in a nearby chapel that had been handed over in the deal with the Pope. The Greek Catholic Lviv Metropolitan Bishop recalled the Greek Catholic priest and ordered that the building be given to the Roman Catholics in 2022. By this time, it was noted that a lack of maintenance had caused damage to the building and a number of religious frescos from water damage.
