= Hart-Purgstall =

- Former municipality
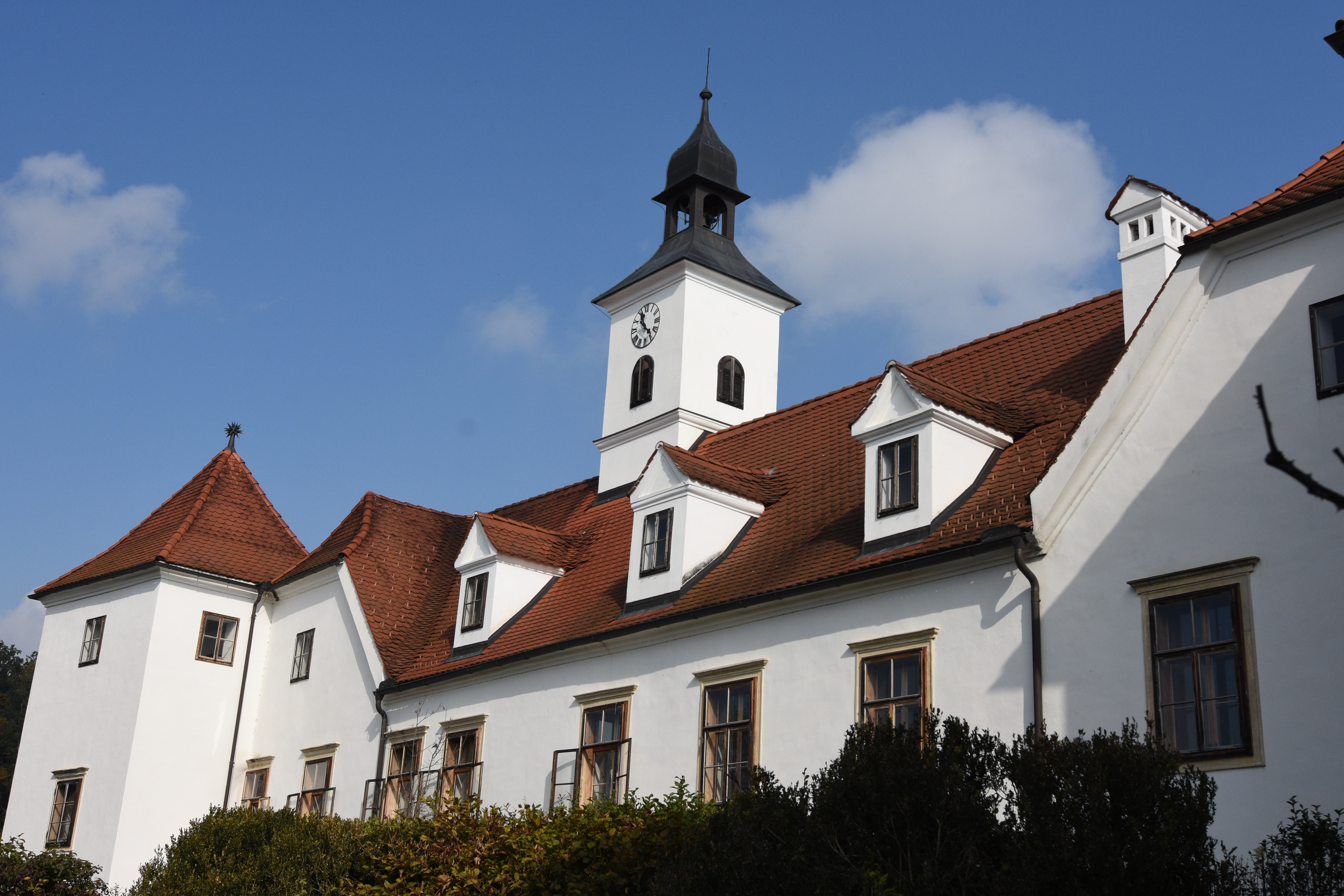
- Dornhofen Castle in Hart

- Coat of arms

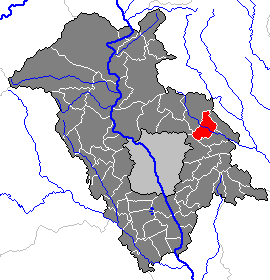
- Location within Graz-Umgebung district

- Location within Austria
- Coordinates: 47°07′21″N 15°34′45″E
- Country: Austria
- State: Styria
- District: Graz-Umgebung

Area
  - Total: 15.84 km^{2} (6.12 sq mi)
- Elevation: 426 m (1,398 ft)

Population (1 January 2016)
  - Total: 1,593
  - Density: 100.6/km^{2} (260.5/sq mi)
- Time zone: UTC+1 (CET)
  - Summer (DST): UTC+2 (CEST)
- Postal code: 8063
- Area code: 03117
- Vehicle registration: GU
- Website: www.purgstall-eggersdorf. steiermark.at

Hart-Purgstall is a former municipality in the district of Graz-Umgebung in the Austrian state of Styria. Since the 2015 Styria municipal structural reform, it is part of the municipality Eggersdorf bei Graz.

== Population ==
Historical population
Year	Pop.	±%
1869	992	—
1880	978	−1.4%
1890	1,037	+6.0%
1900	1,026	−1.1%
1910	955	−6.9%
1923	946	−0.9%
1934	1,037	+9.6%
1939	1,026	−1.1%
1951	1,046	+1.9%
1961	1,026	−1.9%
1971	1,119	+9.1%
1981	1,243	+11.1%
1991	1,515	+21.9%
2001	1,653	+9.1%
