= Petersdorf =

Petersdorf may refer to the following places:

- in Germany:
  - Petersdorf, Bavaria, in the district Aichach-Friedberg, Bavaria
  - Petersdorf, Mecklenburg-Vorpommern, in the district Mecklenburg-Strelitz, Mecklenburg-Vorpommern
  - Petersdorf, Thuringia, in the district of Nordhausen, Thuringia
  - Petersdorf, Fehmarn, on the island of Fehmarn, Schleswig-Holstein
- In Austria:
  - Petersdorf, Austria, in Styria
- In the Czech Republic:
  - Vražné, in Moravian-Silesian Region
- In Poland:
  - Piechowice, in Lower Silesian Voivodeship
- In Romania:
  - Petreşti village, Sebeș, Alba County
  - Petriş village, Cetate Commune, Bistriţa-Năsăud County
