= Brodingberg =

- Former municipality
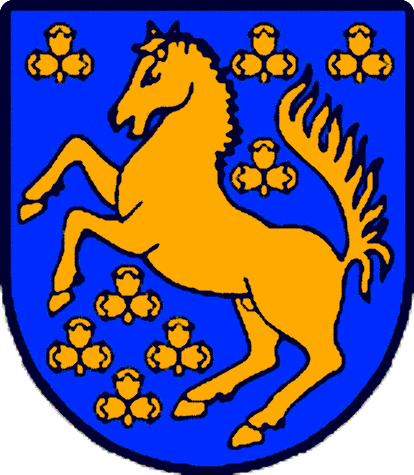
- Coat of arms

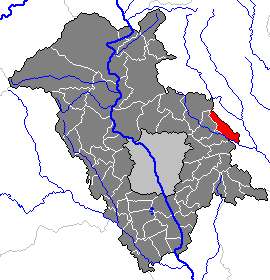
- Location within Graz-Umgebung district

- Location within Austria
- Coordinates: 47°06′43″N 15°38′54″E
- Country: Austria
- State: Styria
- District: Graz-Umgebung

Area
  - Total: 12.84 km^{2} (4.96 sq mi)
- Elevation: 390 m (1,280 ft)

Population (1 January 2016)
  - Total: 1,277
  - Density: 99.45/km^{2} (257.6/sq mi)
- Time zone: UTC+1 (CET)
  - Summer (DST): UTC+2 (CEST)
- Postal code: 8063
- Area code: 03117
- Vehicle registration: GU
- Website: brodingberg.gv.at

Brodingberg is a former municipality in the district of Graz-Umgebung in the Austrian state of Styria. Since the 2015 Styria municipal structural reform, it is part of the municipality Eggersdorf bei Graz.

== Geography ==
Brodingberg lies about 15 km east of Graz on the Rabnitzbach, a tributary of the Raab.
