= Edelsgrub =

- Former municipality
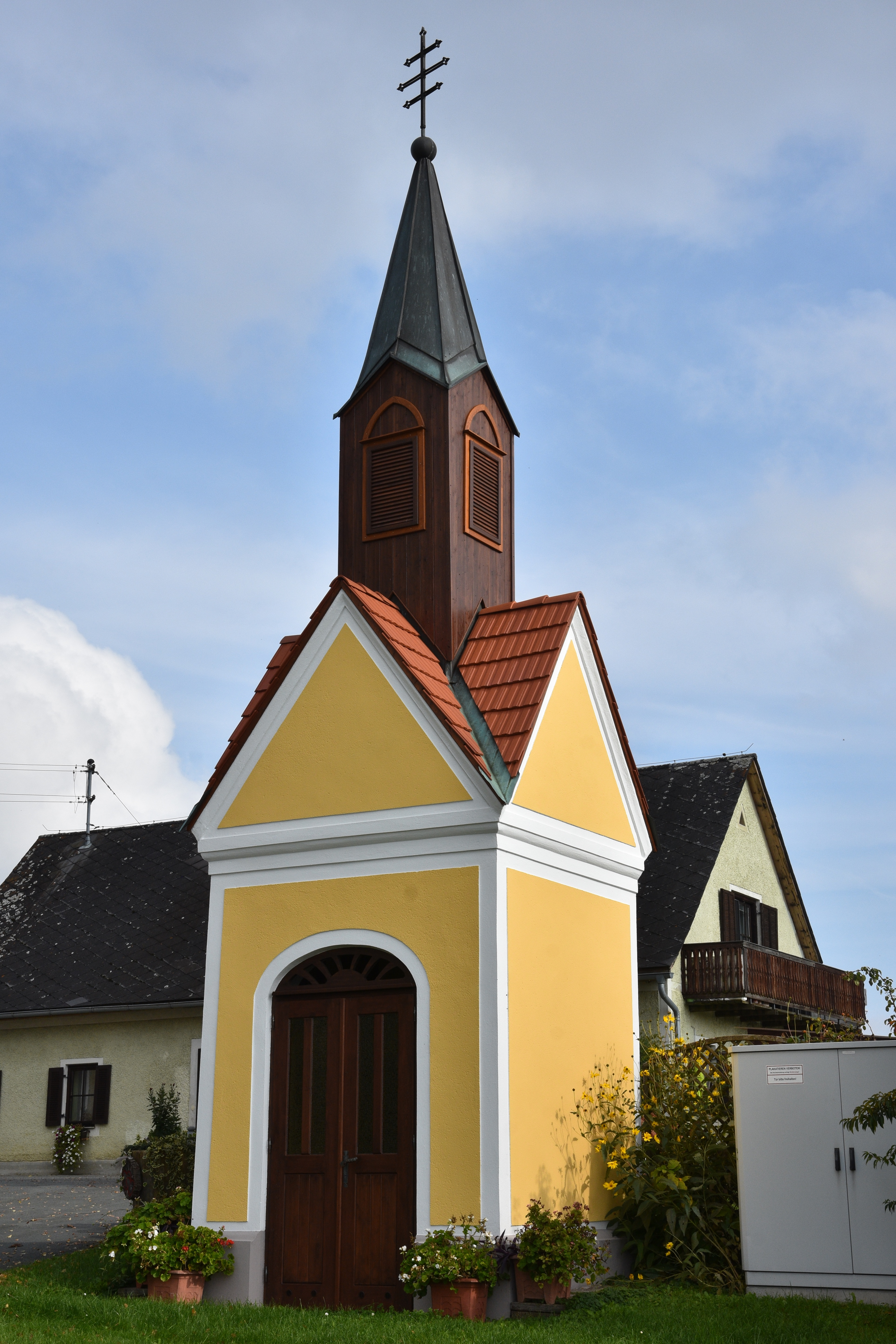
- Chapel in Edelsgrub

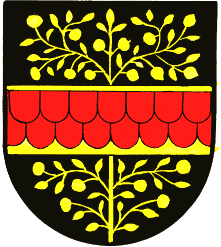
- Coat of arms

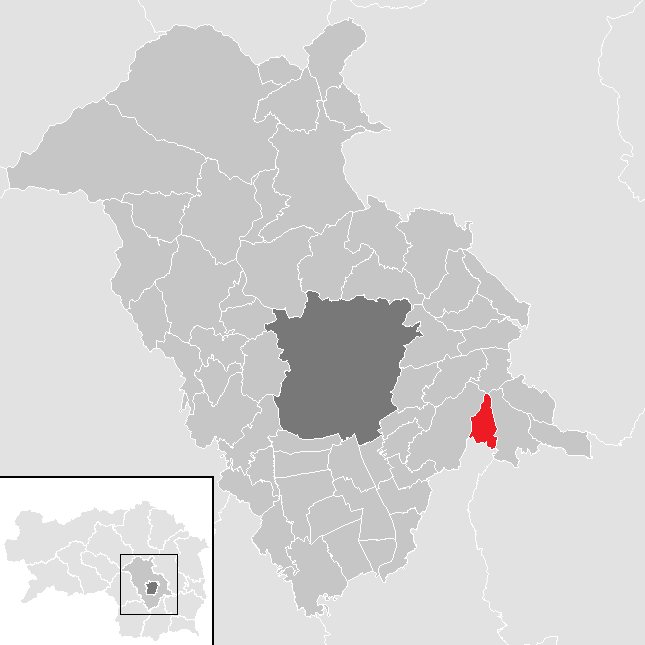
- Location within Graz-Umgebung district

- Location within Austria
- Coordinates: 47°2′0″N 15°36′0″E
- Country: Austria
- State: Styria
- District: Graz-Umgebung

Area
  - Total: 7.12 km^{2} (2.75 sq mi)
- Elevation: 460 m (1,510 ft)

Population (1 January 2016)
  - Total: 707
  - Density: 99.3/km^{2} (257/sq mi)
- Time zone: UTC+1 (CET)
  - Summer (DST): UTC+2 (CEST)
- Postal code: 8302
- Area code: 03133
- Vehicle registration: GU
- Website: www.edelsgrub.at

Edelsgrub is a former municipality in the district of Graz-Umgebung in the Austrian state of Styria. Since the 2015 Styria municipal structural reform, it is part of the municipality Nestelbach bei Graz.

== Geography ==
Edelsgrub lies about 10 km east of Graz.
