= Langegg bei Graz =

- Former municipality
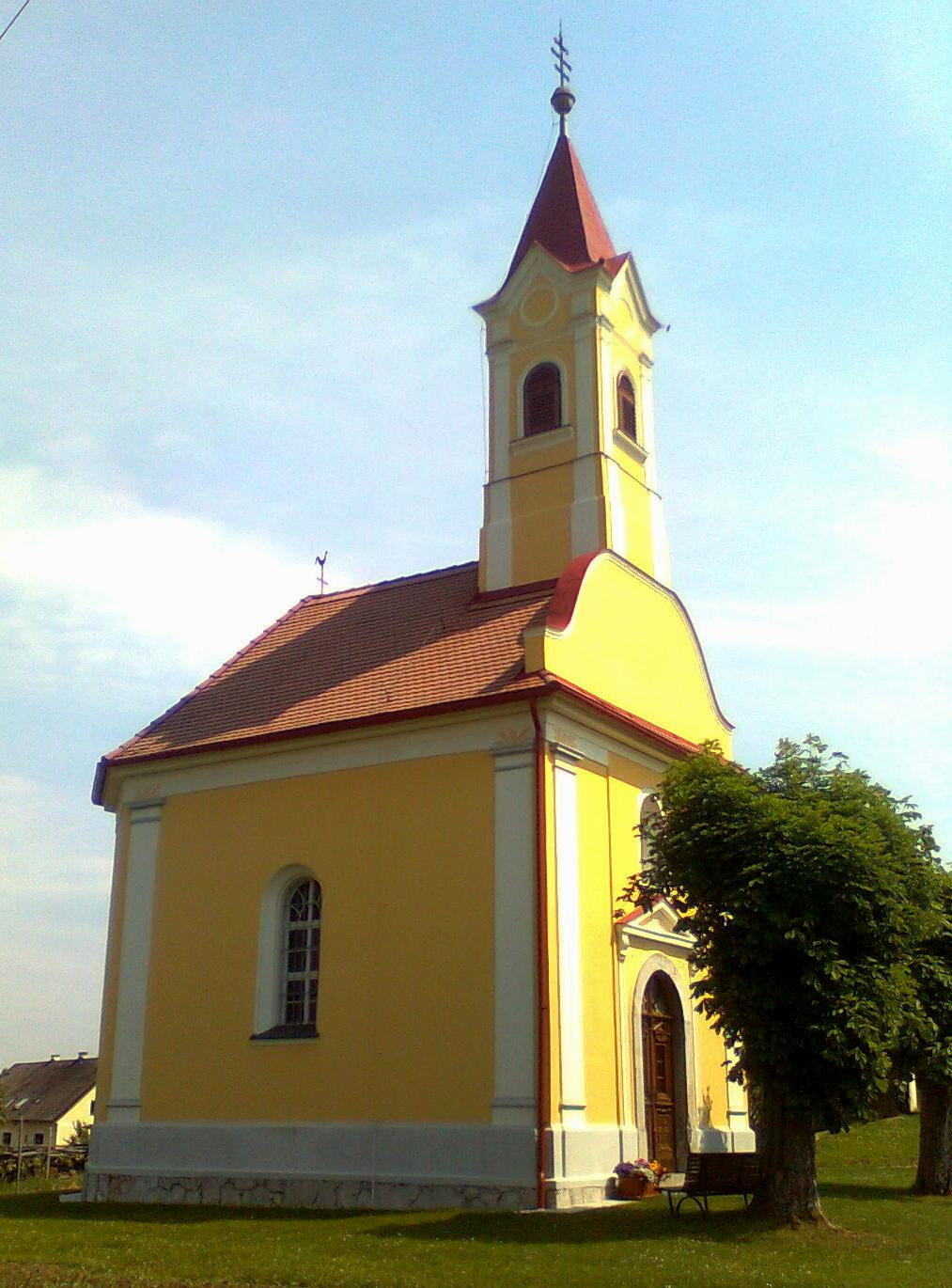
- Donatus chapel in Langegg

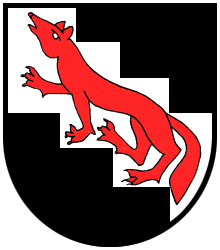
- Coat of arms

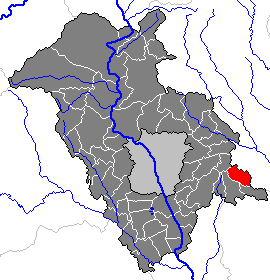
- Location within Graz-Umgebung district

- Location within Austria
- Coordinates: 47°03′36″N 15°38′06″E
- Country: Austria
- State: Styria
- District: Graz-Umgebung

Area
  - Total: 11.34 km^{2} (4.38 sq mi)
- Elevation: 490 m (1,610 ft)

Population (1 January 2016)
  - Total: 833
  - Density: 73.5/km^{2} (190/sq mi)
- Time zone: UTC+1 (CET)
  - Summer (DST): UTC+2 (CEST)
- Postal code: 8323, 8302
- Area code: 03133
- Vehicle registration: GU
- Website: www.langegg-graz. steiermark.at

Langegg bei Graz is a former municipality in the district of Graz-Umgebung in the Austrian state of Styria. Since the 2015 Styria municipal structural reform, it is part of the municipality Nestelbach bei Graz.

== Population ==
Historical population
Year	Pop.	±%
1869	707	—
1880	735	+4.0%
1890	734	−0.1%
1900	740	+0.8%
1910	746	+0.8%
1923	706	−5.4%
1934	757	+7.2%
1939	710	−6.2%
1951	715	+0.7%
1961	671	−6.2%
1971	692	+3.1%
1981	697	+0.7%
1991	732	+5.0%
2001	786	+7.4%

== Notable people ==
Johann Joseph Fux: music theorist known for Gradus ad Parnassus, an influential treaty on counterpoint. He was born in Langegg bei Graz in 1660.
