= Petersdorf, Styria =

Petersdorf II
- Former municipality
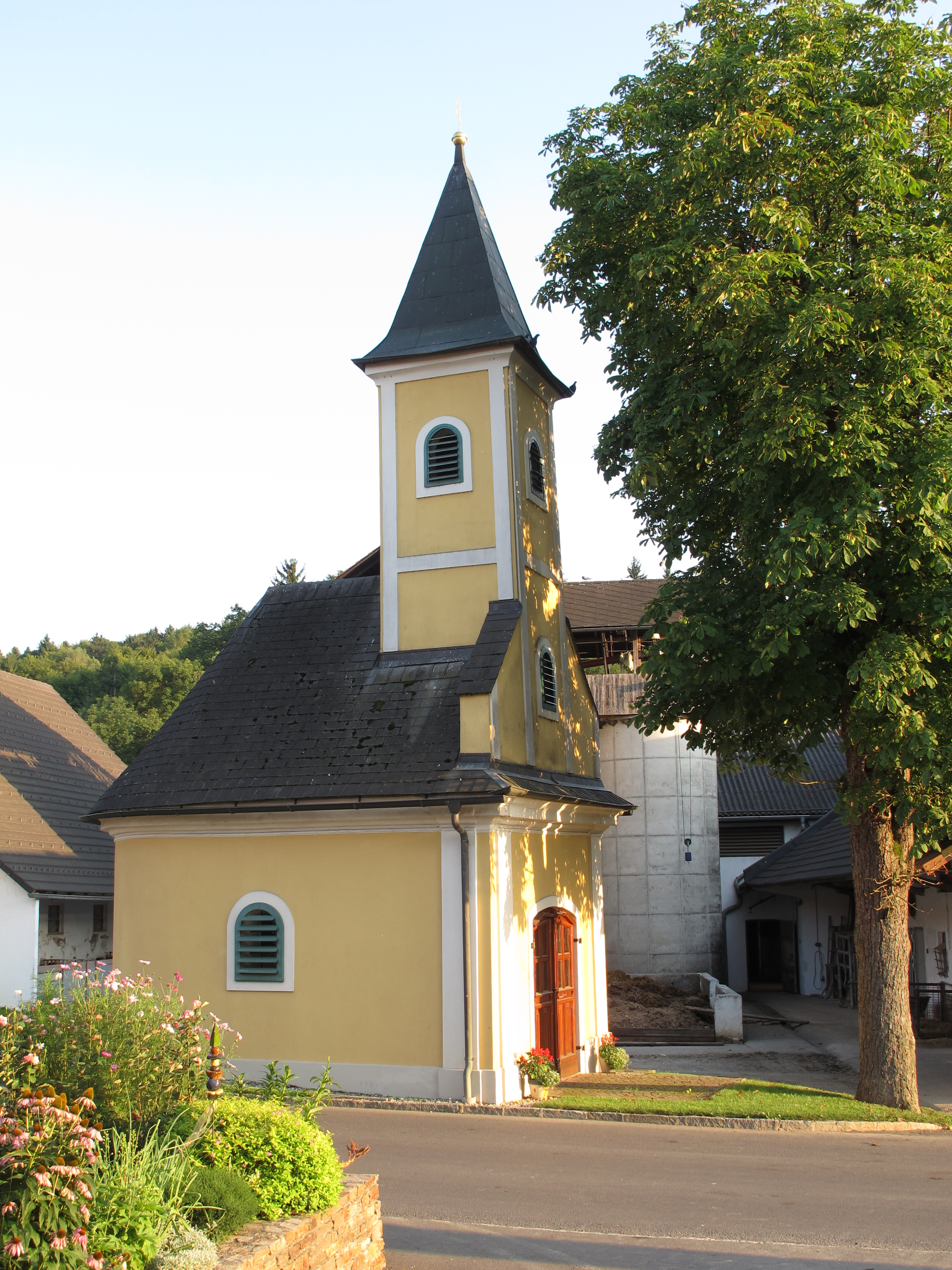
- Chapel in Petersdorf

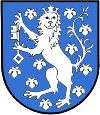
- Coat of arms

- Location within Austria
- Coordinates: 47°00′00″N 15°42′00″E
- Country: Austria
- State: Styria
- District: Graz-Umgebung

Area
  - Total: 15.09 km^{2} (5.83 sq mi)
- Elevation: 362 m (1,188 ft)

Population (1 January 2016)
  - Total: 864
  - Density: 57.3/km^{2} (148/sq mi)
- Time zone: UTC+1 (CET)
  - Summer (DST): UTC+2 (CEST)
- Postal code: 8323
- Area code: +43 3119
- Vehicle registration: FB
- Website: www.petersdorf2.at

Petersdorf (also known as Petersdorf II) was a municipality in the district of Südoststeiermark in the Austrian state of Styria. Since the 2015 Styria municipal structural reform, it is part of the municipality Sankt Marein bei Graz, in the Graz-Umgebung District.

== Population ==
Historical population
Year	Pop.	±%
1869	860	—
1880	902	+4.9%
1890	859	−4.8%
1900	912	+6.2%
1910	914	+0.2%
1923	819	−10.4%
1934	812	−0.9%
1939	789	−2.8%
1951	761	−3.5%
1961	777	+2.1%
1971	752	−3.2%
1981	827	+10.0%
1991	808	−2.3%
2001	843	+4.3%
2013	873	+3.6%
