= Krumegg =

Municipality in Styria, Austria to 2015

- Former municipality
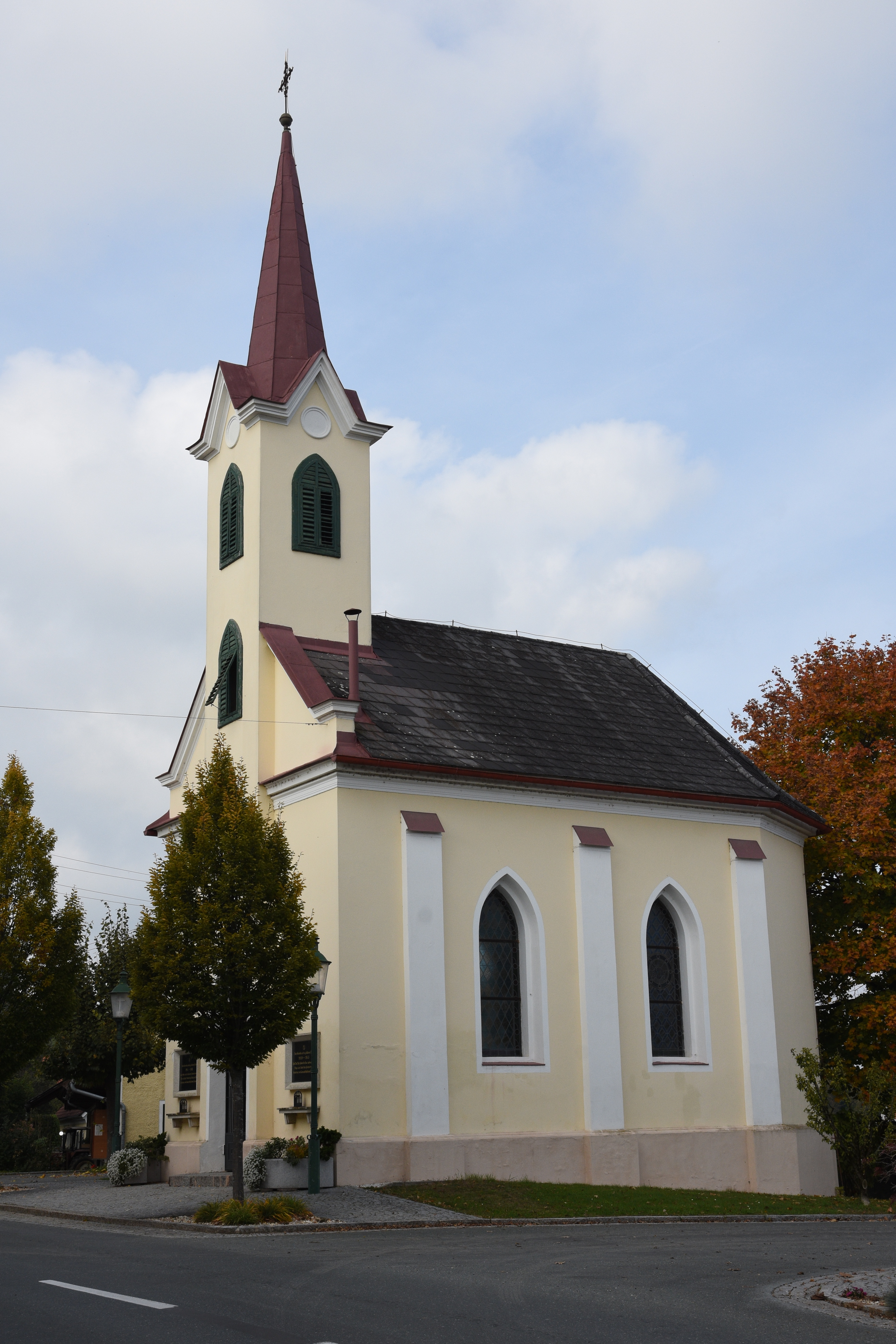
- Krumegg chapel

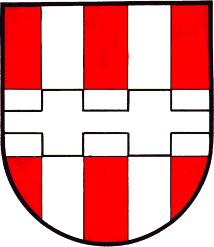
- Coat of arms

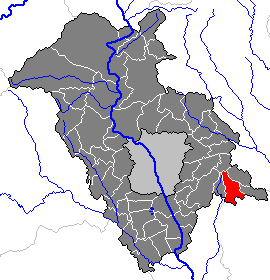
- Location within Graz-Umgebung district

- Location within Austria
- Coordinates: 47°01′13″N 15°38′02″E
- Country: Austria
- State: Styria
- District: Graz-Umgebung

Government
  - Mayor: Josef Hierzer (GL)

Area
  - Total: 16.19 km^{2} (6.25 sq mi)
- Elevation: 463 m (1,519 ft)

Population (1 January 2016)
  - Total: 1,450
  - Density: 89.6/km^{2} (232/sq mi)
- Time zone: UTC+1 (CET)
  - Summer (DST): UTC+2 (CEST)
- Postal code: 8323, 8301
- Area code: 03133, 03119
- Vehicle registration: GU
- Website: www.krumegg. steiermark.at

Krumegg is a former municipality in the district of Graz-Umgebung in the Austrian state of Styria. Since the 2015 Styria municipal structural reform, it is part of the municipality Sankt Marein bei Graz.

== Geography ==
Krumegg lies about 15 km east of Graz in the east Styrian hills.

=== Subdivisions ===
Katastralgemeinden are Brunn, Dornegg, Kocheregg, Hohenegg, Prüfing, Kohldorf, Pirkwiesen, and Krumegg-Ort.
