= Höf-Präbach =

- Former municipality
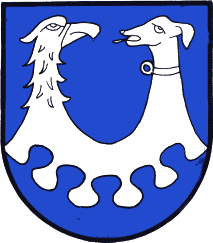
- Coat of arms

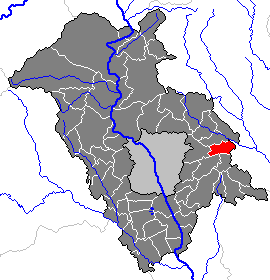
- Location within Graz-Umgebung district

- Location within Austria
- Coordinates: 47°05′57″N 15°37′07″E
- Country: Austria
- State: Styria
- District: Graz-Umgebung

Government
  - Mayor: Anton Krenn (ÖVP)

Area
  - Total: 10.61 km^{2} (4.10 sq mi)
- Elevation: 500 m (1,600 ft)

Population (1 January 2016)
  - Total: 1,385
  - Density: 130.5/km^{2} (338.1/sq mi)
- Time zone: UTC+1 (CET)
  - Summer (DST): UTC+2 (CEST)
- Postal code: 8063, 8301
- Area code: 03117
- Vehicle registration: GU
- Website: www.hoef-praebach. steiermark.at

Höf-Präbach is a former municipality in the district of Graz-Umgebung in Styria, Austria. Since the 2015 Styria municipal structural reform, it is part of the municipality Eggersdorf bei Graz.
