= Haselsdorf-Tobelbad =

- Municipality
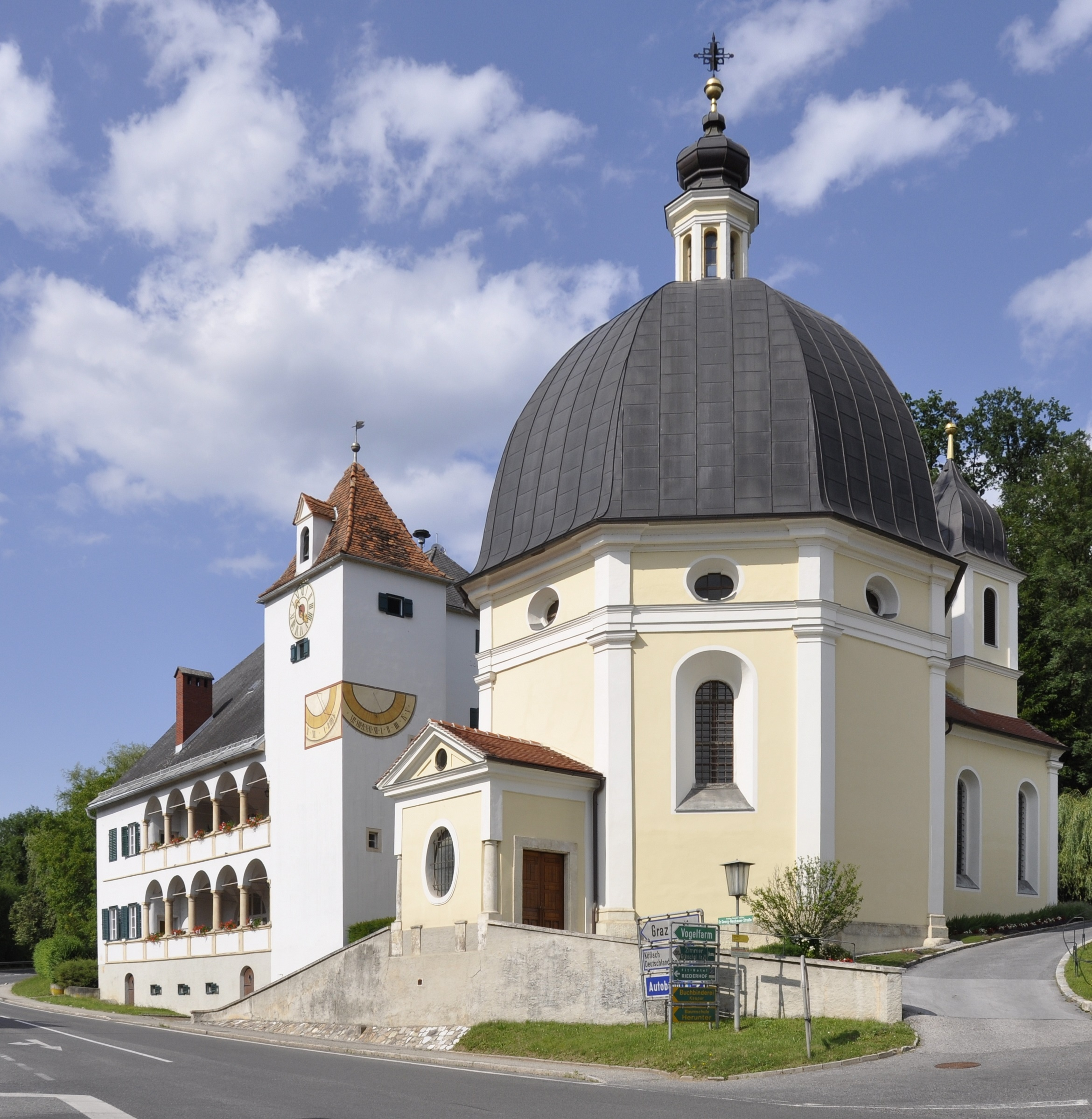
- Tobelbad parish church

- Coat of arms

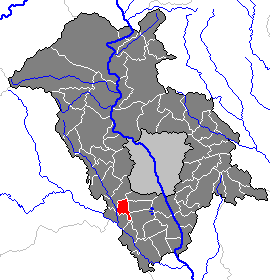
- Location within Graz-Umgebung district

- Location within Austria
- Coordinates: 46°59′18″N 15°20′37″E
- Country: Austria
- State: Styria
- District: Graz-Umgebung

Government
  - Mayor: Helmut Holzapfel (SPÖ)

Area
  - Total: 6.66 km^{2} (2.57 sq mi)
- Elevation: 353 m (1,158 ft)

Population (2018-01-01)
  - Total: 1,426
  - Density: 214/km^{2} (555/sq mi)
- Time zone: UTC+1 (CET)
  - Summer (DST): UTC+2 (CEST)
- Postal code: 8144
- Area code: 03136
- Vehicle registration: GU
- Website: www.haselsdorf-tobelbad.at

Haselsdorf-Tobelbad is a municipality in the district of Graz-Umgebung in the Austrian state of Styria. It was the birthplace of Erik von Kuehnelt-Leddihn.

== Geography ==
Haselsdorf-Tobelbad lies about 10 km southwest of Graz in western Styria.

== Politics ==
The municipal council (Gemeinderat) is composed of 15 members and, following the 2025 Styrian local elections, represents the following parties:

- Social Democratic Party of Austria (SPÖ): 13 seats
- Austrian People's Party (ÖVP): 1 seat
- Freedom Party of Austria (FPÖ): 1 seat

The mayor of Haselsdorf-Tobelbad is Helmut Holzapfel (SPÖ).
