= Schrems bei Frohnleiten =

- Former municipality
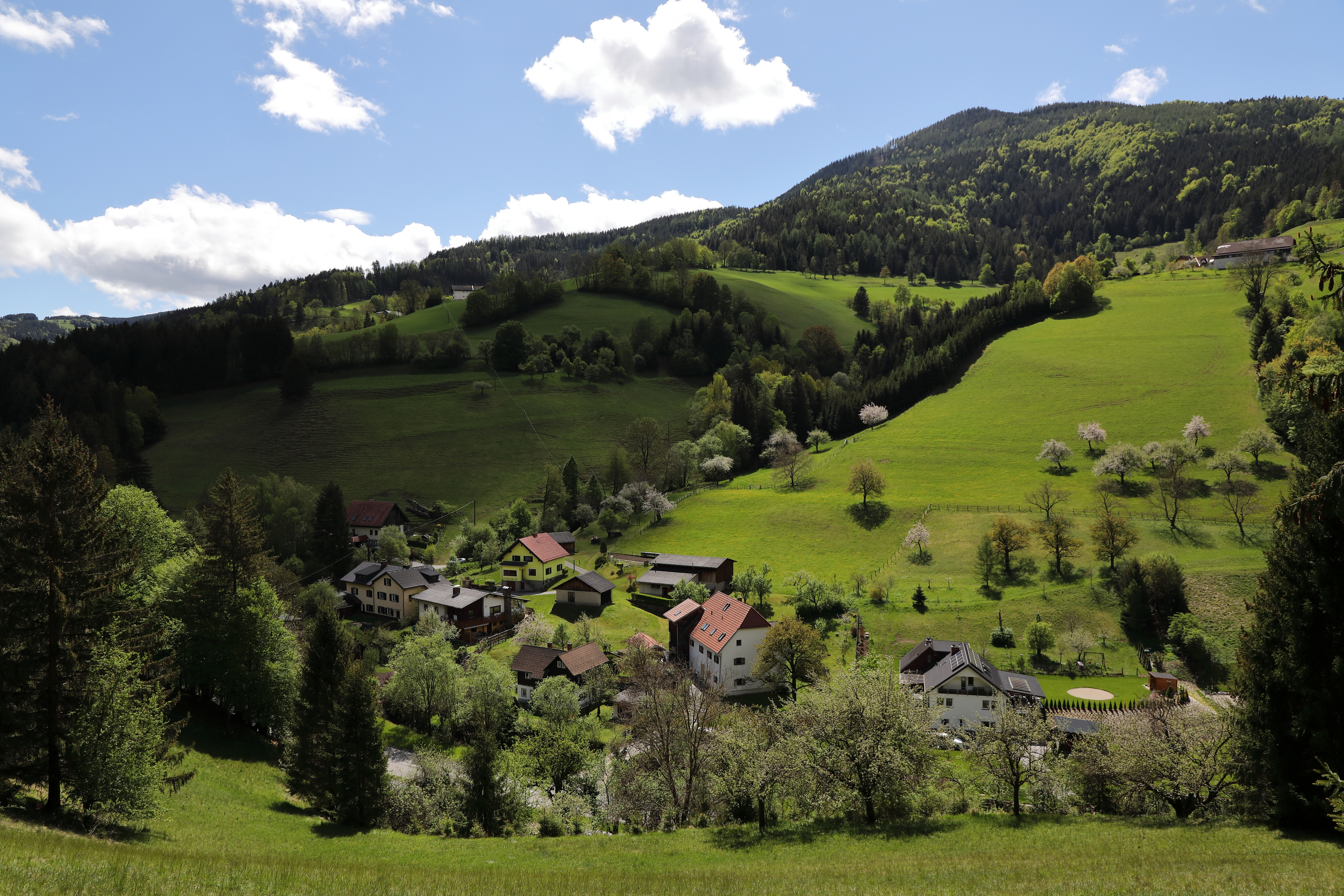
- View of Schrems

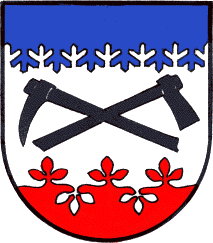
- Coat of arms

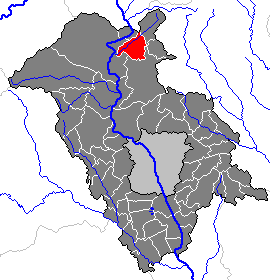
- Location within Graz-Umgebung district

- Location within Austria
- Coordinates: 47°16′46″N 15°21′51″E
- Country: Austria
- State: Styria
- District: Graz-Umgebung

Area
  - Total: 19.25 km^{2} (7.43 sq mi)
- Elevation: 493 m (1,617 ft)

Population (1 January 2016)
  - Total: 602
  - Density: 31.3/km^{2} (81.0/sq mi)
- Time zone: UTC+1 (CET)
  - Summer (DST): UTC+2 (CEST)
- Postal code: 8130
- Area code: 03126
- Vehicle registration: GU
- Website: www.schrems-frohnleiten. steiermark.at

Schrems bei Frohnleiten is a former municipality in the district of Graz-Umgebung in the Austrian state of Styria. Since the 2015 Styria municipal structural reform, it is part of the municipality Frohnleiten.

== Population ==
Historical population
| Year | Pop. | ±% |
|---|---|---|
| 1869 | 541 | — |
| 1880 | 592 | +9.4% |
| 1890 | 620 | +4.7% |
| 1900 | 571 | −7.9% |
| 1910 | 590 | +3.3% |
| 1923 | 632 | +7.1% |
| 1934 | 735 | +16.3% |
| 1939 | 684 | −6.9% |
| 1951 | 688 | +0.6% |
| 1961 | 722 | +4.9% |
| 1971 | 614 | −15.0% |
| 1981 | 575 | −6.4% |
| 1991 | 499 | −13.2% |
| 2001 | 553 | +10.8% |
| 2011 | 584 | +5.6% |
