= Semriach =

- Municipality
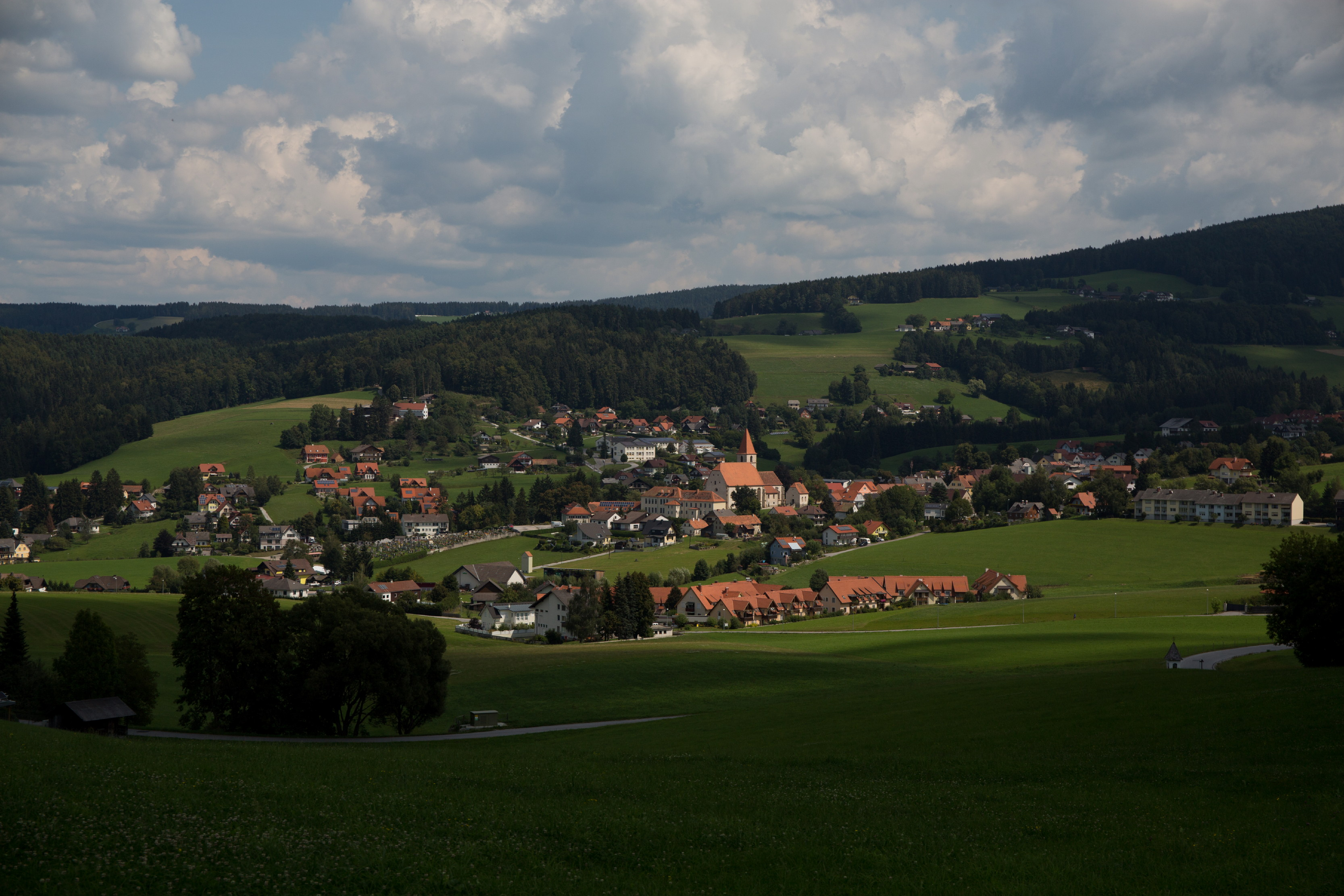
- View of Semriach

- Coat of arms

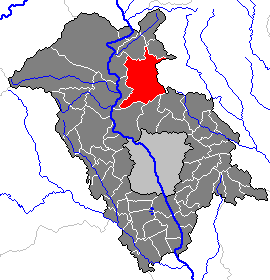
- Location within Graz-Umgebung district

- Location within Austria
- Coordinates: 47°13′03″N 15°24′12″E
- Country: Austria
- State: Styria
- District: Graz-Umgebung

Government
  - Mayor: Gottfried Rieger (ÖVP)

Area
  - Total: 60.35 km^{2} (23.30 sq mi)
- Elevation: 709 m (2,326 ft)

Population (2018-01-01)
  - Total: 3,323
  - Density: 55.06/km^{2} (142.6/sq mi)
- Time zone: UTC+1 (CET)
  - Summer (DST): UTC+2 (CEST)
- Postal code: 8102
- Area code: 03127
- Vehicle registration: GU
- Website: www.semriach.at

Semriach (Austrian German: [ˈsɛmʁiˌax]) is a municipality in the district of Graz-Umgebung in the Austrian state of Styria.

== Population ==
Historical population
Year	Pop.	±%
1869	2,822	—
1880	2,961	+4.9%
1890	3,018	+1.9%
1900	3,022	+0.1%
1910	2,993	−1.0%
1923	2,924	−2.3%
1934	3,069	+5.0%
1939	2,867	−6.6%
1951	2,873	+0.2%
1961	2,615	−9.0%
1971	2,680	+2.5%
1981	2,676	−0.1%
1991	2,876	+7.5%
2001	3,163	+10.0%
