= Tulwitz =

- Former municipality
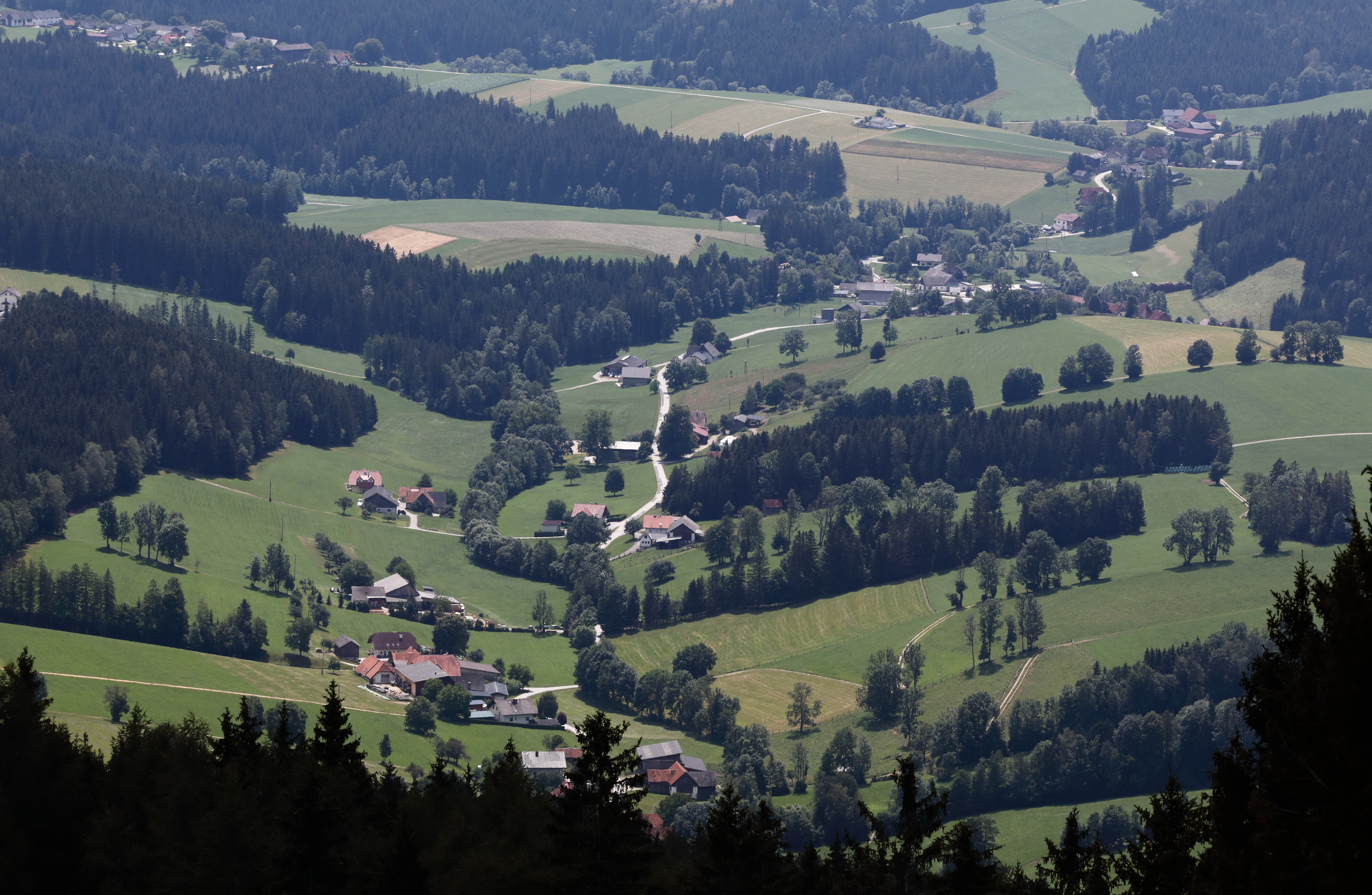
- Remote view of Tulwitz

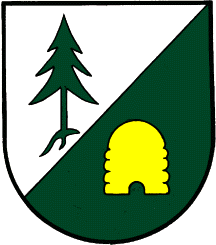
- Coat of arms

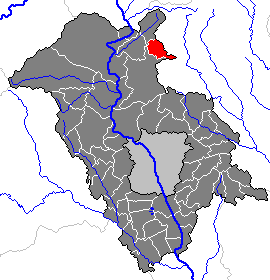
- Location within Weiz district

- Location within Austria
- Coordinates: 47°16′11″N 15°27′38″E
- Country: Austria
- State: Styria
- District: Weiz

Area
  - Total: 11.56 km^{2} (4.46 sq mi)
- Elevation: 650 m (2,130 ft)

Population (1 January 2016)
  - Total: 508
  - Density: 43.9/km^{2} (114/sq mi)
- Time zone: UTC+1 (CET)
  - Summer (DST): UTC+2 (CEST)
- Postal code: 8163
- Area code: 03179
- Vehicle registration: GU
- Website: www.tulwitz. steiermark.at

Tulwitz is a former municipality in the district of Graz-Umgebung in the Austrian state of Styria. Since the 2015 Styria municipal structural reform, it is part of the municipality Fladnitz an der Teichalm, in the Weiz District.

== Population ==
Historical population
Year	Pop.	±%
1869	628	—
1880	652	+3.8%
1890	606	−7.1%
1900	605	−0.2%
1910	616	+1.8%
1923	621	+0.8%
1934	617	−0.6%
1939	590	−4.4%
1951	566	−4.1%
1961	513	−9.4%
1971	517	+0.8%
1981	515	−0.4%
1991	517	+0.4%
2001	500	−3.3%
