= Wundschuh =

- Municipality
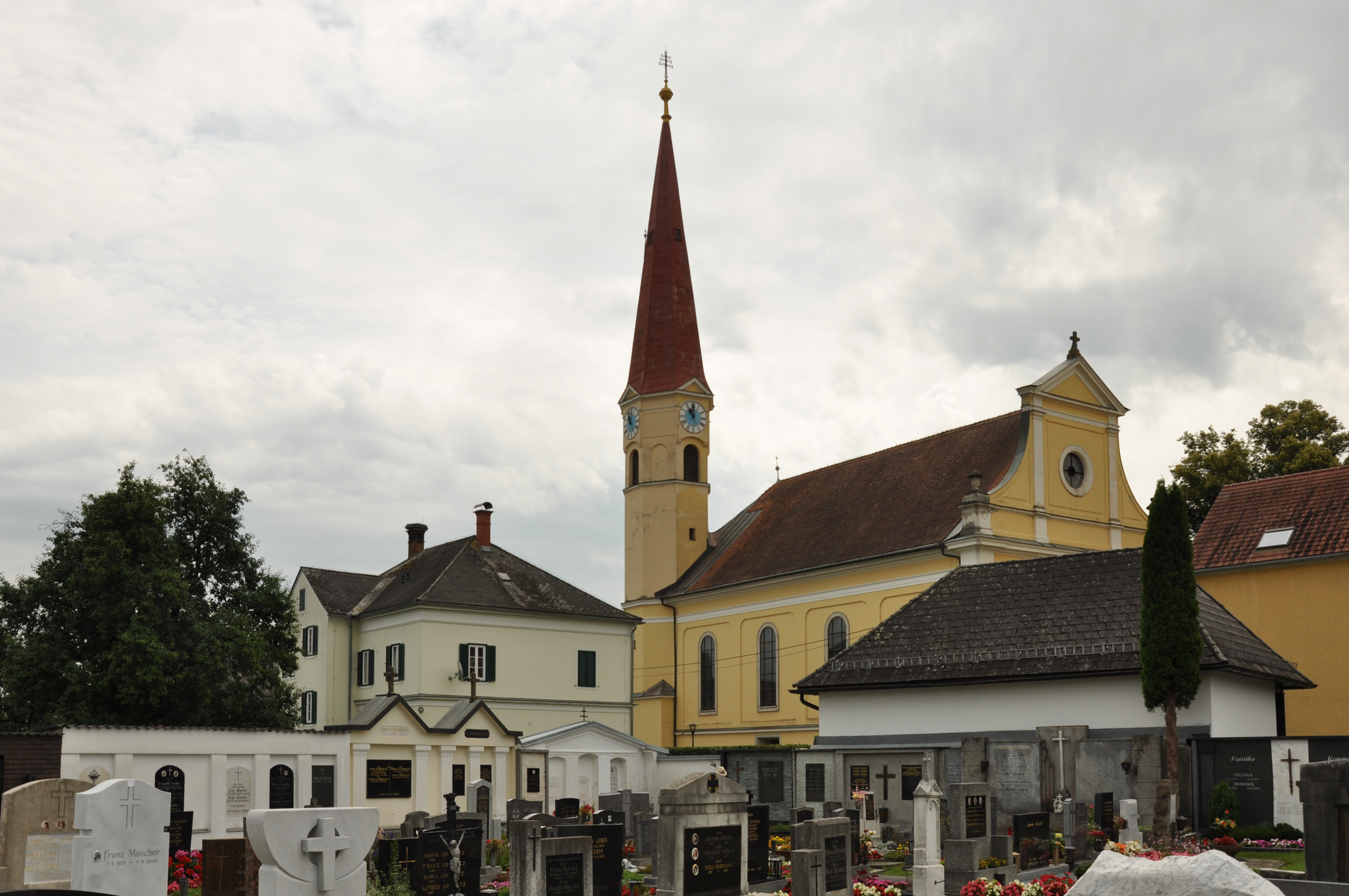
- Wundschuh parish church and cemetery

- Coat of arms

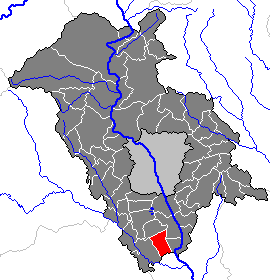
- Location within Graz-Umgebung district

- Location within Austria
- Coordinates: 46°55′35″N 15°27′4″E
- Country: Austria
- State: Styria
- District: Graz-Umgebung

Government
  - Mayor: Karl Brodschneider (ÖVP)

Area
  - Total: 12.79 km^{2} (4.94 sq mi)
- Elevation: 322 m (1,056 ft)

Population (2018-01-01)
  - Total: 1,599
  - Density: 125.0/km^{2} (323.8/sq mi)
- Time zone: UTC+1 (CET)
  - Summer (DST): UTC+2 (CEST)
- Postal code: 8142
- Area code: 03135
- Vehicle registration: GU
- Website: www.wundschuh.at

Wundschuh is a municipality in the district of Graz-Umgebung in the Austrian state of Styria.

== Geography ==
Wundschuh lies in the Graz basin in the Kaiser forest about 12 km south of Graz.

=== Subdivisions ===
Katastralgemeinden are Kasten and Wundschuh. Other communities are Forst, pop. 122, Gradenfeld, pop. 176, Kasten, pop. 319, Ponigl, pop. 104, and Wundschuh, pop, 676.
