= Übelbach =

- Municipality
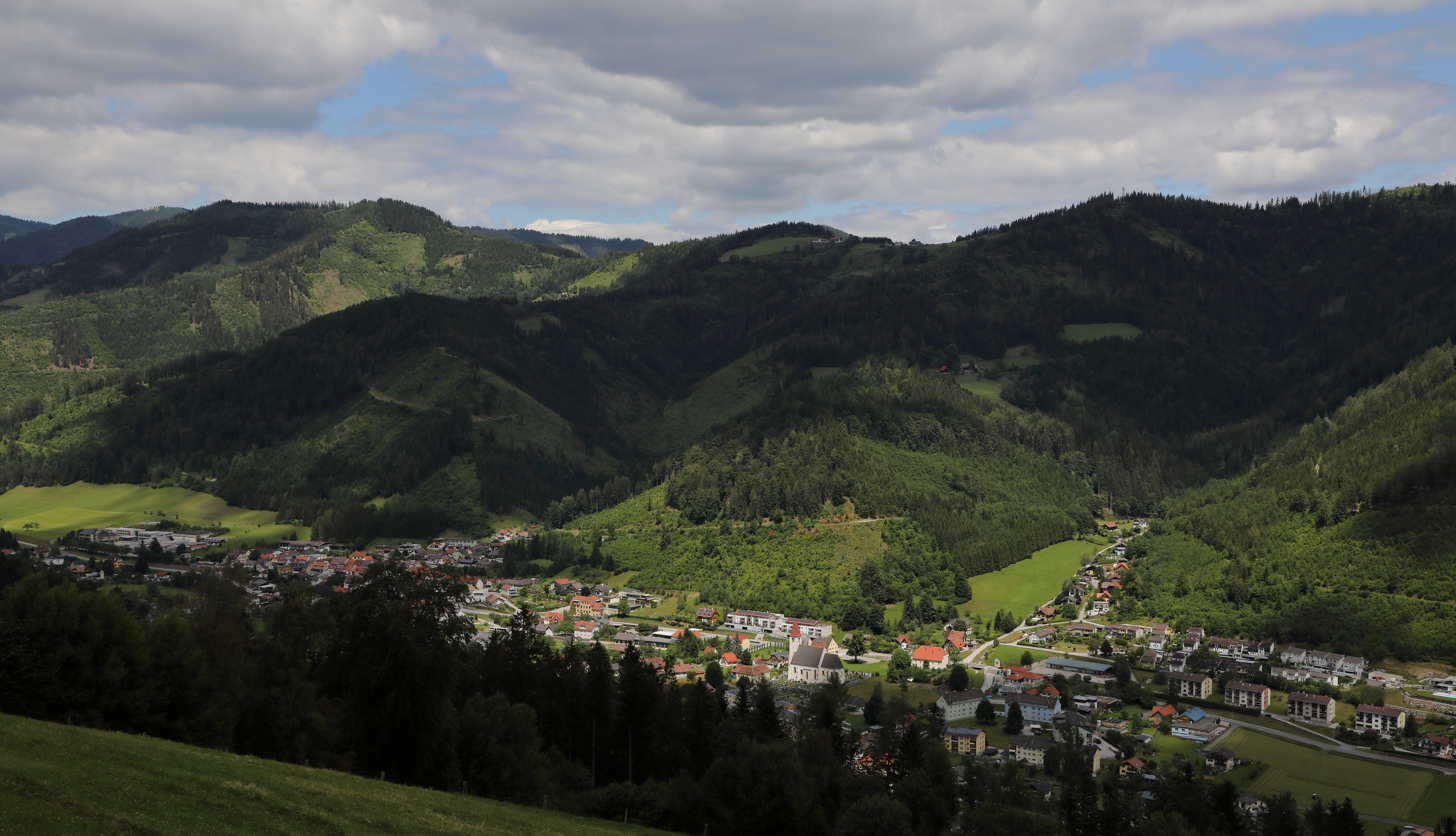
- Remote view of Übelbach

- Coat of arms

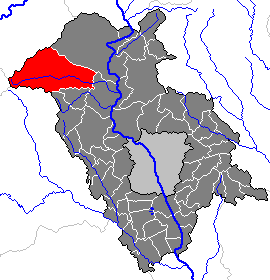
- Location within Graz-Umgebung district

- Location within Austria
- Coordinates: 47°13′35″N 15°14′05″E
- Country: Austria
- State: Styria
- District: Graz-Umgebung

Government
  - Mayor: Markus Windisch (ÖVP)

Area
  - Total: 94.52 km^{2} (36.49 sq mi)
- Elevation: 580 m (1,900 ft)

Population (2018-01-01)
  - Total: 2,036
  - Density: 21.54/km^{2} (55.79/sq mi)
- Time zone: UTC+1 (CET)
  - Summer (DST): UTC+2 (CEST)
- Postal code: 8124
- Area code: 03125
- Vehicle registration: GU
- Website: www.uebelbach.gv.at

Übelbach is a municipality in the district of Graz-Umgebung in the Austrian state of Styria.

== Population ==
Historical population
Year	Pop.	±%
1869	2,280	—
1880	2,373	+4.1%
1890	2,493	+5.1%
1900	2,565	+2.9%
1910	2,358	−8.1%
1923	2,385	+1.1%
1934	2,616	+9.7%
1939	2,417	−7.6%
1951	2,523	+4.4%
1961	2,449	−2.9%
1971	2,303	−6.0%
1981	2,129	−7.6%
1991	2,162	+1.6%
2001	2,124	−1.8%
