= Kainbach bei Graz =

- Municipality
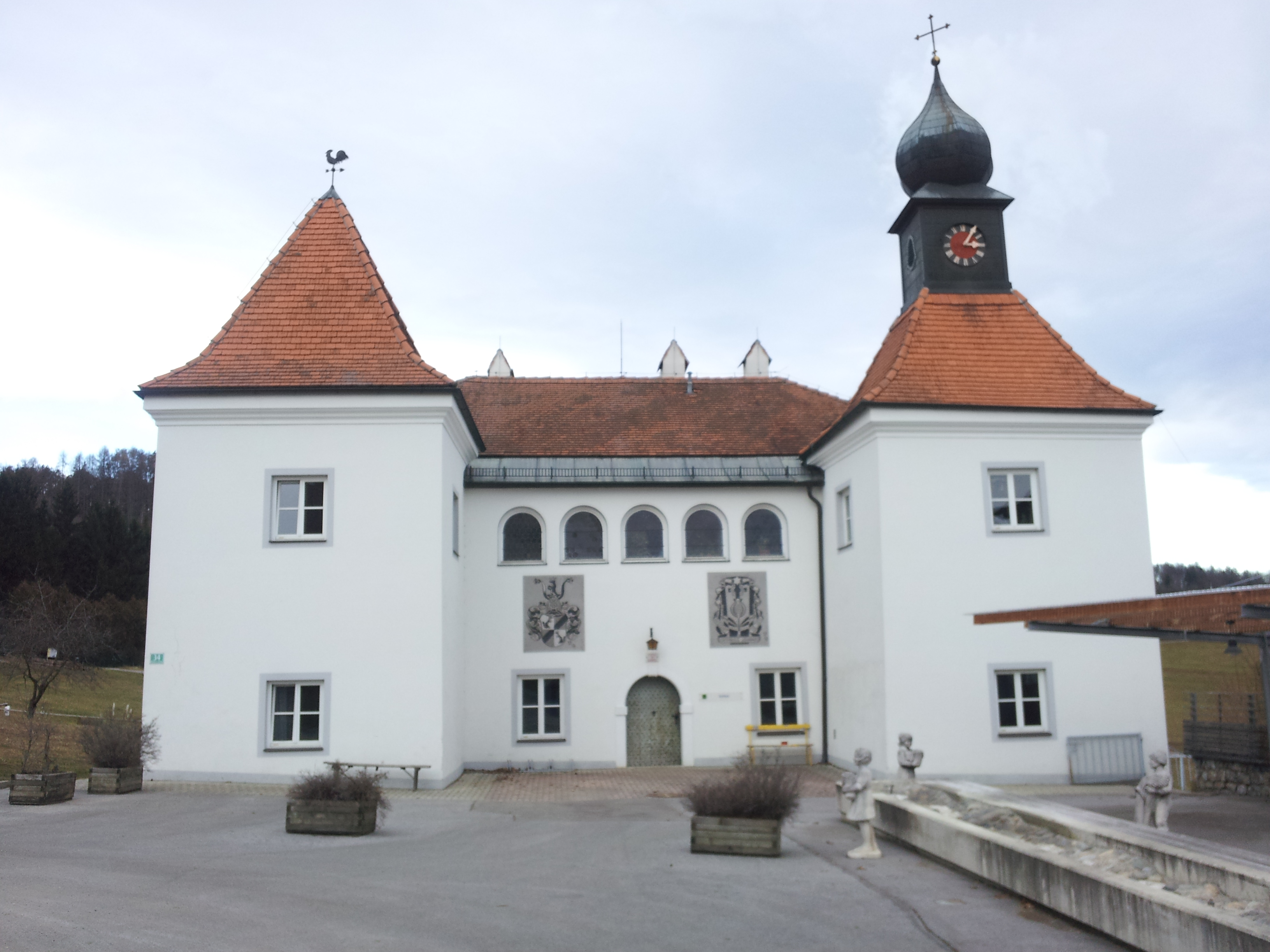
- Kainbach Castle

- Coat of arms

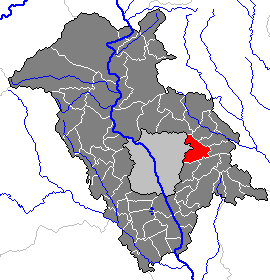
- Location within Graz-Umgebung district

- Location within Austria
- Coordinates: 47°06′00″N 15°33′22″E
- Country: Austria
- State: Styria
- District: Graz-Umgebung

Government
  - Mayor: Mag. Manfred Schöninger (ÖVP)

Area
  - Total: 17.75 km^{2} (6.85 sq mi)
- Elevation: 440 m (1,440 ft)

Population (2018-01-01)
  - Total: 2,834
  - Density: 159.7/km^{2} (413.5/sq mi)
- Time zone: UTC+1 (CET)
  - Summer (DST): UTC+2 (CEST)
- Postal code: 8010, 8047, 8301
- Area code: 0316, 03133
- Vehicle registration: GU
- Website: www.kainbach. steiermark.at

Kainbach bei Graz is a municipality in the district of Graz-Umgebung in the Austrian state of Styria.

== Geography ==
Kainbach lies about 5 km east of Graz in the east Styrian hills.
