= Attendorf =

- Former municipality
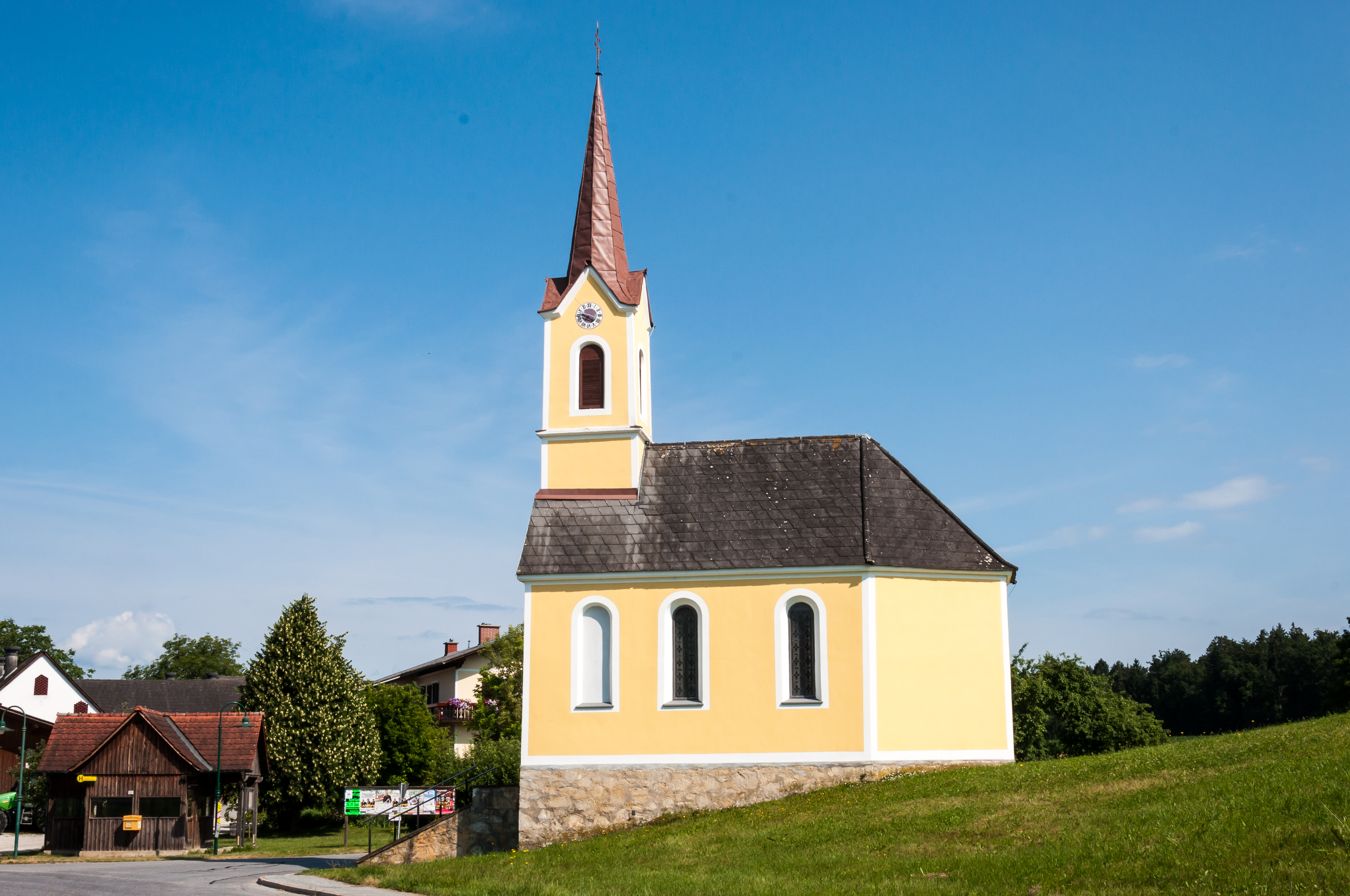
- Attendorf chapel

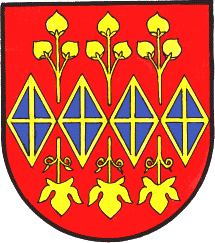
- Coat of arms

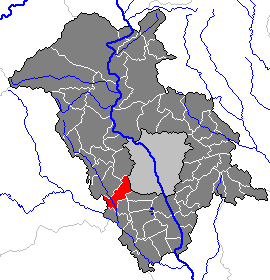
- Location within Graz-Umgebung district

- Location within Austria
- Coordinates: 47°00′20″N 15°19′34″E
- Country: Austria
- State: Styria
- District: Graz-Umgebung

Area
  - Total: 15.66 km^{2} (6.05 sq mi)
- Elevation: 354 m (1,161 ft)

Population (1 January 2016)
  - Total: 1,831
  - Density: 116.9/km^{2} (302.8/sq mi)
- Time zone: UTC+1 (CET)
  - Summer (DST): UTC+2 (CEST)
- Postal code: 8151, 8052, 8054, 8144, 8561
- Area code: 03137
- Vehicle registration: GU
- Website: www.attendorf.com

Attendorf is a former municipality in the district of Graz-Umgebung in the Austrian state of Styria. Since the 2015 Styria municipal structural reform, it is part of the municipality Hitzendorf.

== Geography ==
Attendorf lies about 10 km southwest of Graz on the Lusenbach, a tributary of the Kainach.
