= Sankt Oswald bei Plankenwarth =

- Municipality
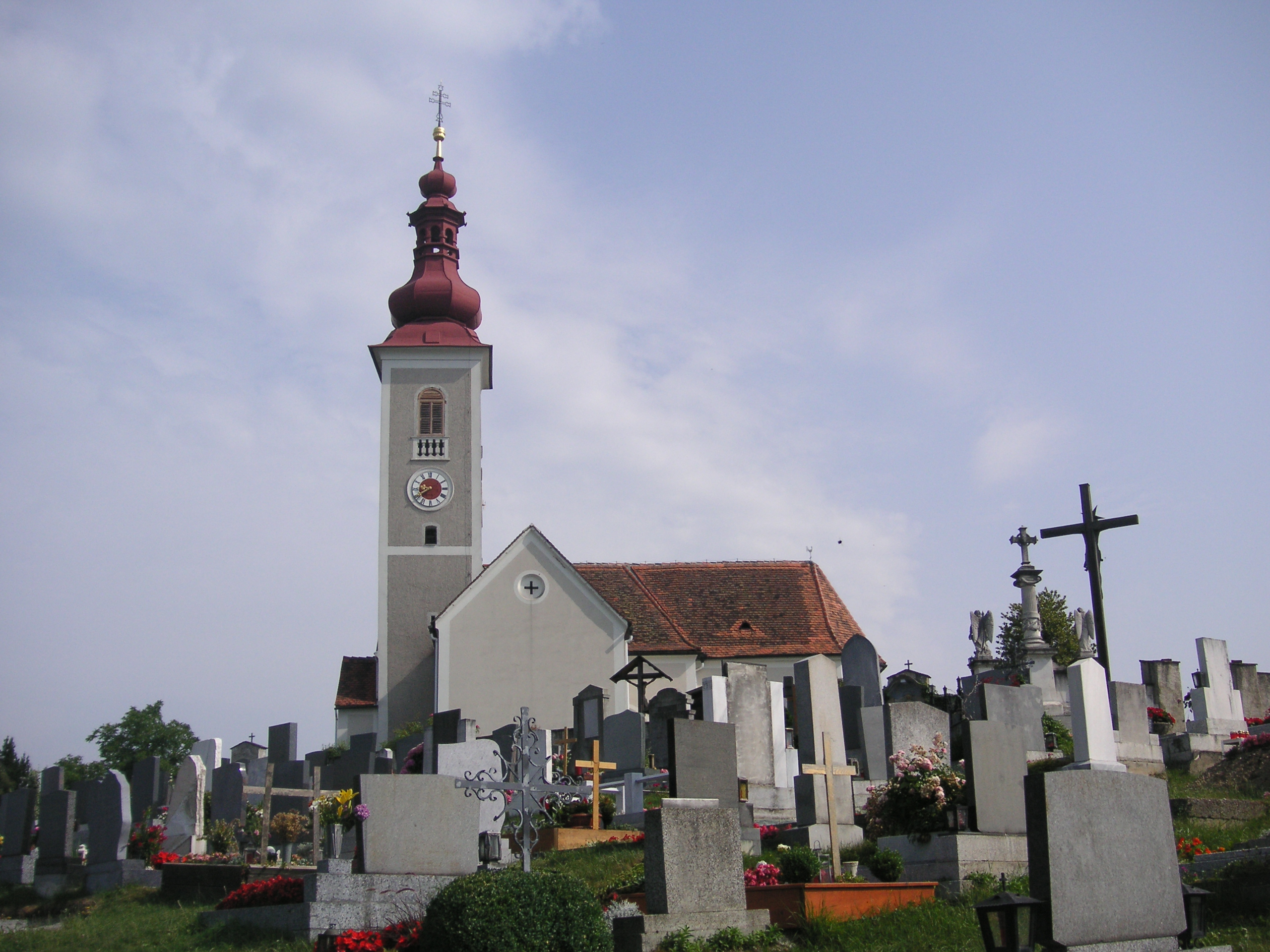
- Sankt Oswald parish church and cemetery

- Coat of arms

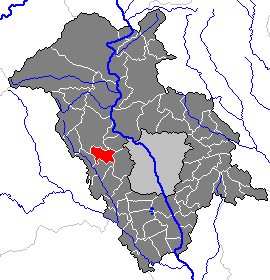
- Location within Graz-Umgebung district

- Location within Austria
- Coordinates: 47°04′47″N 15°16′47″E
- Country: Austria
- State: Styria
- District: Graz-Umgebung

Government
  - Mayor: Andreas Staude (SPÖ)

Area
  - Total: 11.75 km^{2} (4.54 sq mi)
- Elevation: 557 m (1,827 ft)

Population (2018-01-01)
  - Total: 1,244
  - Density: 105.9/km^{2} (274.2/sq mi)
- Time zone: UTC+1 (CET)
  - Summer (DST): UTC+2 (CEST)
- Postal code: 8113
- Area code: 03123
- Vehicle registration: GU
- Website: www.sanktoswald.net

Sankt Oswald bei Plankenwarth is a municipality in the district of Graz-Umgebung in the Austrian state of Styria. It has a population of around 1,300 residents. Key landmarks of this region are the Pfarrkirche St. Oswald, a Roman Catholic parish church perched on a hill, and the Schloss Plankenwarth.

== Population ==
Historical population
Year	Pop.	±%
1869	770	—
1880	800	+3.9%
1890	797	−0.4%
1900	762	−4.4%
1910	792	+3.9%
1923	802	+1.3%
1934	769	−4.1%
1939	700	−9.0%
1951	777	+11.0%
1961	761	−2.1%
1971	754	−0.9%
1981	850	+12.7%
1991	1,006	+18.4%
2001	1,135	+12.8%
