= Sankt Bartholomä =

- Municipality
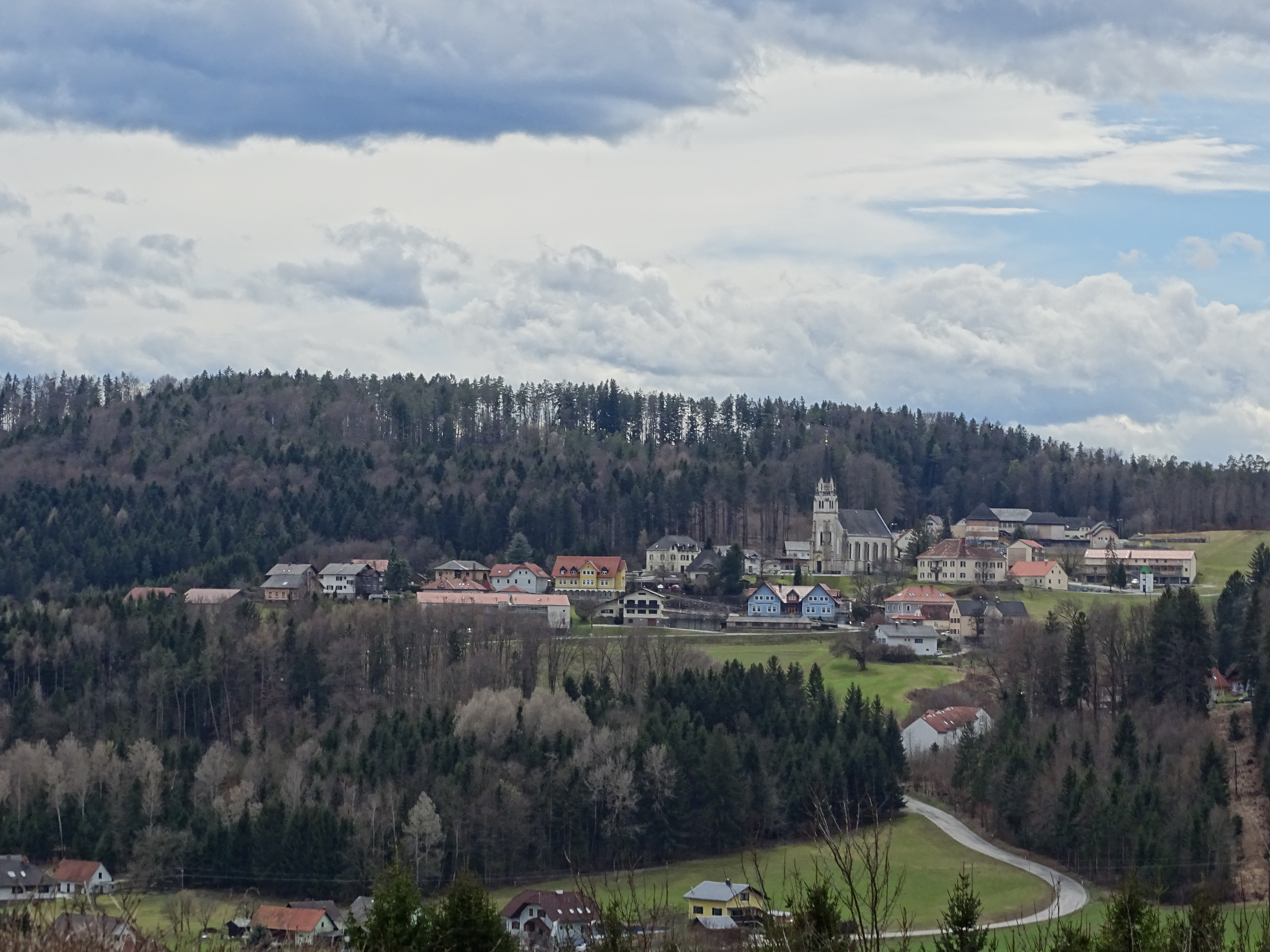
- View of Sankt Bartholomä

- Coat of arms

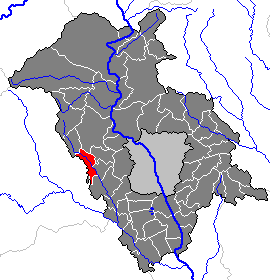
- Location within Graz-Umgebung district

- Location within Austria
- Coordinates: 47°04′08″N 15°15′26″E
- Country: Austria
- State: Styria
- District: Graz-Umgebung

Government
  - Mayor: Josef Birnstingl (ÖVP)

Area
  - Total: 11.75 km^{2} (4.54 sq mi)
- Elevation: 499 m (1,637 ft)

Population (2018-01-01)
  - Total: 1,442
  - Density: 122.7/km^{2} (317.9/sq mi)
- Time zone: UTC+1 (CET)
  - Summer (DST): UTC+2 (CEST)
- Postal code: 8113, 8151
- Area code: 03123
- Vehicle registration: GU
- Website: www.st-bartholomae.gv.at

Sankt Bartholomä is a municipality in the district of Graz-Umgebung in the Austrian state of Styria.

== Population ==
Historical population
Year	Pop.	±%
1869	1,032	—
1880	1,078	+4.5%
1890	1,063	−1.4%
1900	1,057	−0.6%
1910	1,107	+4.7%
1923	1,017	−8.1%
1934	990	−2.7%
1939	980	−1.0%
1951	1,043	+6.4%
1961	1,073	+2.9%
1971	1,159	+8.0%
1981	1,220	+5.3%
1991	1,361	+11.6%
2001	1,399	+2.8%
