= Stiwoll =

- Municipality
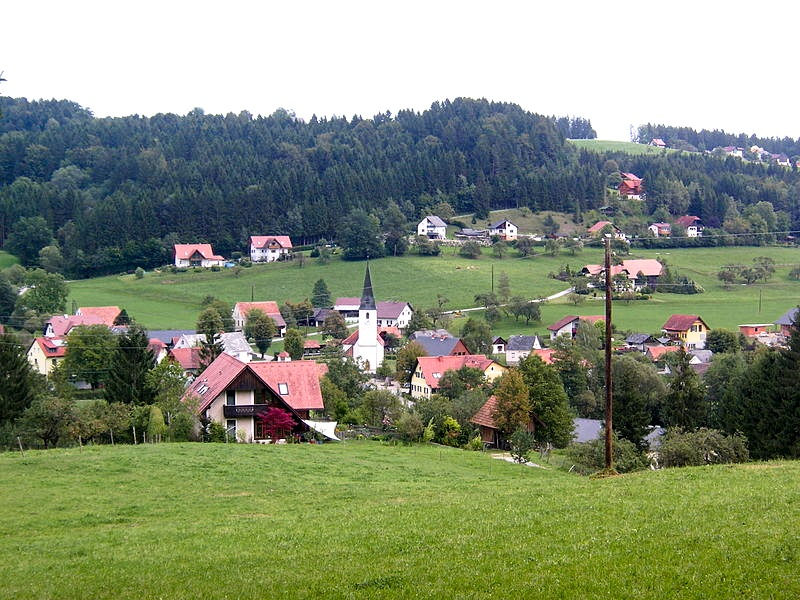
- View of Stiwoll

- Coat of arms

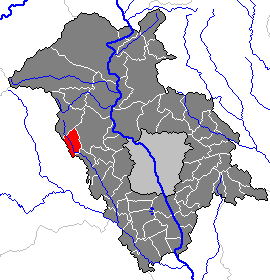
- Location within Graz-Umgebung district

- Location within Austria
- Coordinates: 47°06′08″N 15°13′09″E
- Country: Austria
- State: Styria
- District: Graz-Umgebung

Government
  - Mayor: Willi Zenz (ÖVP)

Area
  - Total: 12.96 km^{2} (5.00 sq mi)
- Elevation: 495 m (1,624 ft)

Population (2018-01-01)
  - Total: 722
  - Density: 55.7/km^{2} (144/sq mi)
- Time zone: UTC+1 (CET)
  - Summer (DST): UTC+2 (CEST)
- Postal code: 8113
- Area code: 03142
- Vehicle registration: GU
- Website: www.stiwoll.steiermark.at

Stiwoll is a municipality in the district of Graz-Umgebung in the Austrian state of Styria.

== Population ==
Historical population
| Year | Pop. | ±% |
|---|---|---|
| 1869 | 720 | — |
| 1880 | 792 | +10.0% |
| 1890 | 782 | −1.3% |
| 1900 | 748 | −4.3% |
| 1910 | 733 | −2.0% |
| 1923 | 735 | +0.3% |
| 1934 | 781 | +6.3% |
| 1939 | 741 | −5.1% |
| 1951 | 759 | +2.4% |
| 1961 | 683 | −10.0% |
| 1971 | 725 | +6.1% |
| 1981 | 716 | −1.2% |
| 1991 | 699 | −2.4% |
| 2001 | 701 | +0.3% |
