= Weinitzen =

- Municipality
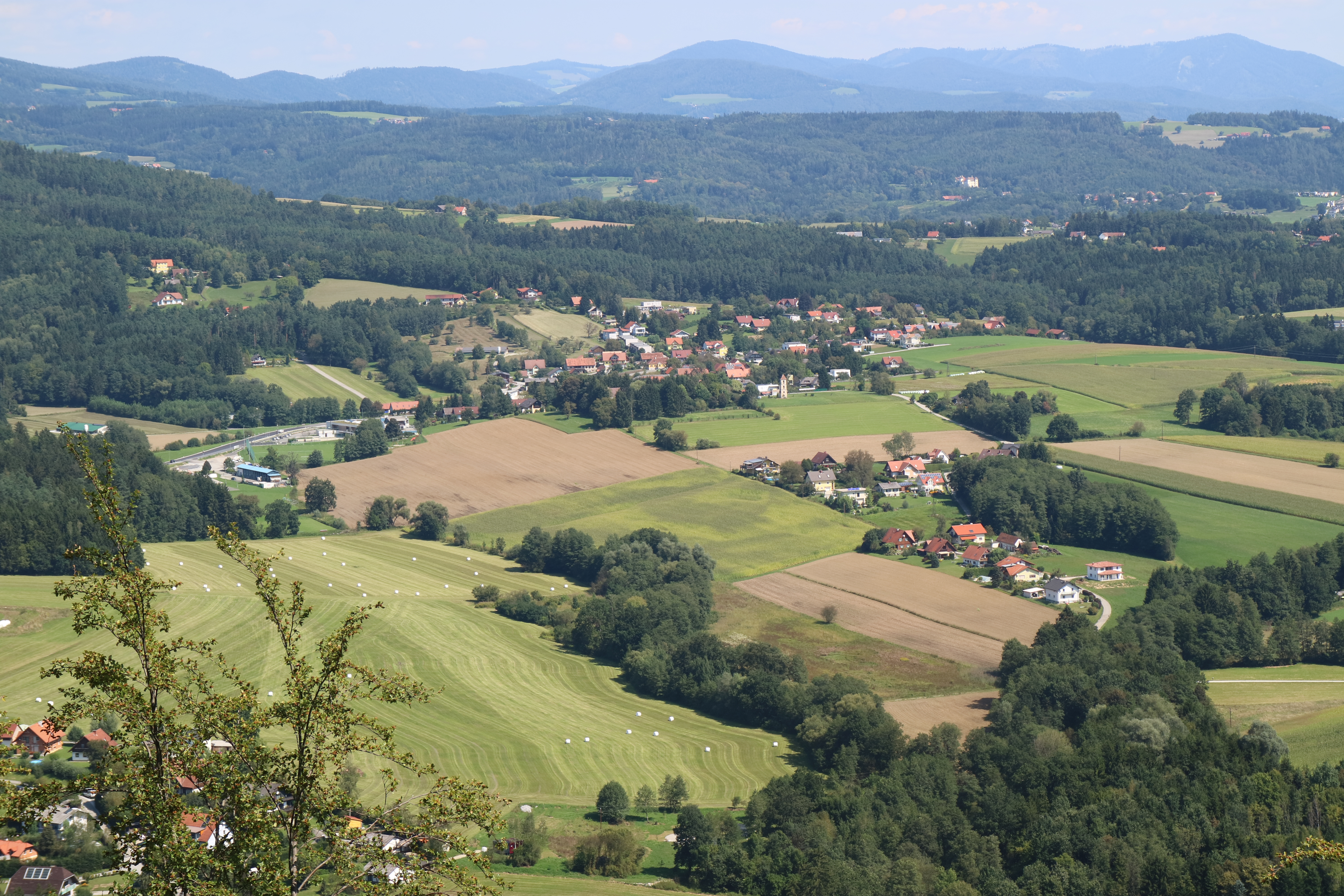
- Remote view of Weinitzen

- Coat of arms

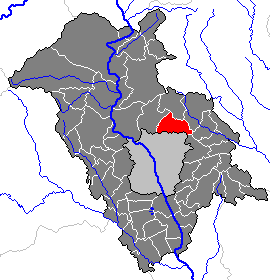
- Location within Graz-Umgebung district

- Location within Austria
- Coordinates: 47°08′27″N 15°29′26″E
- Country: Austria
- State: Styria
- District: Graz-Umgebung

Government
  - Mayor: Hans Werner Tüchler

Area
  - Total: 18.95 km^{2} (7.32 sq mi)
- Elevation: 510 m (1,670 ft)

Population (2018-01-01)
  - Total: 2,617
  - Density: 138.1/km^{2} (357.7/sq mi)
- Time zone: UTC+1 (CET)
  - Summer (DST): UTC+2 (CEST)
- Postal code: 8044
- Area code: 03132
- Vehicle registration: GU
- Website: https://www.weinitzen.gv.at/

Weinitzen is a municipality in the district of Graz-Umgebung in the Austrian state of Styria.

== Population ==
Historical population
Year	Pop.	±%
1869	877	—
1880	862	−1.7%
1890	895	+3.8%
1900	900	+0.6%
1910	909	+1.0%
1923	869	−4.4%
1934	982	+13.0%
1939	1,031	+5.0%
1951	1,115	+8.1%
1961	1,162	+4.2%
1971	1,456	+25.3%
1981	1,874	+28.7%
1991	2,224	+18.7%
2001	2,424	+9.0%
