= Rohrbach-Steinberg =

- Former municipality
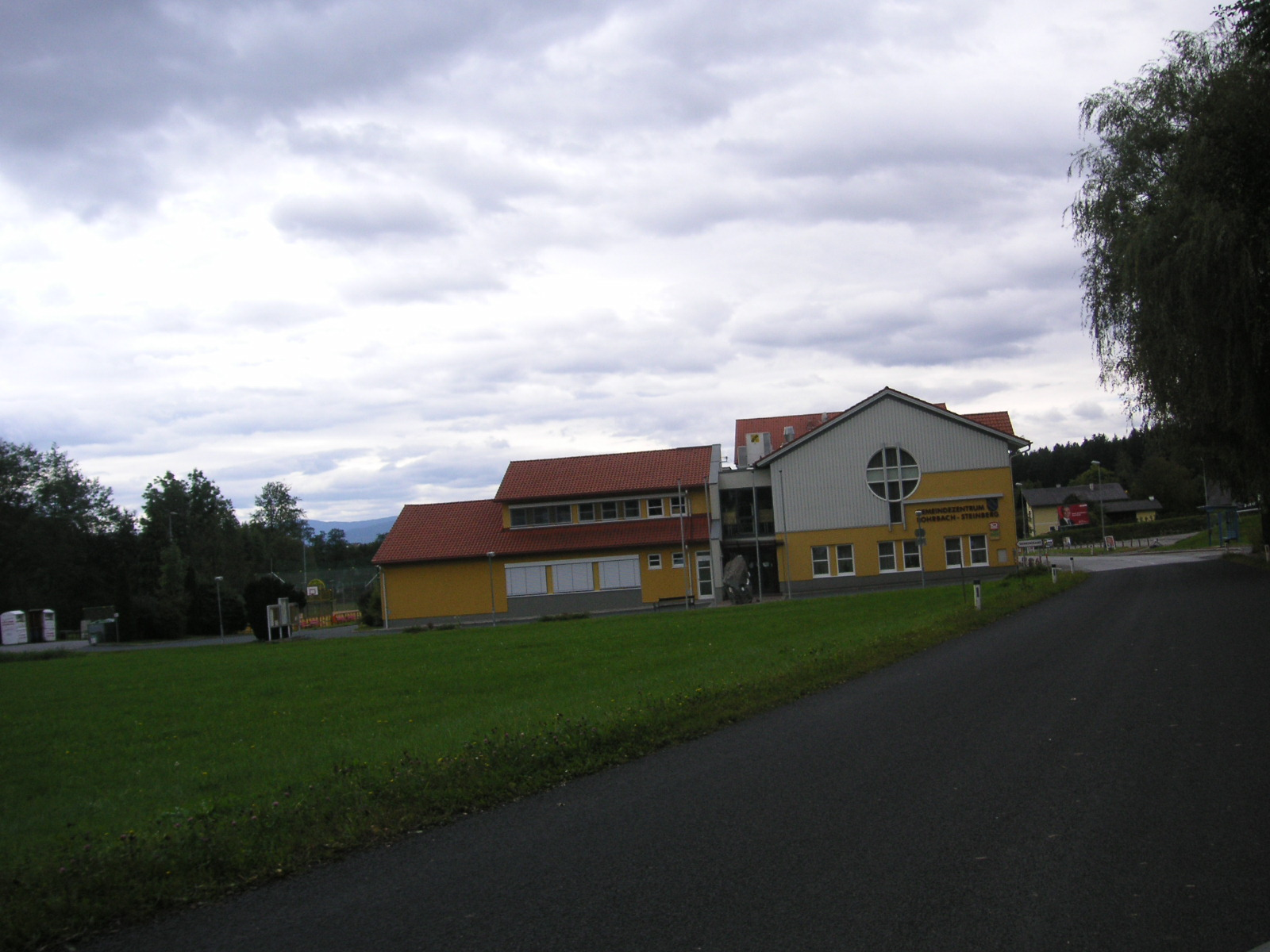
- Rohrbach-Steinberg town hall

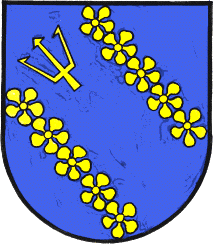
- Coat of arms

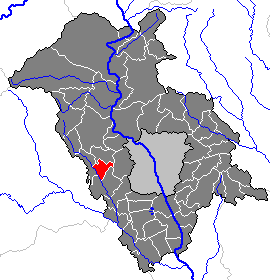
- Location within Graz-Umgebung district

- Location within Austria
- Coordinates: 47°03′44″N 15°17′44″E
- Country: Austria
- State: Styria
- District: Graz-Umgebung

Government
  - Mayor: Heribert Uhl (SPÖ)

Area
  - Total: 8.41 km^{2} (3.25 sq mi)
- Elevation: 405 m (1,329 ft)

Population (1 January 2016)
  - Total: 1,421
  - Density: 169/km^{2} (438/sq mi)
- Time zone: UTC+1 (CET)
  - Summer (DST): UTC+2 (CEST)
- Postal code: 8151
- Area code: 03123
- Vehicle registration: GU
- Website: www.rohrbach-steinberg.at

Rohrbach-Steinberg is a former municipality in the district of Graz-Umgebung in the Austrian state of Styria. Since the 2015 Styria municipal structural reform, it is part of the municipality Hitzendorf.

== Population ==
Historical population
Year	Pop.	±%
1869	800	—
1880	784	−2.0%
1890	774	−1.3%
1900	777	+0.4%
1910	730	−6.0%
1923	720	−1.4%
1934	732	+1.7%
1939	684	−6.6%
1951	739	+8.0%
1961	767	+3.8%
1971	903	+17.7%
1981	1,035	+14.6%
1991	1,177	+13.7%
2001	1,285	+9.2%
