= Vasoldsberg =

- Municipality
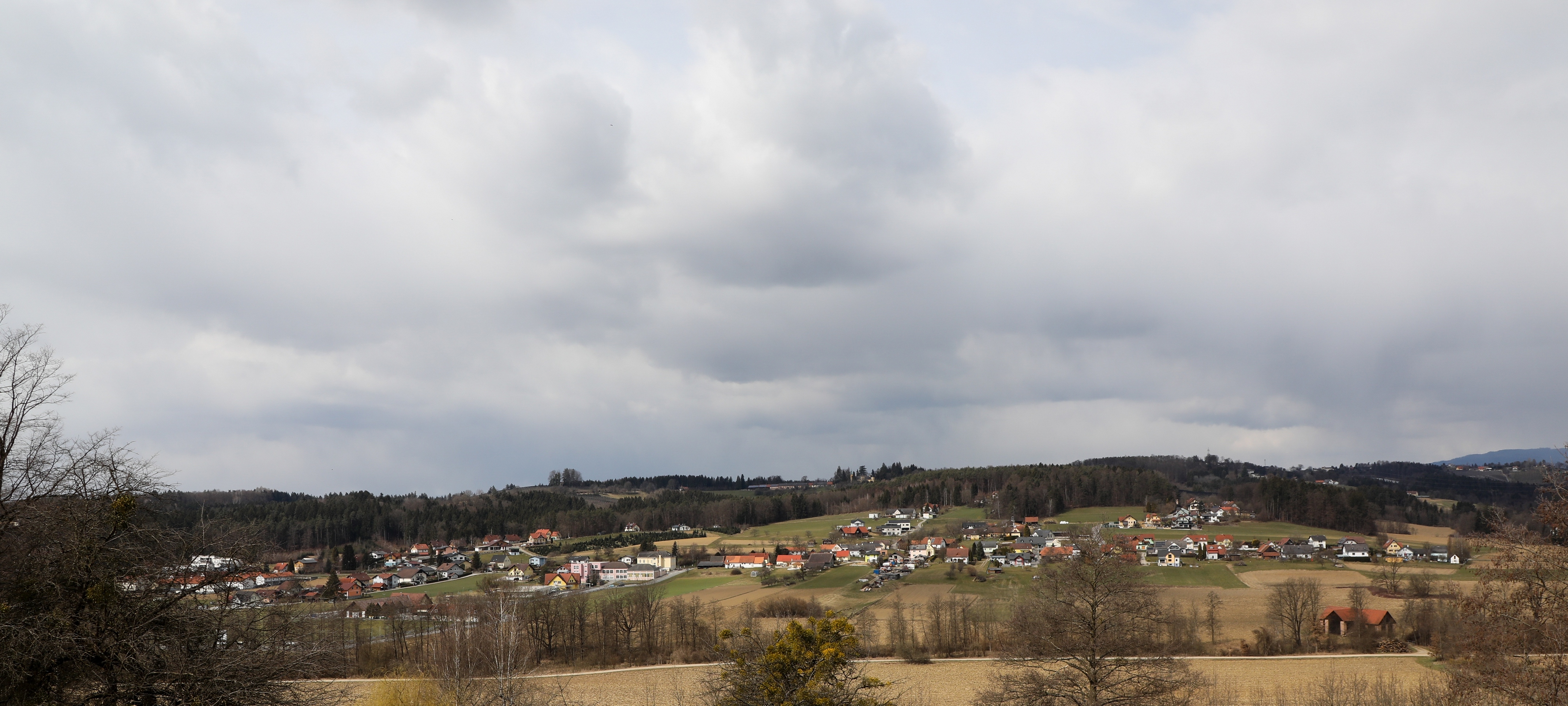
- Remote view of Vasoldsberg

- Coat of arms

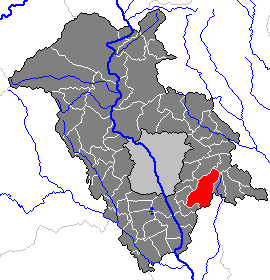
- Location within Graz-Umgebung district

- Location within Austria
- Coordinates: 47°00′48″N 15°33′23″E
- Country: Austria
- State: Styria
- District: Graz-Umgebung

Government
  - Mayor: Johann Wolf-Maier (ÖVP)

Area
  - Total: 27.96 km^{2} (10.80 sq mi)
- Elevation: 359 m (1,178 ft)

Population (2018-01-01)
  - Total: 4,572
  - Density: 163.5/km^{2} (423.5/sq mi)
- Time zone: UTC+1 (CET)
  - Summer (DST): UTC+2 (CEST)
- Postal code: 8076
- Area code: 03135, 0316, 03133, 03134
- Vehicle registration: GU
- Website: www.vasoldsberg.at

Vasoldsberg is a municipality in the district of Graz-Umgebung in the Austrian state of Styria.

== Population ==
Historical population
Year	Pop.	±%
1869	1,726	—
1880	1,800	+4.3%
1890	1,930	+7.2%
1900	1,856	−3.8%
1910	1,926	+3.8%
1923	1,864	−3.2%
1934	1,952	+4.7%
1939	1,854	−5.0%
1951	2,014	+8.6%
1961	2,106	+4.6%
1971	2,466	+17.1%
1981	3,011	+22.1%
1991	3,433	+14.0%
2001	3,838	+11.8%
2016	4,458	+16.2%
2019	4,606	+3.3%
