= Tyrnau =

- Former municipality
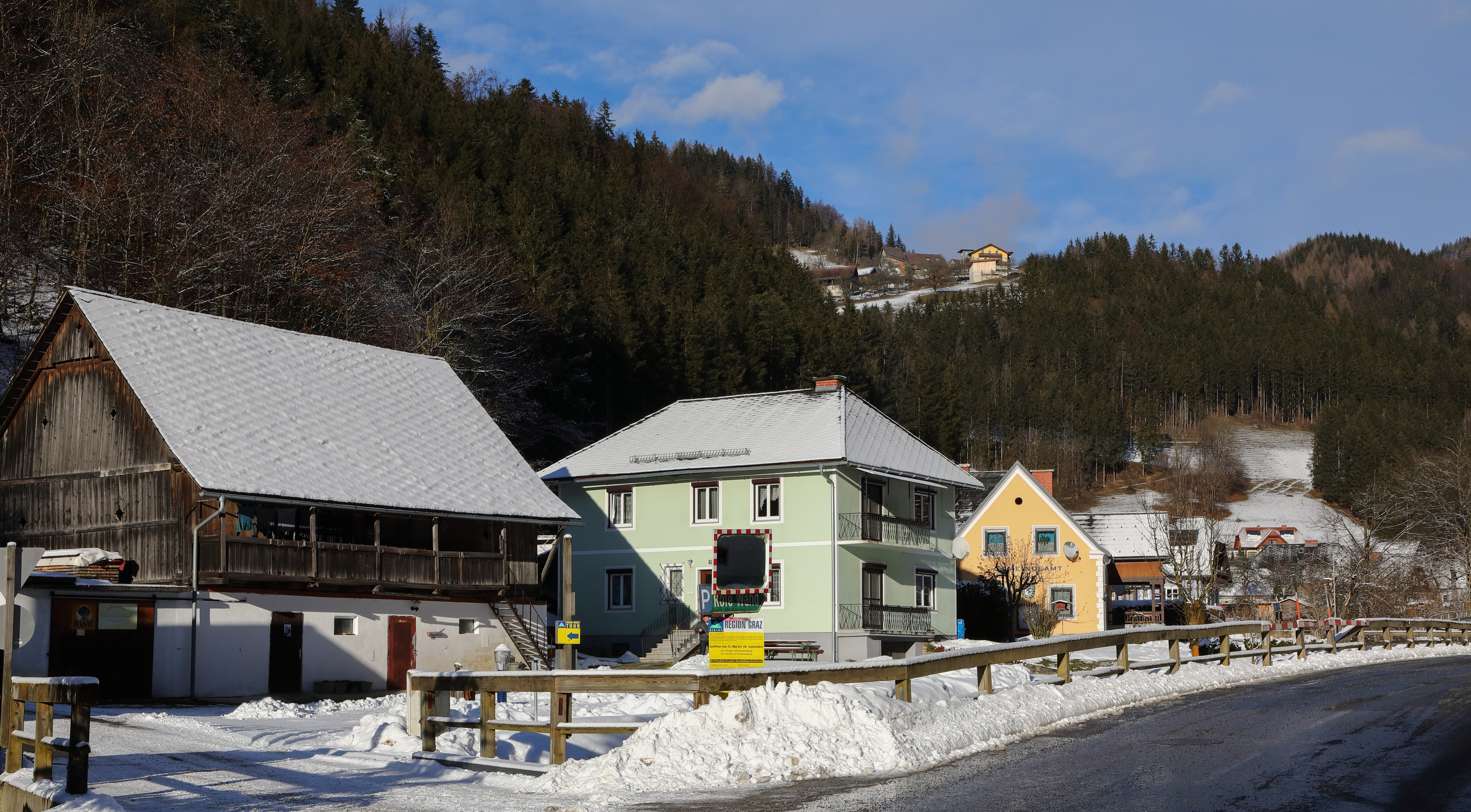
- View of Tyrnau

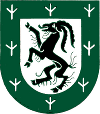
- Coat of arms

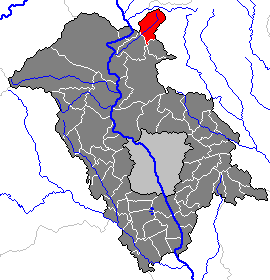
- Location within Weiz district

- Location within Austria
- Coordinates: 47°18′43″N 15°24′54″E
- Country: Austria
- State: Styria
- District: Weiz

Area
  - Total: 19.97 km^{2} (7.71 sq mi)
- Elevation: 666 m (2,185 ft)

Population (1 January 2016)
  - Total: 158
  - Density: 7.91/km^{2} (20.5/sq mi)
- Time zone: UTC+1 (CET)
  - Summer (DST): UTC+2 (CEST)
- Postal code: 8130
- Area code: 03179
- Vehicle registration: GU
- Website: www.tyrnau.steiermark.at

Tyrnau (German pronunciation: [ˈtʏʁnaʊ̯]) is a former municipality in the district of Graz-Umgebung in the Austrian state of Styria. Since the 2015 Styria municipal structural reform, it is part of the municipality Fladnitz an der Teichalm, in the Weiz District.

== Population ==
Historical population
Year	Pop.	±%
1869	413	—
1880	414	+0.2%
1890	353	−14.7%
1900	348	−1.4%
1910	288	−17.2%
1923	294	+2.1%
1934	321	+9.2%
1939	317	−1.2%
1951	284	−10.4%
1961	250	−12.0%
1971	191	−23.6%
1981	159	−16.8%
1991	166	+4.4%
2001	151	−9.0%
