= Hausmannstätten =

- Municipality
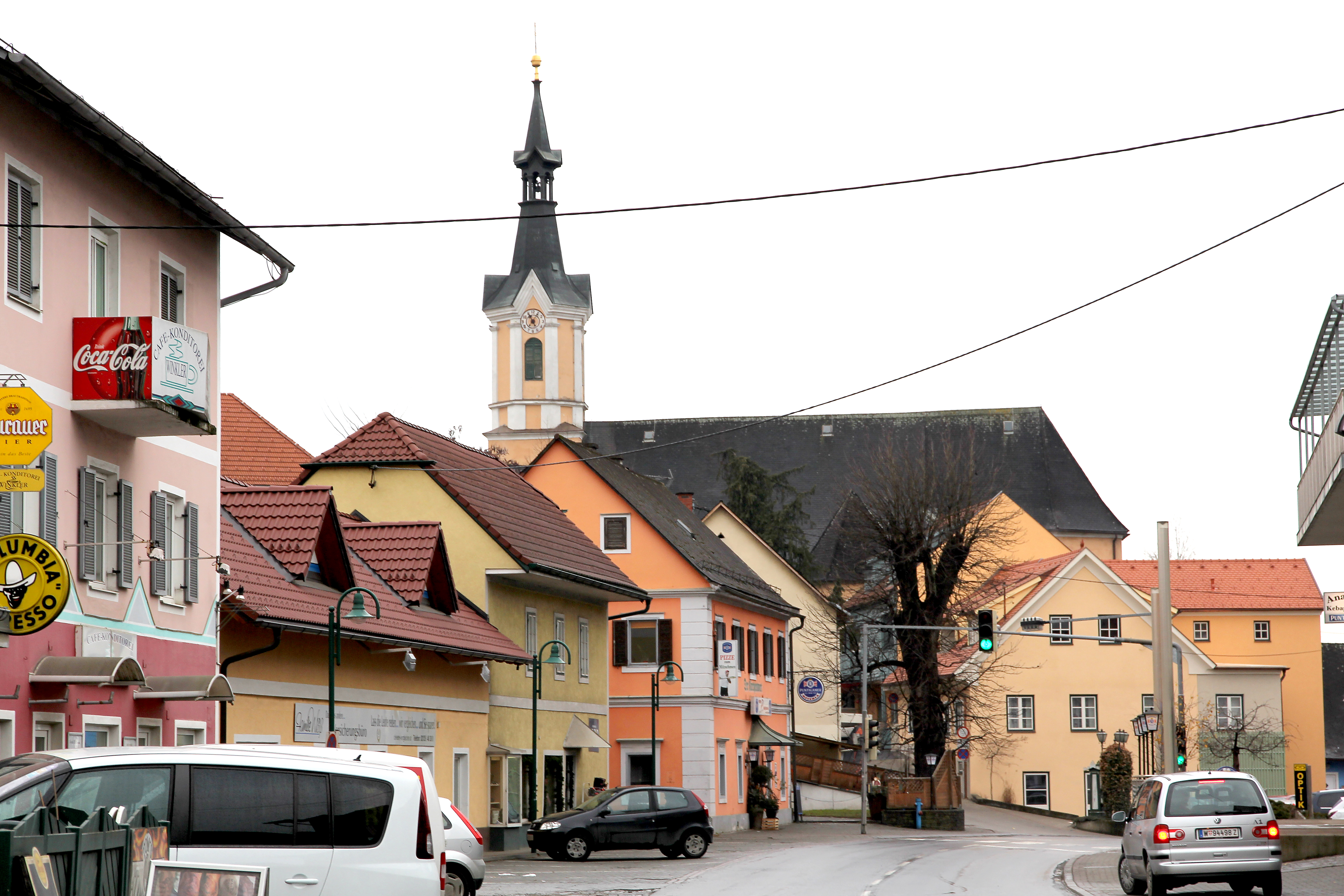
- Center of the town

- Coat of arms

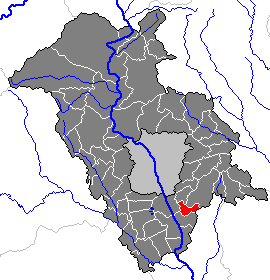
- Location within Graz-Umgebung district

- Location within Austria
- Coordinates: 46°59′27″N 15°30′31″E
- Country: Austria
- State: Styria
- District: Graz-Umgebung

Government
  - Mayor: Dipl.-Ing. Werner Kirchsteiger (ÖVP)

Area
  - Total: 6.81 km^{2} (2.63 sq mi)
- Elevation: 342 m (1,122 ft)

Population (2018-01-01)
  - Total: 3,288
  - Density: 483/km^{2} (1,250/sq mi)
- Time zone: UTC+1 (CET)
  - Summer (DST): UTC+2 (CEST)
- Postal code: 8071
- Area code: 03135
- Vehicle registration: GU
- Website: www.hausmannstaetten.at

Hausmannstätten (German: [ˌhaʊ̯smanˈʃ͡tɛtn̩]) is a municipality in the district of Graz-Umgebung in the Austrian state of Styria.

== Population ==
Historical population
Year	1869	1880	1890	1900	1910	1923	1934	1939	1951	1961	1971	1981	1991	2001
Pop.	645	690	696	724	743	712	752	724	788	831	1,412	1,754	2,005	2,456
±%	—	+7.0%	+0.9%	+4.0%	+2.6%	−4.2%	+5.6%	−3.7%	+8.8%	+5.5%	+69.9%	+24.2%	+14.3%	+22.5%
