= Hart bei Graz =

- Municipality
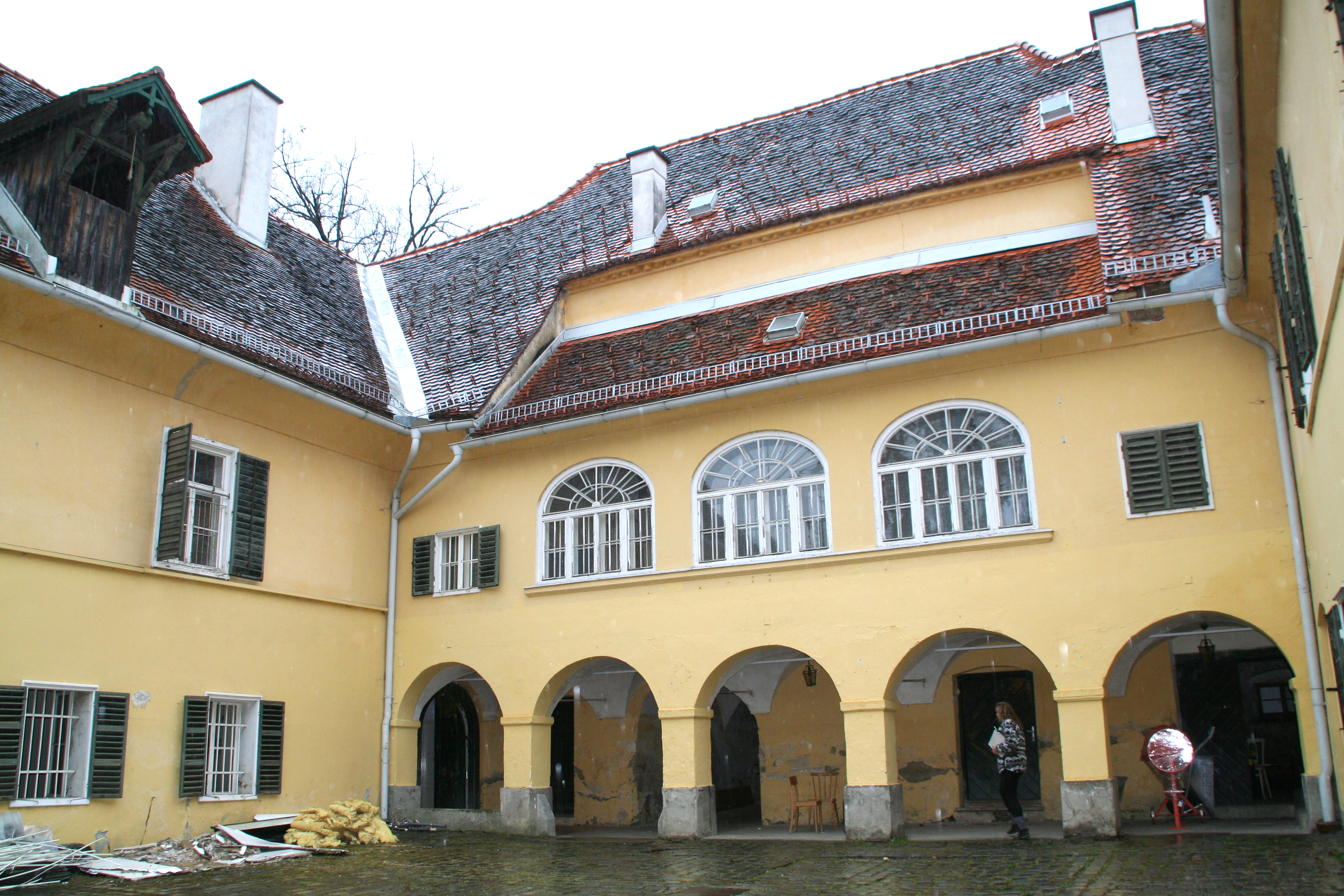
- Reinthal Castle

- Coat of arms

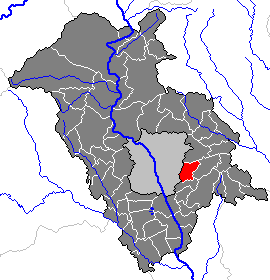
- Location within Graz-Umgebung district

- Location within Austria
- Coordinates: 47°02′42″N 15°31′12″E
- Country: Austria
- State: Styria
- District: Graz-Umgebung

Government
  - Mayor: Frey Jakob (Bürgerliste)

Area
  - Total: 11.01 km^{2} (4.25 sq mi)
- Elevation: 450 m (1,480 ft)

Population (2018-01-01)
  - Total: 4,972
  - Density: 451.6/km^{2} (1,170/sq mi)
- Time zone: UTC+1 (CET)
  - Summer (DST): UTC+2 (CEST)
- Postal code: 8075
- Area code: 0316
- Vehicle registration: GU
- Website: www.hartbeigraz.at

Hart bei Graz is a municipality in the district of Graz-Umgebung in the Austrian state Styria.

== Geography ==
Hart lies in the east Styrian hills between Graz and Laßnitzhöhe.

The municipality consists of the Katastralgemeinden of Messendorf and Hart bei Sankt Peter as well as the communities of Hart, Messendorf, and Pachern.

Near Hart lies the palace of Lustbühel and the Technische Universität Graz (TU Graz).
