= Großstübing =

- Former municipality
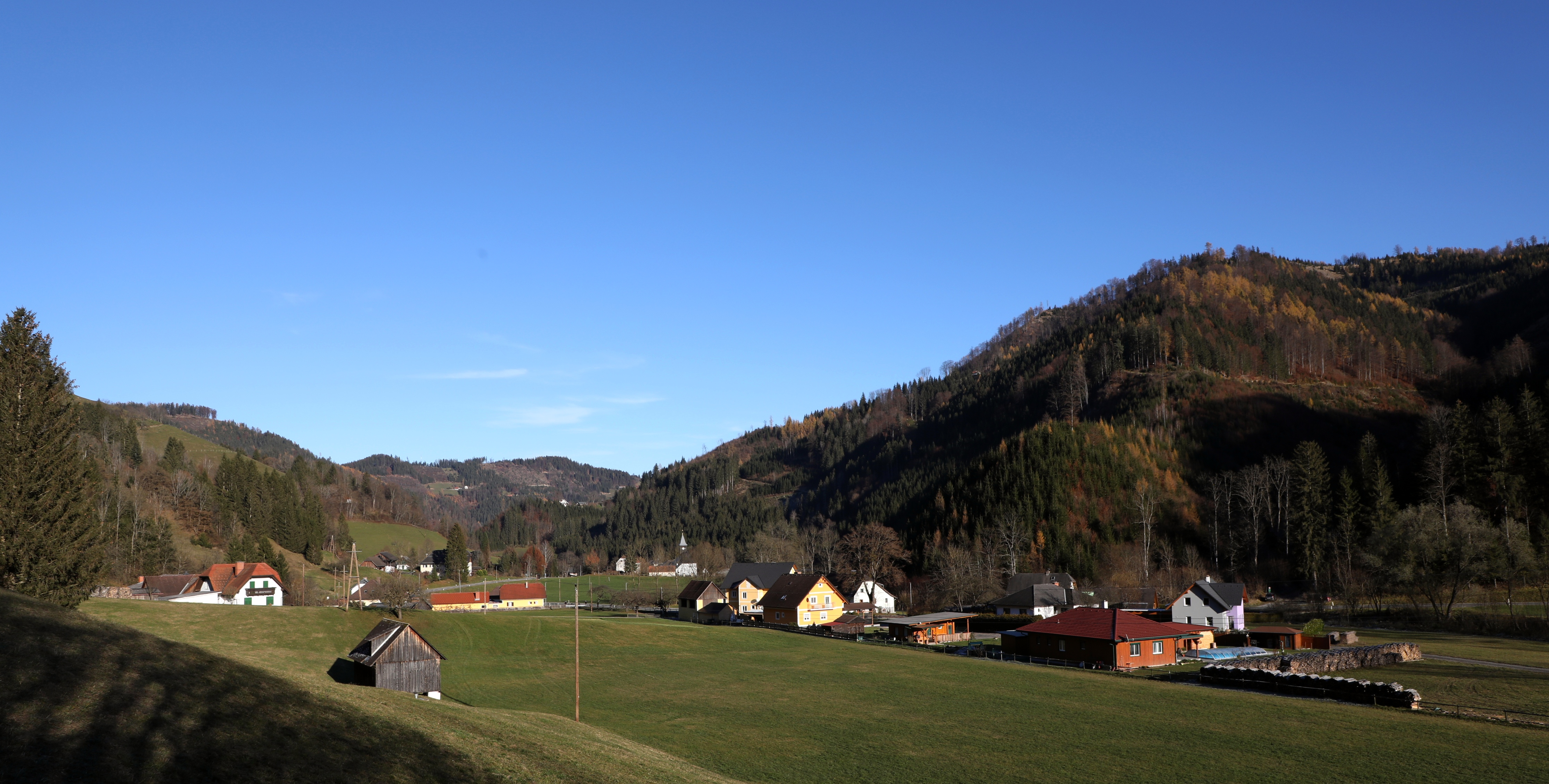
- Großstübing

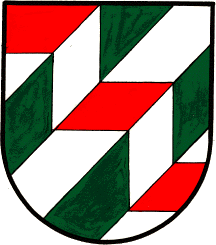
- Coat of arms

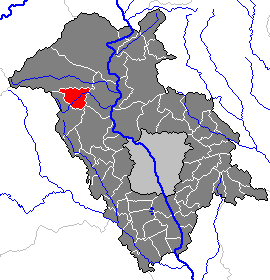
- Location within Graz-Umgebung district

- Location within Austria
- Coordinates: 47°11′33″N 15°14′05″E
- Country: Austria
- State: Styria
- District: Graz-Umgebung

Area
  - Total: 17.77 km^{2} (6.86 sq mi)
- Elevation: 543 m (1,781 ft)

Population (1 January 2016)
  - Total: 351
  - Density: 19.8/km^{2} (51.2/sq mi)
- Time zone: UTC+1 (CET)
  - Summer (DST): UTC+2 (CEST)
- Postal code: 8114, 8124
- Area code: 03125
- Vehicle registration: GU
- Website: www.grossstuebing. steiermark.at

Großstübing is a former municipality in the district of Graz-Umgebung in the Austrian state of Styria. Since the 2015 Styria municipal structural reform, it is part of the municipality Deutschfeistritz.

== Population ==
Historical population
Year	Pop.	±%
1869	664	—
1880	675	+1.7%
1890	681	+0.9%
1900	601	−11.7%
1910	595	−1.0%
1923	658	+10.6%
1934	597	−9.3%
1939	532	−10.9%
1951	519	−2.4%
1961	432	−16.8%
1971	407	−5.8%
1981	374	−8.1%
1991	377	+0.8%
2001	372	−1.3%
