= Werndorf =

- Municipality
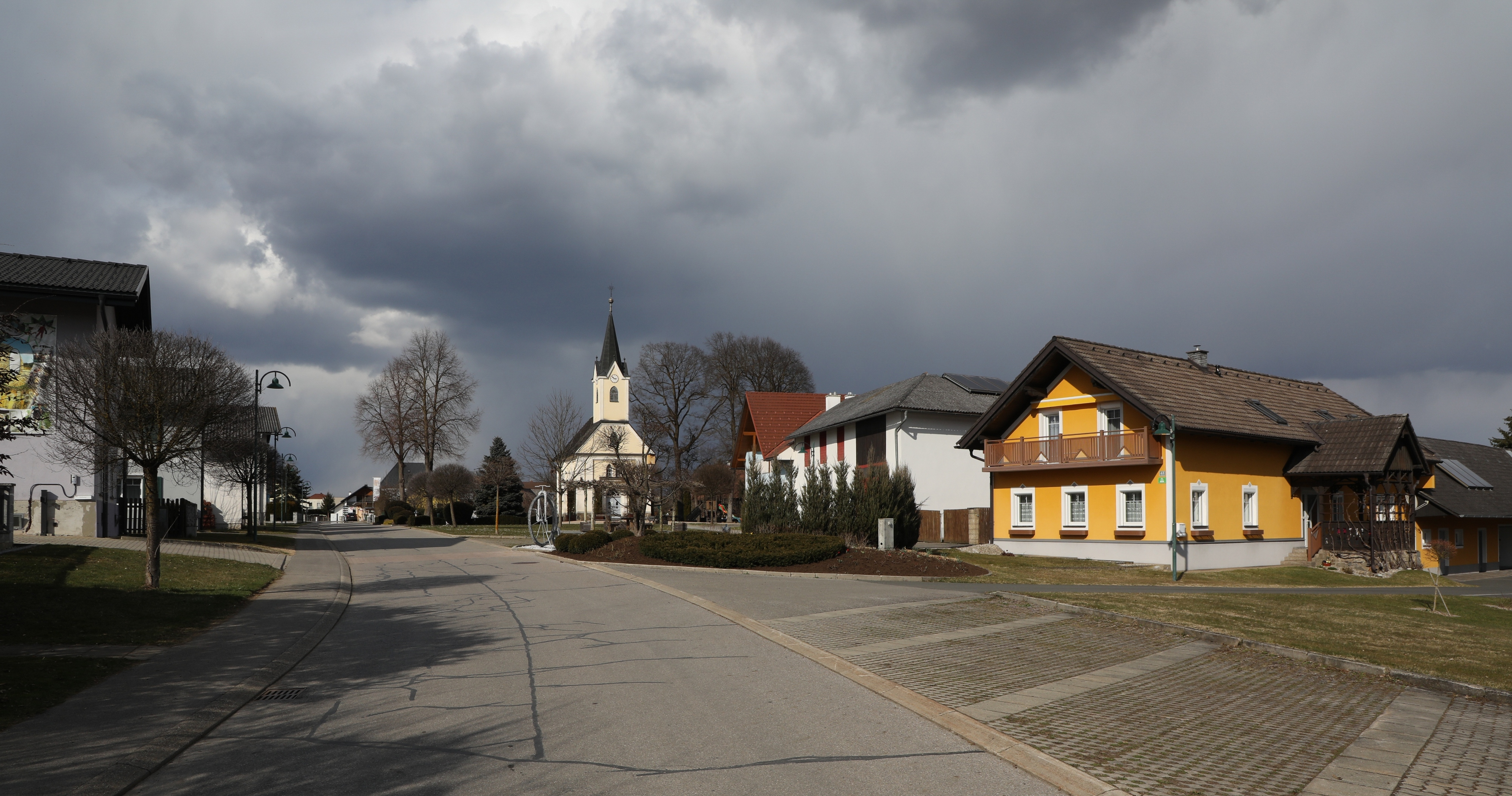
- Street in Werndorf

- Coat of arms

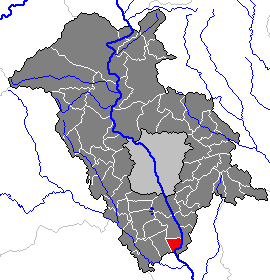
- Location within Graz-Umgebung district

- Location within Austria
- Coordinates: 46°55′16″N 15°28′52″E
- Country: Austria
- State: Styria
- District: Graz-Umgebung

Government
  - Mayor: Willibald Rohrer (SPÖ)

Area
  - Total: 6.23 km^{2} (2.41 sq mi)
- Elevation: 309 m (1,014 ft)

Population (2018-01-01)
  - Total: 2,365
  - Density: 380/km^{2} (983/sq mi)
- Time zone: UTC+1 (CET)
  - Summer (DST): UTC+2 (CEST)
- Postal code: 8402
- Area code: 03135
- Vehicle registration: GU
- Website: www.werndorf. steiermark.at

Werndorf is a municipality in the district of Graz-Umgebung in the Austrian state of Styria.

== Population ==
Historical population
Year	Pop.	±%
1869	336	—
1880	356	+6.0%
1890	340	−4.5%
1900	357	+5.0%
1910	381	+6.7%
1923	556	+45.9%
1934	598	+7.6%
1939	624	+4.3%
1951	738	+18.3%
1961	1,021	+38.3%
1971	1,446	+41.6%
1981	1,555	+7.5%
1991	1,632	+5.0%
2001	2,007	+23.0%
2008	2,116	+5.4%
