= Graz-Umgebung District =

Coordinates: 47.062°N 15.415°E

Graz-Umgebung District Bezirk Graz-Umgebung
- District
- Country: Austria
- State: Styria
- Number of municipalities: 36
- Administrative seat: Graz

Government
  - District Governor: Andreas Weitlaner

Area
  - Total: 1,084.55 km^{2} (418.75 sq mi)

Population (2023)
  - Total: 162,408
  - Density: 149.747/km^{2} (387.843/sq mi)
- Time zone: UTC+01:00 (CET)
  - Summer (DST): UTC+02:00 (CEST)
- Vehicle registration: GU
- NUTS code: AT221
- Website: bh-grazumgebung.steiermark.at

Bezirk Graz-Umgebung (German: [ɡʁaːt͡s umˈɡeːbuŋ], lit. Graz Surroundings) is a district of the state of Styria in Austria. It forms a continuous ring around Graz, the capital city of Styria and also the seat of the district commission.

Since the 2015 Styria municipal structural reform, it consists of the following municipalities:

- Deutschfeistritz
- Dobl-Zwaring
- Eggersdorf bei Graz
- Feldkirchen bei Graz
- Fernitz-Mellach
- Frohnleiten
- Gössendorf
- Gratkorn
- Gratwein-Straßengel
- Hart bei Graz
- Haselsdorf-Tobelbad
- Hausmannstätten
- Hitzendorf
- Kainbach bei Graz
- Kalsdorf bei Graz
- Kumberg
- Laßnitzhöhe
- Lieboch
- Nestelbach bei Graz
- Peggau
- Premstätten
- Raaba-Grambach
- Sankt Bartholomä
- Sankt Marein bei Graz
- Sankt Oswald bei Plankenwarth
- Sankt Radegund bei Graz
- Seiersberg-Pirka
- Semriach
- Stattegg
- Stiwoll
- Thal
- Übelbach
- Vasoldsberg
- Weinitzen
- Werndorf
- Wundschuh

Municipalities since 2015

== Municipalities before 2015 ==
Towns (Städte) are indicated in boldface; market towns (Marktgemeinden) in italics; suburbs, hamlets and other subdivisions of a municipality are indicated in small characters.

- Attendorf
  - Attendorfberg, Mantscha, Schadendorfberg, Södingberg, Stein
- Brodingberg
  - Brodersdorf, Haselbach, Affenberg
- Deutschfeistritz
  - Zitoll, Kleinstübing, Prenning, Waldstein
- Dobl
  - Muttendorf, Petzendorf, Weinzettl
- Edelsgrub
- Eggersdorf bei Graz
  - Edelsbach bei Graz
- Eisbach
  - Hörgas, Kehr und Plesch, Rein
- Feldkirchen bei Graz
  - Abtissendorf, Lebern, Wagnitz
- Fernitz
  - Gnaning
- Frohnleiten
  - Adriach, Badl, Brunnhof, Gams, Gamsgraben, Hofamt, Laas, Laufnitzdorf, Laufnitzgraben, Leutnant Günther-Siedlung, Maria Ebenort, Peugen, Pfannberg, Rothleiten, Schönau, Schrauding, Schweizerfabrik, Ungersdorf, Wannersdorf
- Gössendorf
  - Dörfla, Thondorf, Grambach
- Gratkorn
  - Forstviertel, Freßnitzviertel, Kirchenviertel, Sankt Veit, Unterfriesach
- Gratwein
- Großstübing
- Gschnaidt
- Hart bei Graz
  - Hart bei St. Peter, Messendorf
- Hart-Purgstall
  - Hart bei Eggersdorf
- Haselsdorf-Tobelbad
  - Badegg, Haselsdorf, Haselsdorfberg, Tobelbad
- Hausmannstätten
  - Berndorf
- Hitzendorf
  - Altenberg, Altreiteregg, Berndorf, Doblegg, Höllberg, Holzberg, Mayersdorf, Michlbach, Neureiteregg, Niederberg, Oberberg, Pirka
- Höf-Präbach
  - Höf, Präbach
- Judendorf-Straßengel
  - Hundsdorf, Judendorf, Kugelberg, Rötz, Straßengel
- Kainbach bei Graz
  - Hönigtal, Kainbach, Schaftal
- Kalsdorf bei Graz
  - Forst, Großsulz, Kleinsulz, Thalerhof
- Krumegg
  - Kohldorf
- Kumberg
  - Kumberg, Gschwendt, Hofstätten, Rabnitz
- Langegg bei Graz
  - Hirtenfeld, Kogelbuch, Lambach, Langegg-Ort, Mittergoggitsch, Obergoggitsch, Unterbuch, Zaunstein
- Laßnitzhöhe
- Lieboch
  - Schadendorf, Spatenhof
- Mellach
  - Dillach, Enzelsdorf
- Nestelbach bei Graz
  - Mitterlaßnitz
- Peggau
  - Friesach
- Pirka
  - Windorf
- Raaba
  - Dürwagersbach
- Röthelstein
- Rohrbach-Steinberg
  - Rohrbach, Steinberg
- Sankt Bartholomä
  - Jaritzberg, Lichtenegg, Reiteregg
- Sankt Marein bei Graz
  - Sankt Marein bei Graz-Markt, Sankt Marein bei Graz-Umgebung
- Sankt Oswald bei Plankenwarth
  - Plankenwarth
- Sankt Radegund bei Graz
  - Willersdorf, Kickenheim, Diepoltsberg, Ebersdorf, Rinnegg, Schöckl
- Schrems bei Frohnleiten
  - Gschwendt, Schrems
- Seiersberg
  - Gedersberg, Neuseiersberg
- Semriach
  - Markterviertl, Präbichl, Rechberg, Schönegg, Thoneben, Windhof
- Stattegg
  - Buch, Eichberg, Hochgreit, Hohenberg, Hub, Kalkleiten, Krail, Leber, Mühl, Neudorf, Rannach, Steingraben, Ursprung
- Stiwoll
- Thal bei Graz
- Tulwitz
  - Tulwitzdorf, Tulwitzviertl
- Tyrnau
  - Nechnitz
- Übelbach
  - Kleintal, Land-Übelbach, Markt-Übelbach, Neuhof
- Unterpremstätten
  - Hautzendorf, Oberpremstätten
- Vasoldsberg
  - Breitenhilm, Ferbesdorf, Schelchenberg, Schelchental, Premstätten bei Vasoldsberg, Birkengreith, Birkendorf, Steinberg, Wiesental, Kühlenbrunn, Wagersbach, Wagersfeld, Aschenbachberg, Aschenbachtal
- Weinitzen
  - Fölling, Niederschöckl, Oberschöckl
- Werndorf
- Wundschuh
  - Forst, Gradenfeld, Kasten, Ponigl
- Zettling
  - Bierbaum, Laa
- Zwaring-Pöls
  - Dietersdorf, Fading, Lamberg, Pöls an der Wieserbahn, Steindorf, Wuschan, Zwaring
