= Sankt Marein bei Graz =

- Municipality
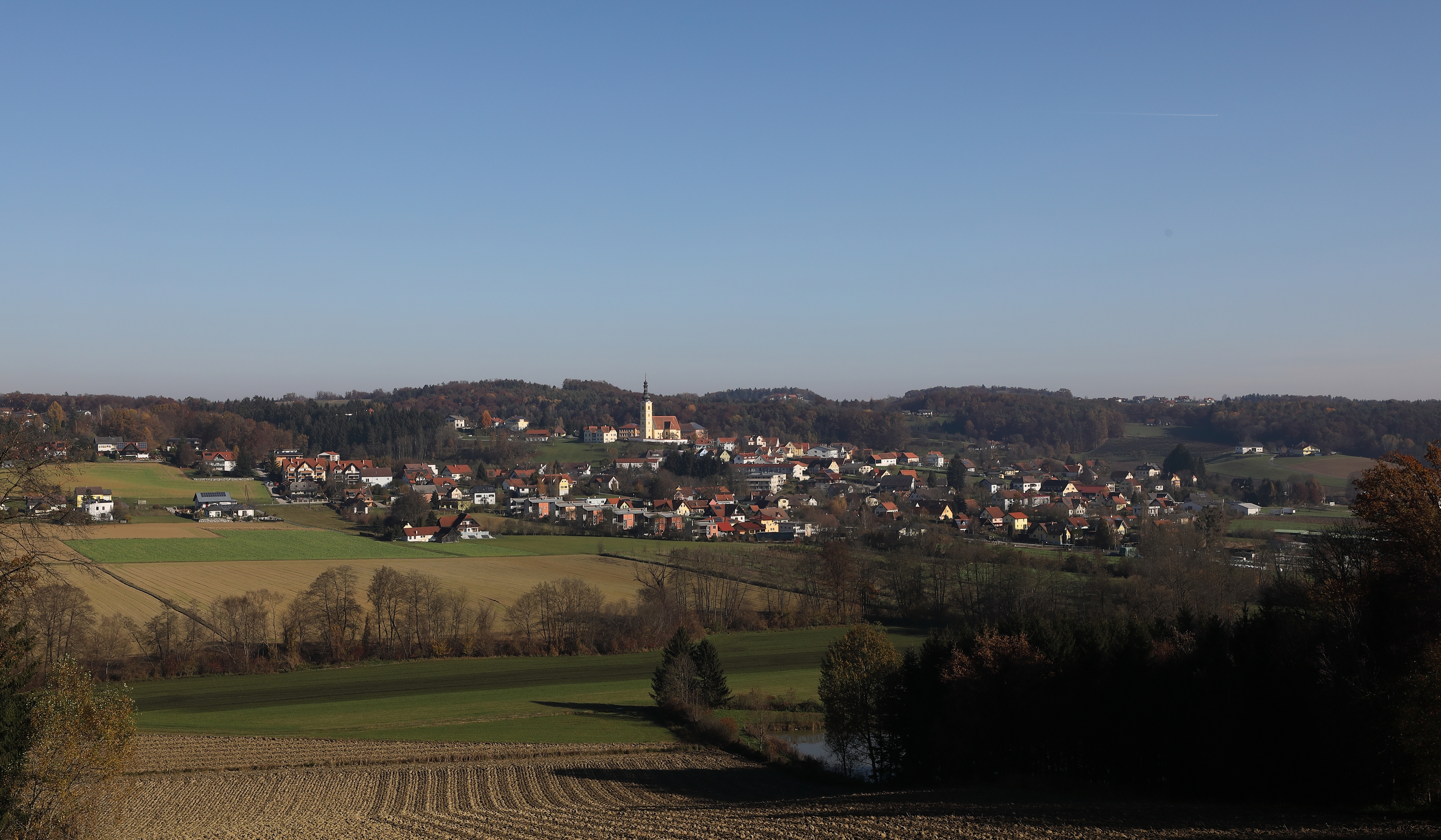

- Coat of arms

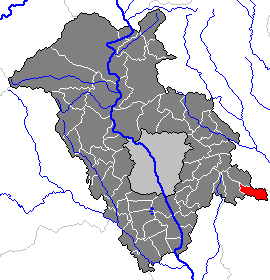
- Location within Graz-Umgebung district

- Location within Austria
- Coordinates: 47°00′56″N 15°41′15″E
- Country: Austria
- State: Styria
- District: Graz-Umgebung

Government
  - Mayor: Johann Puchmüller (ÖVP)

Area
  - Total: 41.57 km^{2} (16.05 sq mi)
- Elevation: 398 m (1,306 ft)

Population (2018-01-01)
  - Total: 3,675
  - Density: 88.41/km^{2} (229.0/sq mi)
- Time zone: UTC+1 (CET)
  - Summer (DST): UTC+2 (CEST)
- Postal code: 8323
- Area code: 03119
- Vehicle registration: GU
- Website: https://www.st-marein-graz.gv.at/

Sankt Marein bei Graz is a municipality in the district of Graz-Umgebung in the Austrian state of Styria.

== Population ==
Historical population
Year	Pop.	±%
1869	930	—
1880	1,004	+8.0%
1890	1,013	+0.9%
1900	1,016	+0.3%
1910	1,081	+6.4%
1923	991	−8.3%
1934	1,048	+5.8%
1939	1,089	+3.9%
1951	1,110	+1.9%
1961	1,090	−1.8%
1971	1,067	−2.1%
1981	1,042	−2.3%
1991	1,086	+4.2%
2001	1,198	+10.3%
