= Nestelbach bei Graz =

- Municipality
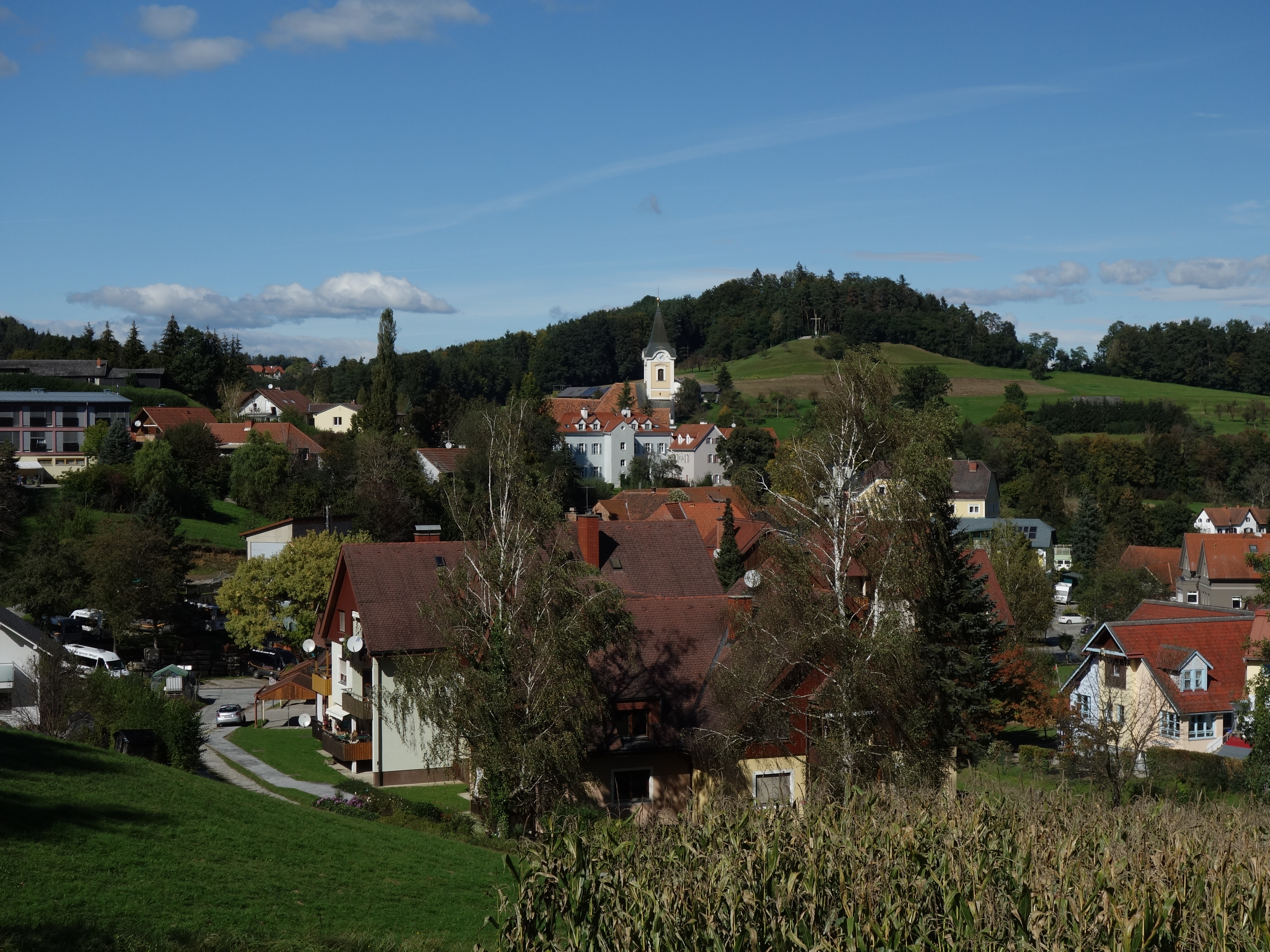
- View of Nestelbach

- Coat of arms

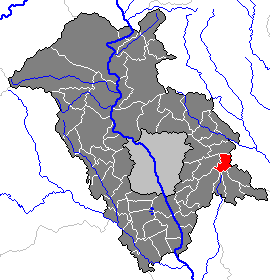
- Location within Graz-Umgebung district

- Location within Austria
- Coordinates: 47°03′44″N 15°36′30″E
- Country: Austria
- State: Styria
- District: Graz-Umgebung

Government
  - Mayor: Franz Roth (Nestelbach) (ÖVP)

Area
  - Total: 27.19 km^{2} (10.50 sq mi)
- Elevation: 450 m (1,480 ft)

Population (2018-01-01)
  - Total: 2,648
  - Density: 97.39/km^{2} (252.2/sq mi)
- Time zone: UTC+1 (CET)
  - Summer (DST): UTC+2 (CEST)
- Postal code: 8302
- Area code: 03133
- Vehicle registration: GU
- Website: https://www.nestelbach-graz.gv.at/

Nestelbach bei Graz is a municipality in the district of Graz-Umgebung in the Austrian state of Styria.

== Population ==
Historical population
Year	Pop.	±%
1869	612	—
1880	658	+7.5%
1890	662	+0.6%
1900	665	+0.5%
1910	638	−4.1%
1923	707	+10.8%
1934	754	+6.6%
1939	722	−4.2%
1951	834	+15.5%
1961	841	+0.8%
1971	819	−2.6%
1981	839	+2.4%
1991	1,049	+25.0%
2001	1,132	+7.9%
2011	1,900	+67.8%
