= Eggersdorf bei Graz =

- Municipality
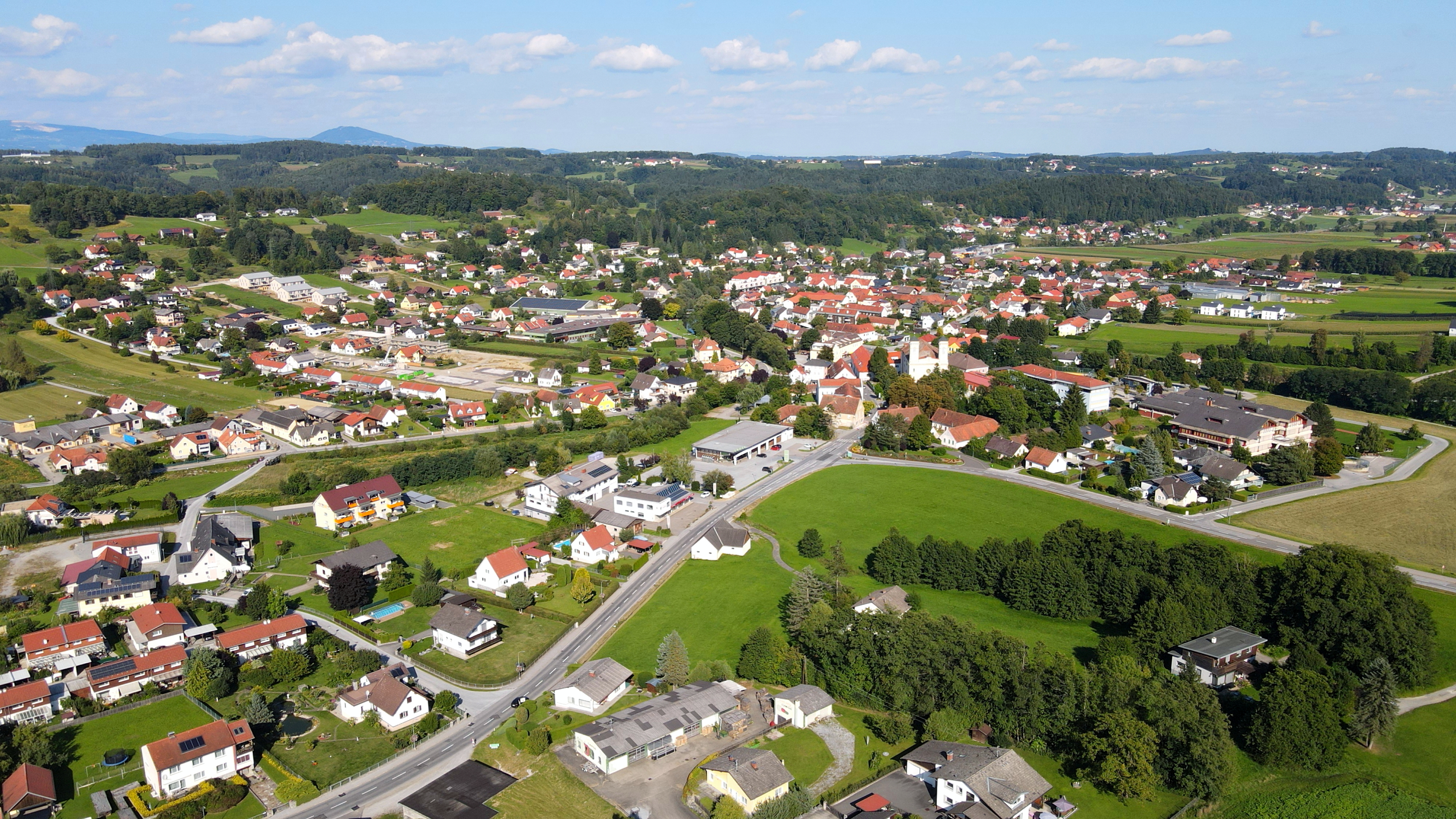

- Coat of arms

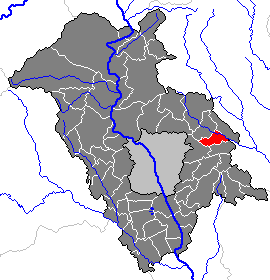
- Location within Graz-Umgebung district

- Location within Austria
- Coordinates: 47°07′22″N 15°35′57″E
- Country: Austria
- State: Styria
- District: Graz-Umgebung

Government
  - Mayor: Johann Zaunschirm (ÖVP)

Area
  - Total: 49.21 km^{2} (19.00 sq mi)
- Elevation: 410 m (1,350 ft)

Population (2018-01-01)
  - Total: 6,620
  - Density: 135/km^{2} (348/sq mi)
- Time zone: UTC+1 (CET)
  - Summer (DST): UTC+2 (CEST)
- Postal code: 8063
- Area code: 03117
- Vehicle registration: GU
- Website: www.eggersdorf-graz.at

Eggersdorf bei Graz is a municipality in the district of Graz-Umgebung in the Austrian state of Styria.

== Population ==
Historical population
Year	Pop.	±%
1869	1,051	—
1880	1,098	+4.5%
1890	1,147	+4.5%
1900	1,147	+0.0%
1910	1,023	−10.8%
1923	1,205	+17.8%
1934	1,318	+9.4%
1939	1,261	−4.3%
1951	1,152	−8.6%
1961	1,218	+5.7%
1971	1,364	+12.0%
1981	1,450	+6.3%
1991	1,713	+18.1%
2001	1,918	+12.0%
