= Kaiserwald (Styria) =

Forest area in Styria, Austria

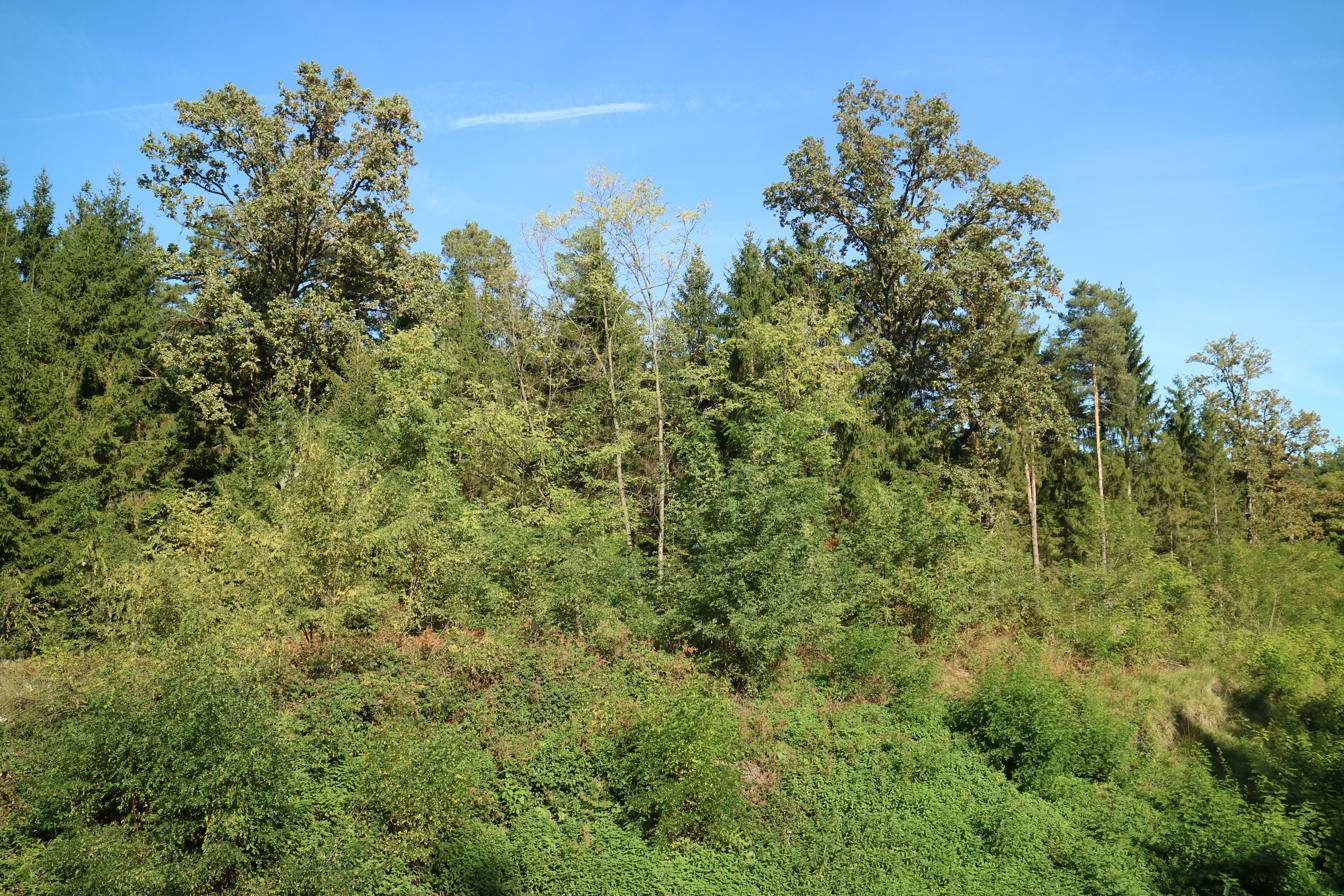
Mixed forest in the market town of Premstätten

The Kaiserwald is a forest area in the Austrian province of Styria, a few kilometers south-southwest of the provincial capital of Graz. Its geological location, the Kaiserwald Terrace, is a clay-covered glacial gravel plateau above the Grazer field. The clay cap, which in the past enabled a local brick industry, provides a characteristic groundwater hydrology. Botanically, it is a mixed forest with pines and oaks as the dominant trees, providing a habitat for a wide variety of animal species and serving as a princely forest for centuries. The area is also significant for its numerous Roman burial mounds.

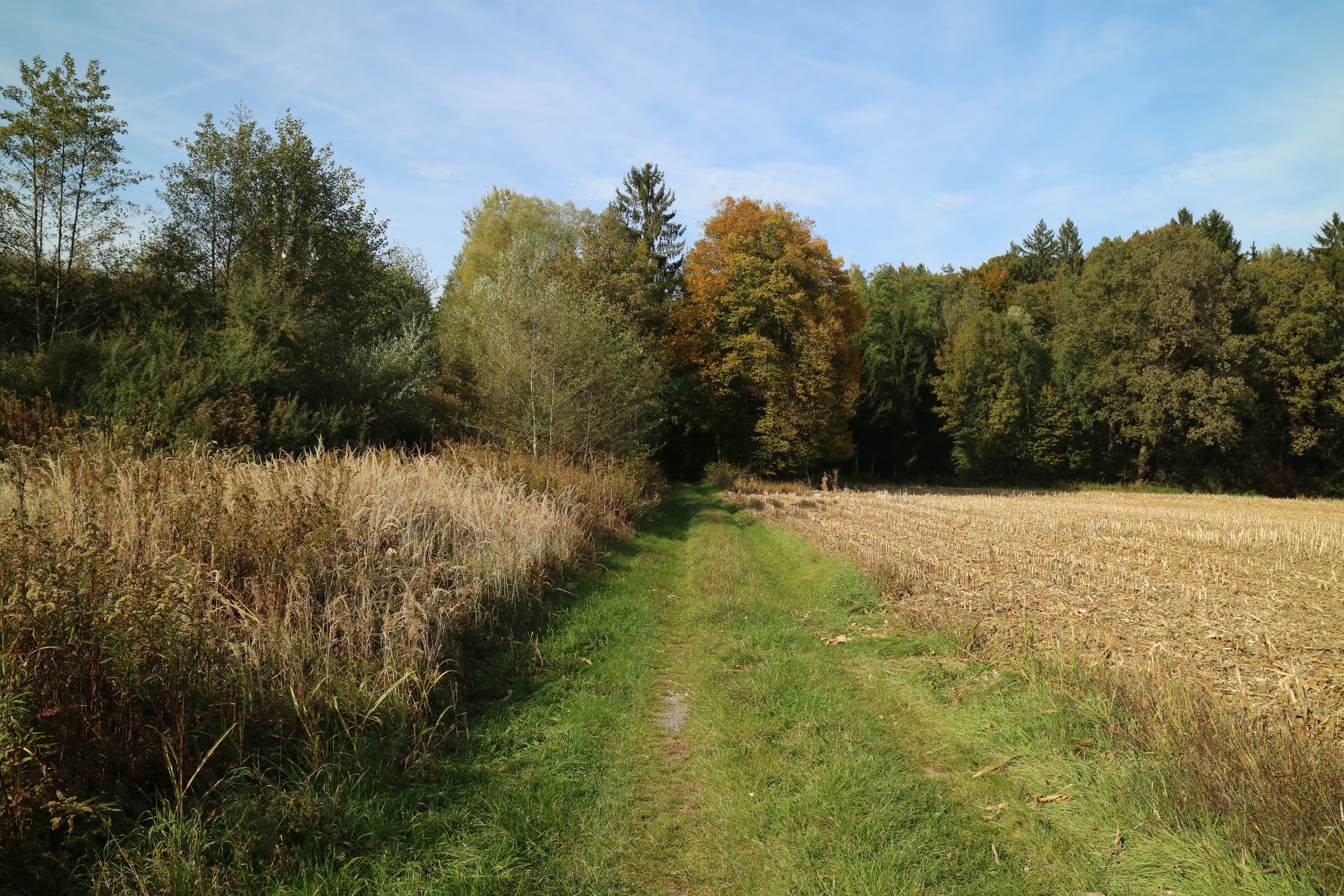
Forest edge near Weitendorf

During the Second World War, the Kaiserwald was the site of armament activities of the German Armed Forces. Today, large parts of the 30-square-kilometer forest serve as recreational areas and commercial forests. Parts of the forest have been designated as protected areas. Due to its ecological and climatic relevance, the forest is anchored as a green zone in the local development concepts of the surrounding communities. With the Graz-Köflach railway (GKB) and the A2 South motorway, two important traffic routes cross the Kaiserwald.

== Geography ==
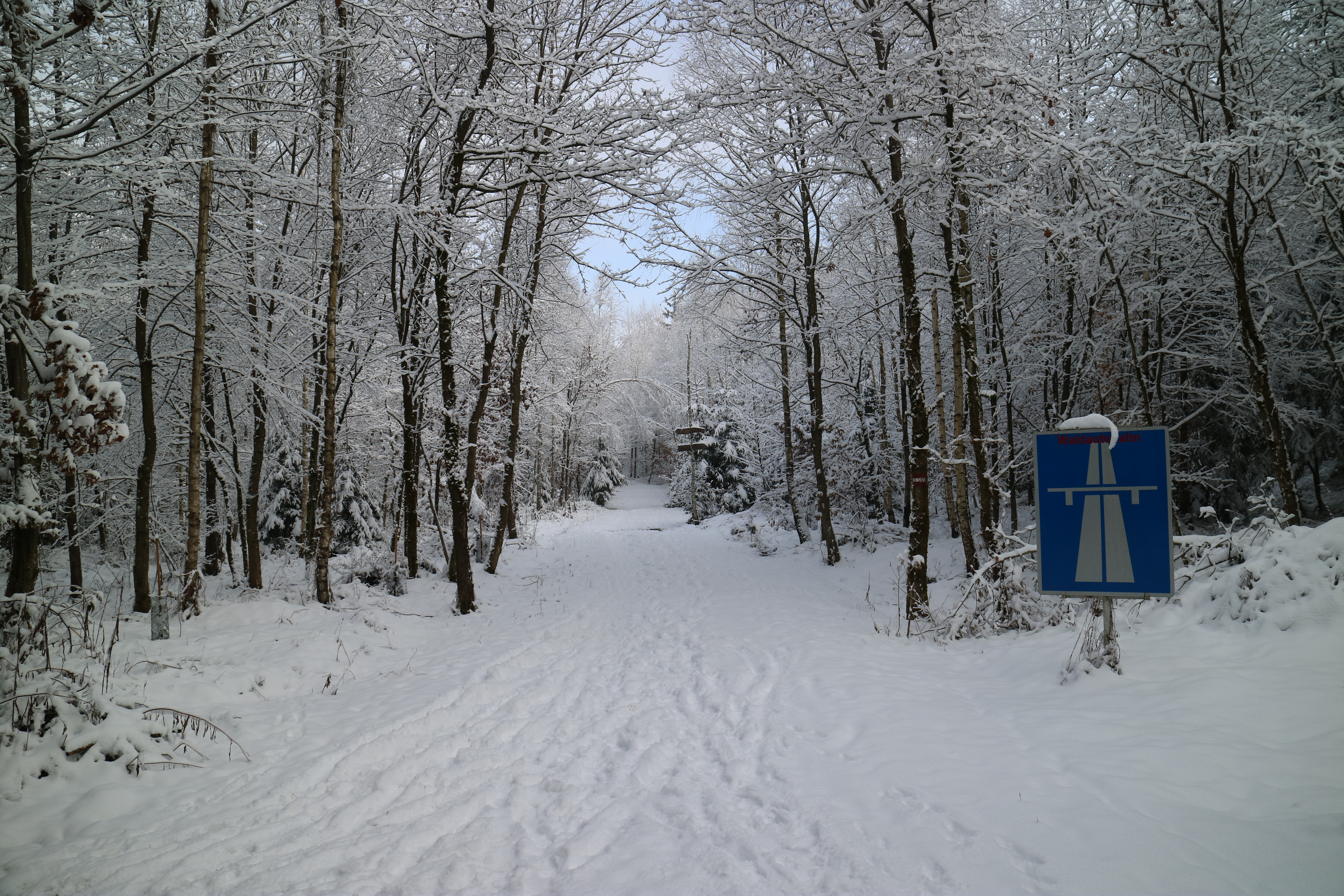
Forest path in a winter coat

=== Location and surroundings ===
Location within Styria

The Kaiserwald is located in the region of Western Styria. In the south, it borders on the foothills of the Plabutsch-Buchkogel mountain range and the Western Styria Hügelland, and in the east, it runs parallel to the Grazer Feld (Murtal). To the west and south, the Kaiserwald terrace is bordered by the lower Kainachtal. The geomorphologic boundary lies in the north at about 365 m (1,197 ft 6 in) above sea level, where the terrain is directly divided, and in the northwest in the Spatenhof area.

It is difficult to draw a historically accurate boundary to the north and northwest. Until the forest was sold in the 19th

century, some of the land on the other side of Packer Street was also owned by the prince and was called Kaiserwald. The forest stretches about 13 kilometers in a northwest–southeast direction and is 1.5 to 2.5 kilometers wide. The total area is about 30 square kilometers, including the enclosed farmland. The center of Graz is located about nine kilometers from the northeastern edge of the forest near Pirka.

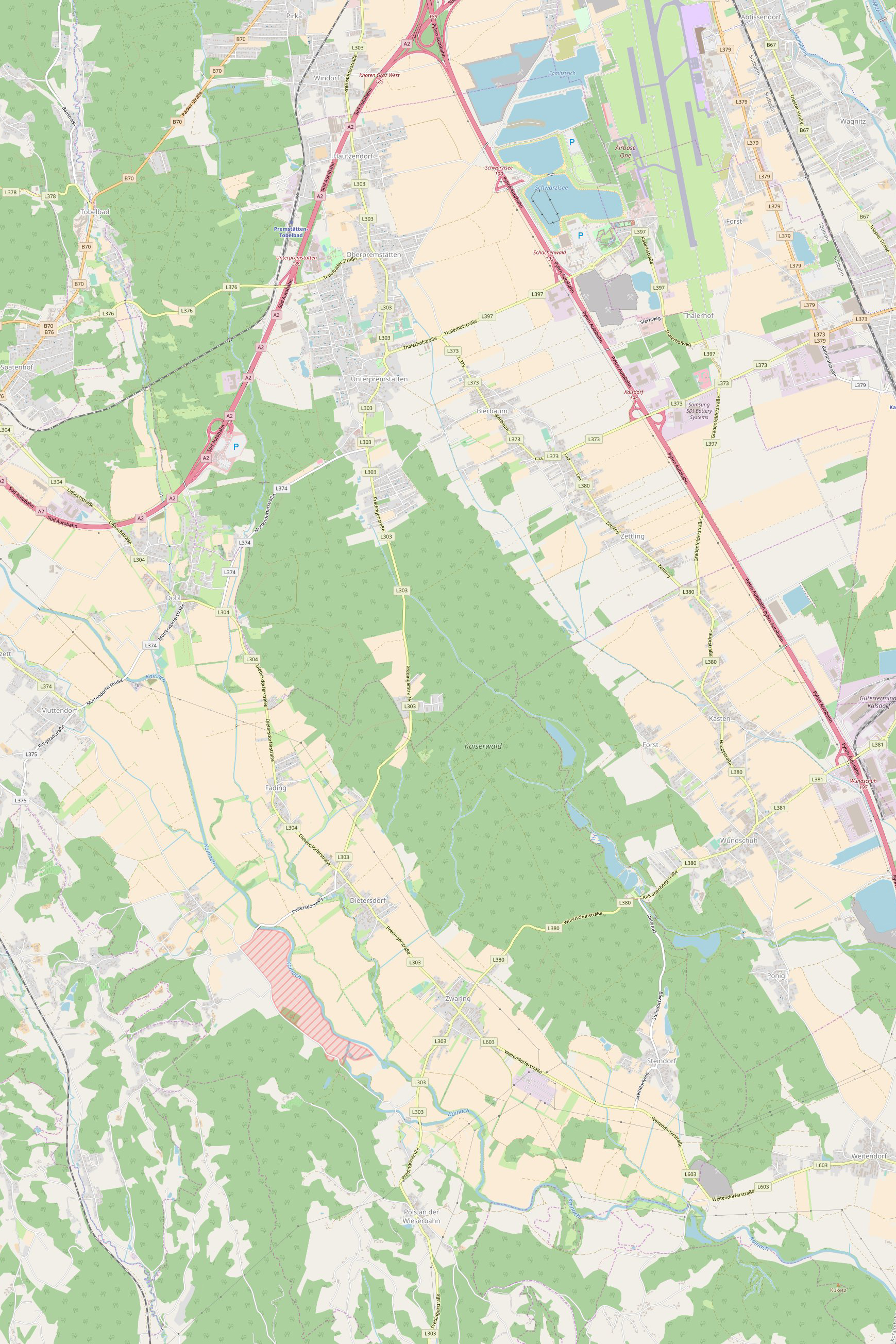
Overview map (OSM)

The following municipalities (from north to south) are part of the Kaiserwald:

- Seiersberg-Pirka
- Haselsdorf-Tobelbad
- Premstätten
- Lieboch
- Dobl-Zwaring
- Wundschuh
- Wildon

=== Geology ===
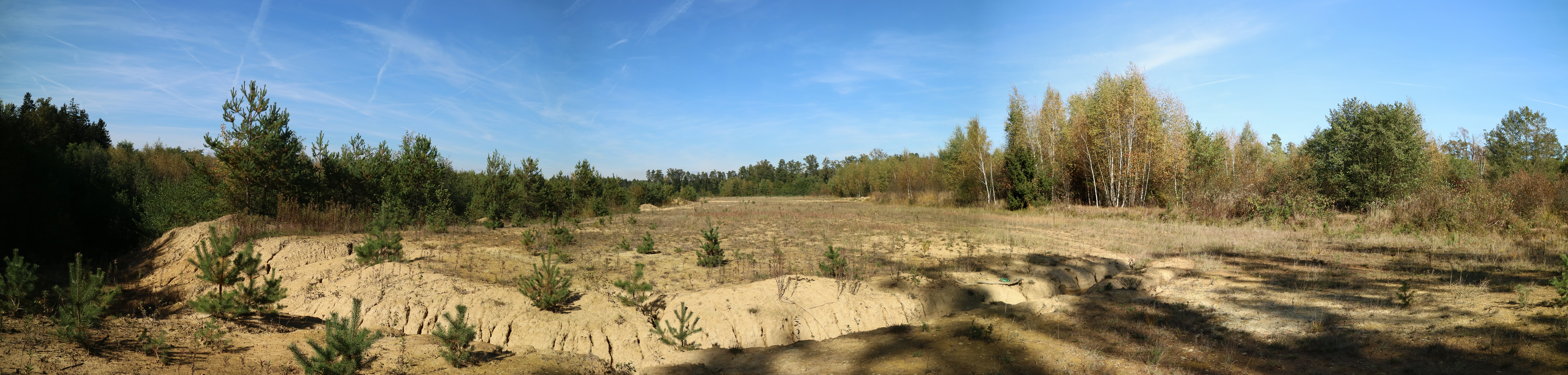
Exposed, heavily eroded clay cap in the former Unterpremstätten clay pit, looking northwest

The Kaiserwald Terrace is a plateau dissected by gullies that is morphologically and geologically distinct from its surroundings. On average, the terrace rises 27 meters above the Grazer field and 35 meters above the Kainachtal valley. Numerous boreholes, wells, and slope fractures have revealed a gravel terrace covered by loam of varying thickness. Due to ongoing erosive processes, only about 55 percent of the Kaiserwald terrace has the character of a plateau, while the remainder has steeper slopes and therefore less sediment thickness.

Arthur Winkler-Hermaden dated the landform to the Gunz and Mindel glaciation periods of the Pleistocene and interpreted the clay cap as an interglacial loam formation. At the eastern edge of the Kaiserwald terrace are younger terrace remnants, e.g. between Windorf and Hautzendorf from the Riss glaciation, remnants of which can also be found in Graz-Wetzelsdorf. The southeastern continuation of the Kaiserwald terrace between Steindorf, Ponigl, and Weitendorf is only ten meters above the level of the Würm main terrace (Grazer Field) and was assigned to the Helfbrunn level by Winkler-Hermaden. While the Pleistocene origin of the gravel terrace is now considered certain, Julius Fink invalidated the Aeolian clay theory. He interpreted the loams as multiphase aeolian drifts from the nearby gravel fields of the Mur. Loess samples with different quartz and feldspar proportions also indicate this.

The gravel body with an average thickness of 13 meters and silty-sandy admixtures consist of gneiss, crystalline schist, pegmatite, amphibolite, and quartz. Carbonate rocks are absent from the partly strongly weathered gravel. X-ray diffraction studies also revealed kaolinite as a product of feldspar weathering. The clay cap, with varying proportions of clay, silt, and sand, has an average thickness of six meters, although this varies greatly, and is divided by fossil soil horizons. The boundary between the two layers is sometimes fluid. As a result of relatively high rainfall, pseudogleyes have formed, which are unusable for agriculture.

The brick industry used clay roof tiles for a long time. In 1869, on the initiative of Ferdinand Portugall, the first factory was built in Unterpremstätten, which developed into the First Premstätten Interlocking brick factory Anton Haas & Co. founded in 1893. At its peak, between 150 and 200 workers produced more than seven million roof tiles per year. In the early 1970s, the plant was still producing four million tiles a year. During construction work in Weitendorf, a more than 10,000-year-old molar of a woolly mammoth (Mammuthus primigenius) was found in the clay and gravel deposits.

At the southern end of the Kaiserwald is the Weitendorf basalt quarry, where a small part of an up to 40 meter thick basalt layer is exposed. It extends over an area of about ten square kilometers between Weitendorf and Wundschuh. The quarry is located in the area of Weitendorf on the one hand and in the area of Wundschuh on the other hand, where the volcanite was found in the 1950s and 1960s during drilling at a depth of 25 to 35 meters.

=== Hydrology and hydrogeology ===
Due to the water-accumulating clay cap, runoff on the Kaiserwald terrace is largely above ground. The dominant watercourses, the Gepringbach and the Poniglbach, contribute to the strongly furrowed morphology of the plateau. While the Poniglbach erodes the gravel complex, the Gepringbach cuts deep into the bedrock. The gravel body, which has a low water flow due to its high clay content, rests on a base of young Tertiary fine sediments, the upper edge of which extends above the level of the Würm terraces surface. Numerous overflow springs were mapped at this boundary in the mid-1970s.

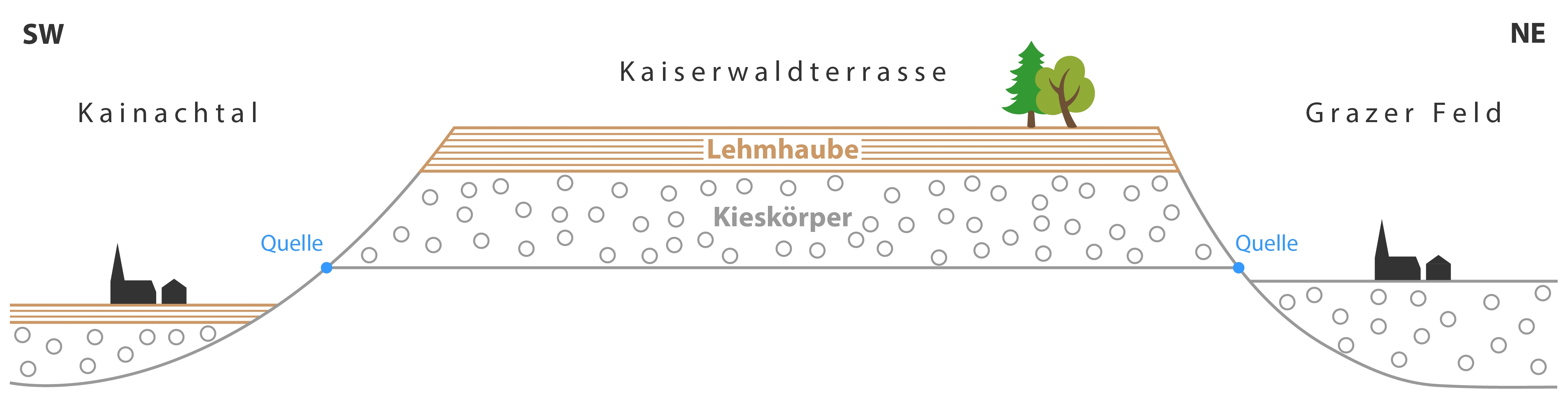
Schematic section through the Kaiserwald Terrace

A total of 36 springs are distributed along the southern part of the terrace. While on the southwest side, the springs are continuously discharged at a height of seven to eight meters above the valley floor of the Kainach, in the east they only occur between Premstätten and Wundschuh, where the Wurm terrace directly adjoins the Kaiserwald terrace. The investigation of three selected springs revealed discharge rates of about 1.5 l/s. As the clay cap largely prevents leachate and good mixing in the aquifer, the low variation in discharge can be explained by the uniform inflow. After heavy rainfall, meteoric water often accumulates in ponds and lowlands in the Kaiserwald. Groundwater recharge occurs in the extreme north of the terrace by infiltration from the southern foothills of the Florianiberg, where the Kaiserwald terrace is in direct contact with the dolomitic--sandstone sequence and coarse clastic loose sediments of the Graz Highlands. In the south, the relatively high-temperature fluctuations of the springs mentioned above have led to infiltration through the surface channels, which break up sand and gravel in the course of their erosive activity. This connection is important in terms of water management since the perennial inflow ensures regular water extraction. In addition, the clay cover provides good protection against groundwater contamination, which is often characterized by high iron content and oxygen deficiency.

=== Climate ===
The Kaiserwald is part of the climate region Grazer field with the lower Kainachtal, which is characterized by a continental climate with average annual temperatures of about 8.7 °C - the January average is -2.4 °C, the July average is 19.1 °C - and annual precipitation of about 833 mm at the ZAMG station Graz Airport. The growing season (average temperature ≥ 5 °C) lasts on average 230 days from the beginning of March to the beginning of November. The relative sunshine duration, which varies depending on the location, averages 42 percent throughout the year.

In terms of local climate, however, the terrace differs considerably from the Grazer Feld. In terms of climatic suitability, the Kaiserwald Terrace is more suitable for residential and commercial development than the lower-lying Würm Main Terrace, mainly due to the lower risk of inversion. However, due to the local occurrence of cold air, the favorable thermal conditions are limited, which leads to the classification as a "less favorable terrace location". However, a clear advantage over the immediate surroundings is the frequency of fog, which at 70 to 100 days per year is low compared to the nearby airport (149 days). At the Helfbrunn level between Steindorf, Ponigl, and Weitendorf, this effect is limited. The Kaiserwald terrace is also characterized by low to moderate aeration with an annual mean wind speed of 1.5 meters per second. As in the entire Graz Basin, the main wind direction is northwest. Special conditions concerning fog, cold air, and flow conditions prevail in the Gepringbach and Doblbach gullies, as well as in some smaller side gullies with low wind shear. In the Doblbachtal, cold air can accumulate along the GKB railway embankment and the highway.

As a climate-impacting area, the Kaiserwald makes a valuable contribution to sustainable spatial development at the regional level.

== Flora and fauna ==
=== Flora ===
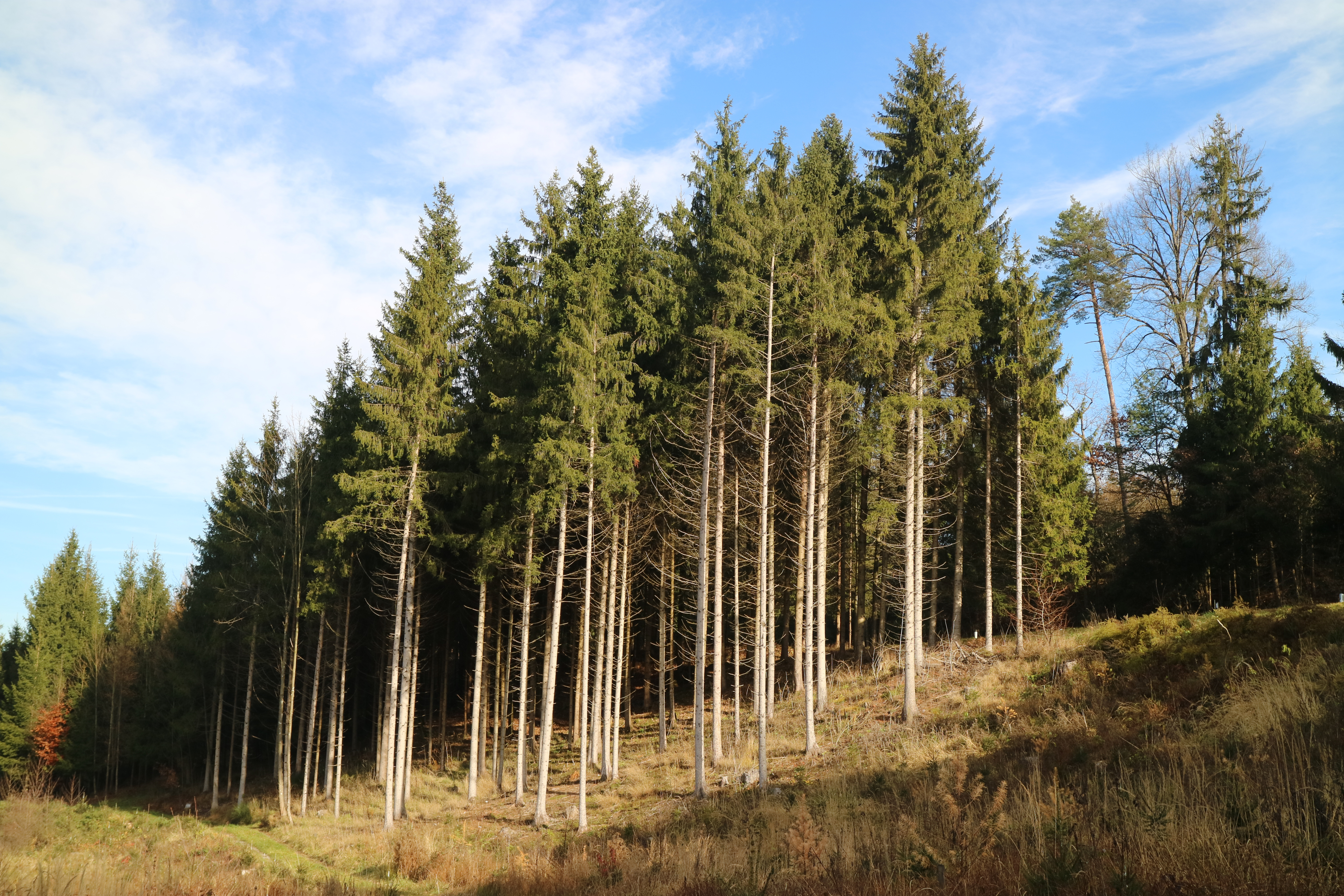
Spruce monoculture between Unterpremstätten and Dobl

In terms of stand structure and species composition, the Kaiserwald largely corresponds to the potential natural forest types of the region. In between there are some spruce monocultures, while in other places the largely closed forest area shows traces of former litter use. Overall, the dominant plant community is the pine-pedunculate oak forest, rich in moor grass, on moist, acidic, gleyed soils, where beech, birch, black alder, rowan and wild cherry also occur. The herb layer is made up of dense stands of moor grass, heather, blueberry, and cranberry. The moss layer is made up of bryophytes, bryozoans, fork mosses, white mosses, and even bog mosses, which benefit from acidic soil conditions.

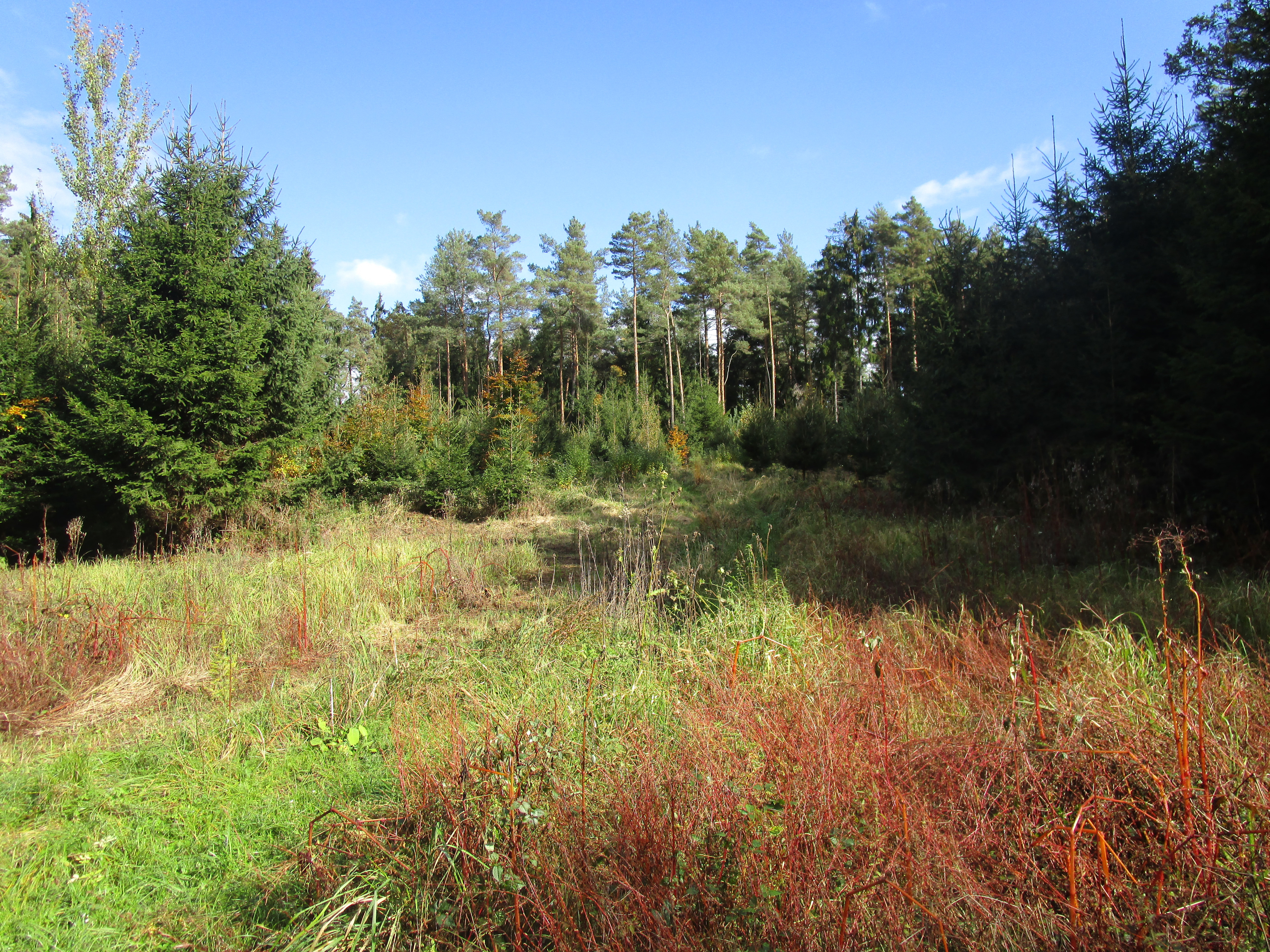
Clear-cut flora with a balsam south of Pirka

The tertiary Tobelbader Berg is an exception from a phytosociological point of view. It is dominated by a mixed pine forest rich in blueberries, with stands of Scots pine interspersed with spruce and common beech. The English oak takes a back seat to the sweet chestnut. Deciduous trees dominate the undergrowth, while the herbaceous layer is made up of blueberries, bracken, blackberries, cranberries, various brooms, heather, cow wheat, forest hawkweed, reed grass, wavy hair-grass, and narrow-leaved woodrush. In spring, lilies of the valley and butterfly orchids appear in places.

In some places, there is a clear-cut succession. The herbaceous layer is supplemented by bentgrasses, common rush, eared willow, wild basil, and tormentil. Neophytes such as balsam and Canadian goldenrod are also present. Special conditions also prevail along the numerous streams and ponds. The undergrowth of black carr, interspersed with gray alder, ash, and white birch, is complemented by bioindicators such as stinging nettle, flowering plants, meadowsweet, marsh marigold, ragged-robin, plume thistle, marsh hawk's-beard, water forget-me-not, and herb Paris. In addition to black alder, English oak and birch, various species of willow and common guelder rose can be found on the slopes of the clay pits. These are the pioneer species of bog forest communities.

On the road from Zettling to the Kaiserwald, Josef Eggler discovered in 1927 the presence of the round-leaved sundew, an insect-trapping bog plant, on very wet patches of peat moss, but this could not be confirmed in the recent past.

=== Fauna ===
In addition to the typical forest fauna, with roe deer as the most common representative, the Kaiserwald is home to several bird species, including the goldcrest and the oriole. In the past there was also a population of capercaillie. After being driven out by culling, 30 capercaillies were counted annually around 1940. It is said that Frederick the Quarrelsome had the Gjaidhof hunting lodge decorated with hundreds of capercaillies and, according to tradition, even Emperor Maximilian made a detour to Dobl to shoot capercaillies.

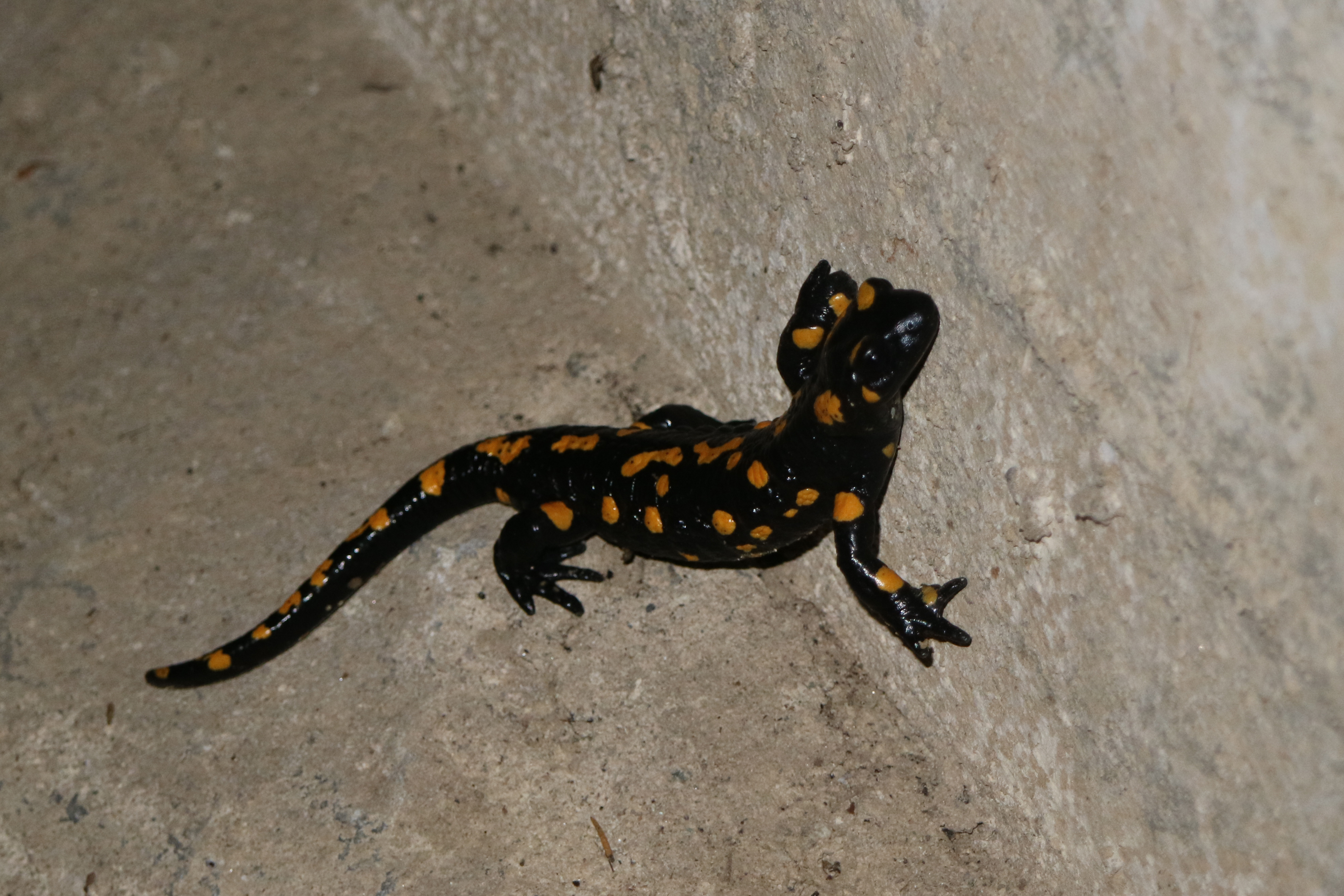
Fire salamander (Salamandra salamandra) in a culvert

The natural streams, such as the meandering Gepringbach, provide valuable habitat for flat worms, caddisflies, crayfish, river shrimp and, when there is sufficient water, brook trout, river trout and brook lamprey. Occasionally, broad-winged damselflies and dragonflies can be found. Special attention was paid to the brick ponds near Unterpremstätten, now a nature reserve (see Nature and Landscape Protection), where amphibians such as true frogs, moor frogs, crested newts, newts, common toads and tree frogs can be found. Breeding birds include mallards and coots, while grey herons and night herons are occasionally seen feeding. The ponds also provide habitat for several species of dragonflies. Between 1964 and 1972, 35 species of net-winged insects were counted in the entire Kaiserwald. In 2005, evidence of the highly endangered ilex hairstreak was found on the Forstriegel near Zettling. The forest is also home to at least 25 different species of longhorn beetles.

Research on tick-borne encephalitis, which began in 1969, identified the Kaiserwald, along with Mortantsch and Rötschgraben (municipality of Semriach), as one of three epidemic hotspots in Styria, i.e. areas with virus-transmitting ticks and infected small mammals.

== History ==
=== Archaeological findings ===
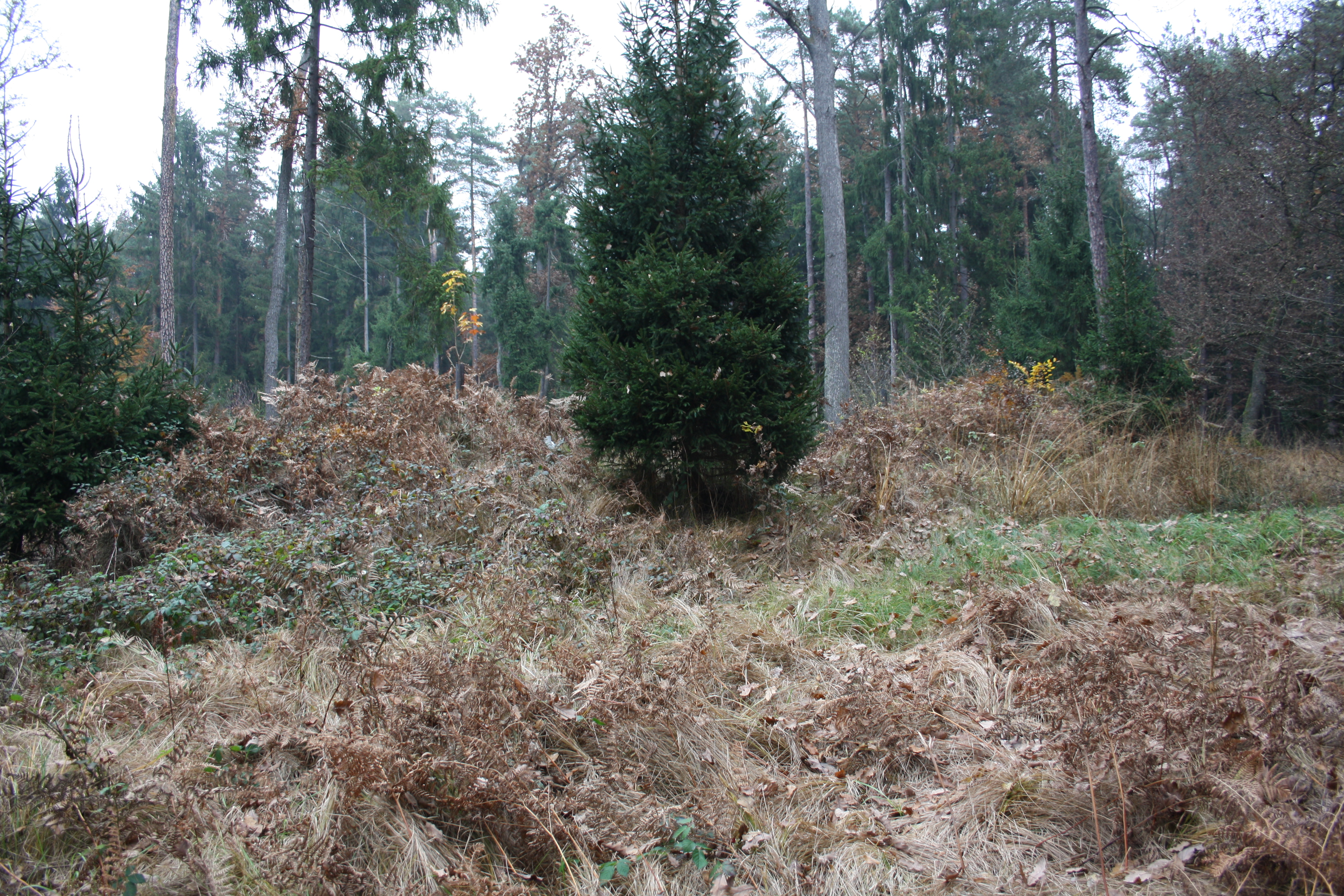
Burial mounds between Premstätten and Lieboch

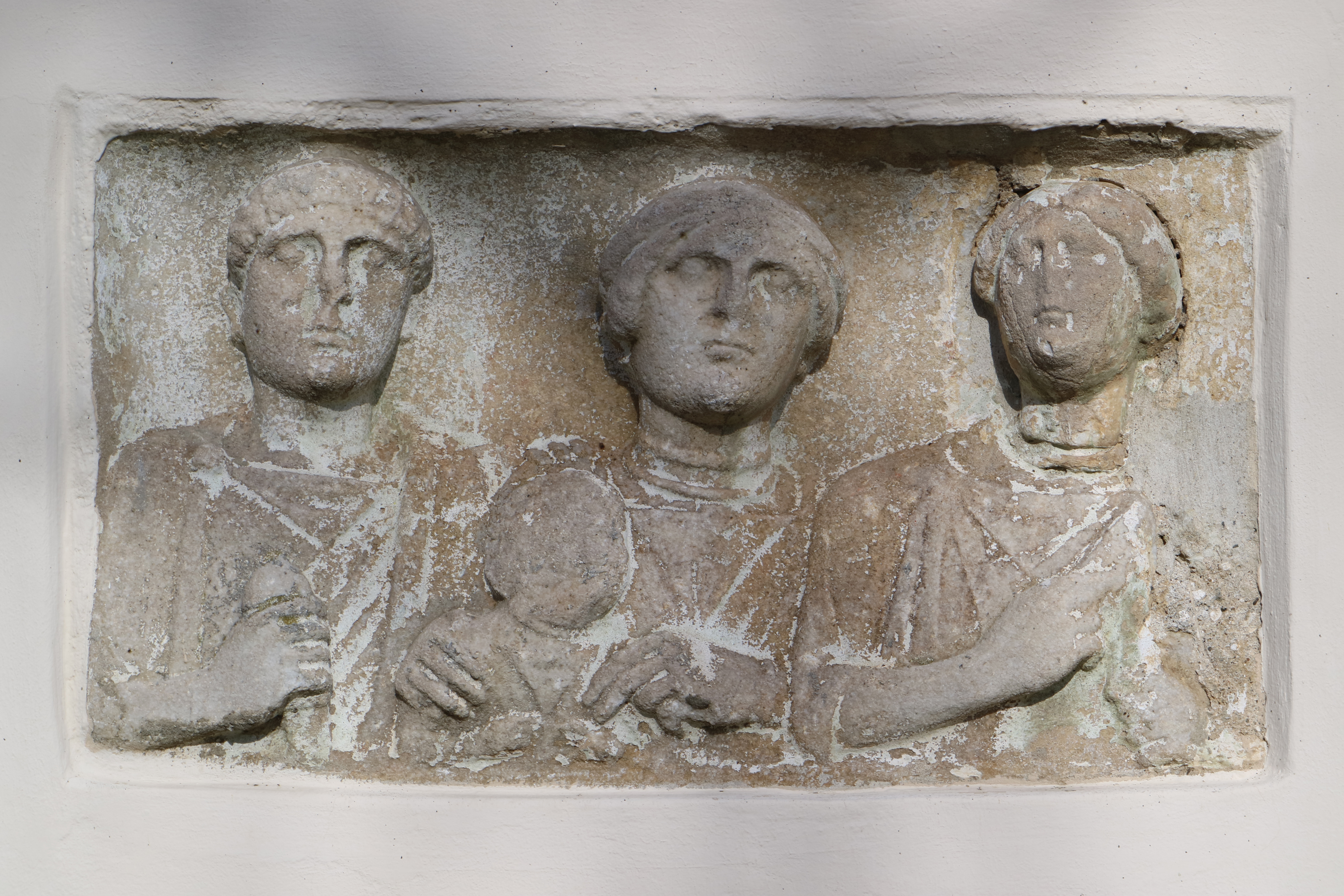
Roman portrait stone on the church wall of Maria im Dorn

There are more than 120 Roman burial mounds on the edge of the Kaiserwald Terrace, first described in detail by Marianne Grubinger in 1935. Most of the mounds date from the 1st and 2nd centuries AD and are arranged in several groups. The modest grave goods suggest that the population was rural. Under the direction of Grubinger, the Landesmuseum Joanneum found objects such as tripod bowls, clay jugs and glass beakers, as well as a few bronze coins, mainly depicting the Emperor Hadrian. According to prehistoric custom, the hand-made clay contained a lot of mica and quartz sand, and the decorations with rows of notches are stylistically dated to the La Tène period. A local peculiarity of the finds is the absence of folded cups, lamps and Roman bronze objects.

Grubinger recognized the Hallstatt burial form common in the Roman provinces, in which a corpse was cremated directly at the grave site and the cremated remains filled into vessels. Everything was then placed in the pyre, which was surrounded by round or rectangular stone walls. In the Kaiserwald the building material had to be brought from far away, e.g. Leitha limestone from the Wildoner Berg. Chemical analysis of one of the graves revealed a nitrogen-rich, fat-free organic mixture, probably a plant resin. An earlier find, which was kept in the Gjaidhof for a long time, is the Roman tomb relief, which is now attached to the church wall of Maria im Dorn in Dobl. Grubinger sees it as a portrait stone showing a Roman soldier with his wife and child and a second woman, possibly his mother. This work is said to have been part of a larger funerary monument of wealthy people to commemorate the death of the child.

Grubinger associates the abandonment of the settlements and the end of the use of the cemetery with the Marcomannic Wars of Emperor Marcus Aurelius, which also led to an economic decline in the regional capital of Flavia Solva.

Further finds were made by Siegfried Stadlhofer, who made several small finds with a metal detector between 1986 and 1993. The fibula found were published in the 1996 reports of the Federal Monuments Office, and there had already been complaints about recent grave-robbing in the Kaiserwald area. Grubinger had already noted dozens of earlier openings of burial mounds by farmers or "treasure hunters", which were manifested by depressions at the top of the mound.

The largest cemeteries are located in the cadastral districts of Fading and Dietersdorf. A cemetery with 16 burial mounds located by Grubinger in the Zwaring area has not yet been located. The burial mounds in the Schröttengraben in Fading were last thoroughly investigated a few years ago. A burial in the form of a stone sarcophagus had already been discovered in this area in 1974. Between 2008 and 2010, several emergency excavations were carried out by the Federal Office for the Protection of Monuments and the non-profit organization Archäologieland Steiermark due to the planned construction of a pond. At the bottom of the trench, not only Roman but also Bronze Age settlement remains from the 14th and 13th centuries BC were discovered. Investigation of the mounds brought discoveries: a grave filled with Roman bricks for unknown reasons, and an atypical flat grave whose carelessly deposited cremated remains indicate a pauper's grave. Most important, however, were the ceramic finds, which can be dated back to the Lasinja culture of the Copper Age. Whether the pre-Roman finds, more than 6000 years old, indicate settlements or tombs has not yet been determined. All burial mounds in the Kaiserwald have been listed since 1999.

A marble portrait head from the Roman period is also believed to have been found in the Kaiserwald. However, the Landesmuseum Joanneum suspects that this work of art was stolen from Apollonia by members of the German armed forces during World War II and then deposited in the Styrian forest. As of 2015, restitution to Libya was still pending.

=== Etymology ===
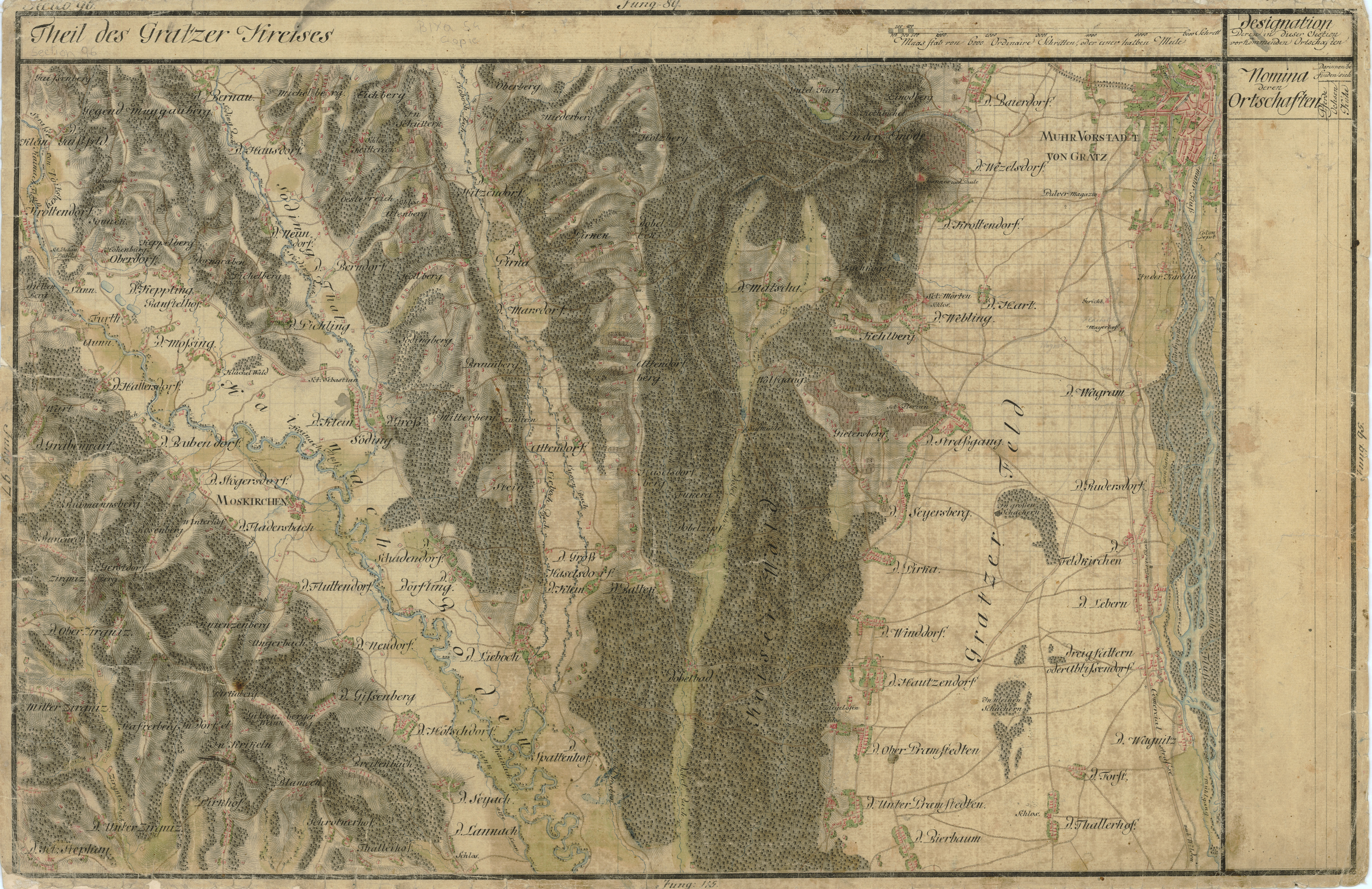

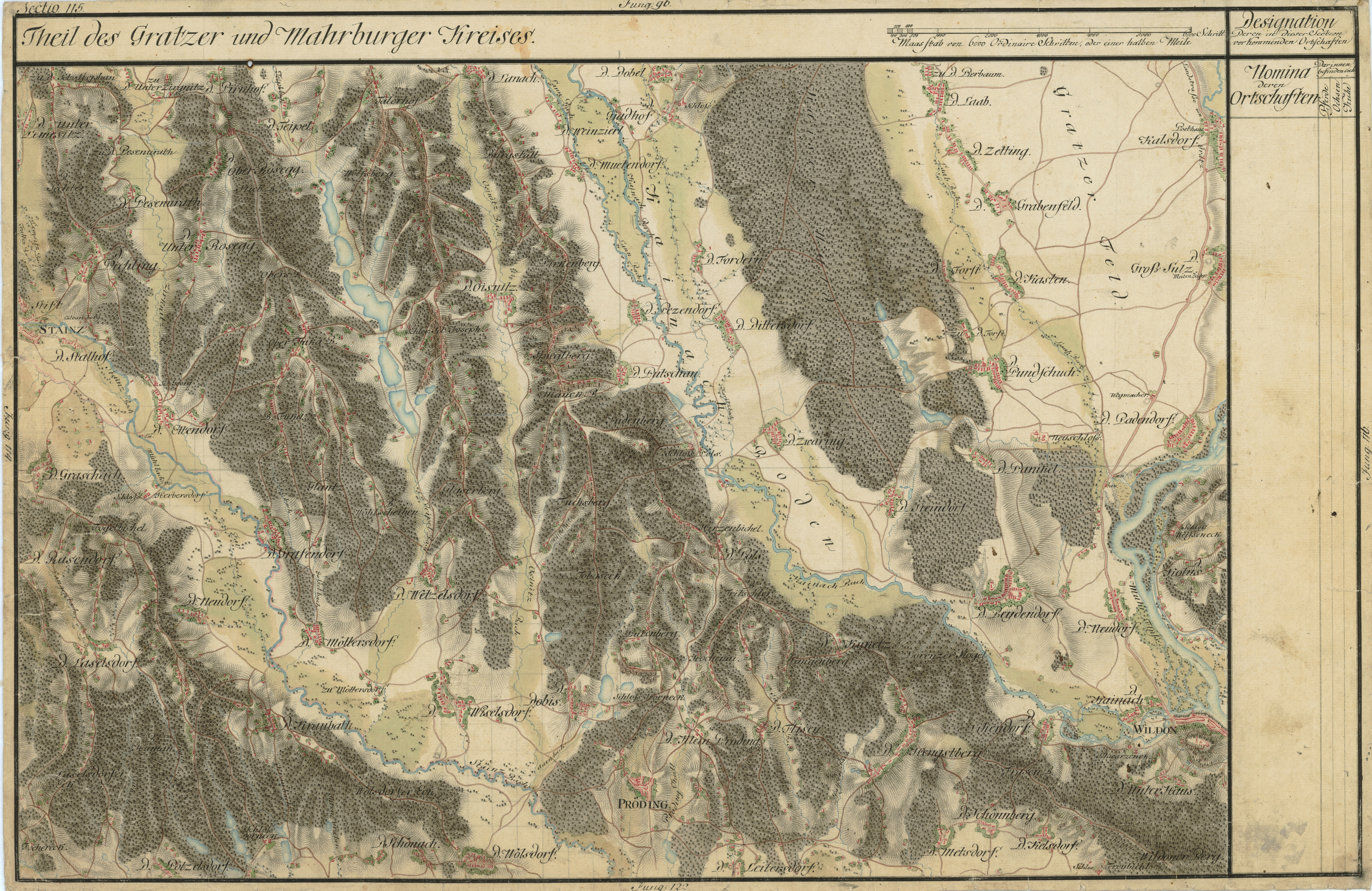

It was not until the Josephinian Land Survey of 1787 that much of the forest was given its current name. Prior to this, the forest area, with a few exceptions, was known as the Imperial Khart. The earlier meaning of the word "Hart" or "Khart" was no longer known in the 18th century, as can be seen from the inappropriate use of the term in the former municipality of Oberpremstätten. Originally, the term was used to describe a loose stand of trees, which in some places became dense, and is therefore rather a term for loosely connected forests. The status of the owner was first reflected in the name of the forest under Ernest the Iron, when it was called "des Herzogen Wald". After the Styrian rulers became emperors in 1471, the forest was called "Roman Emperor's Wood". Until the 18th and 19th centuries, the official name was Forst zu Tobel or, derived from it, Dobler Forst. The Old High German word "Dobl" means something like forest ravine or forest cut.

=== History of ownership and utilization ===
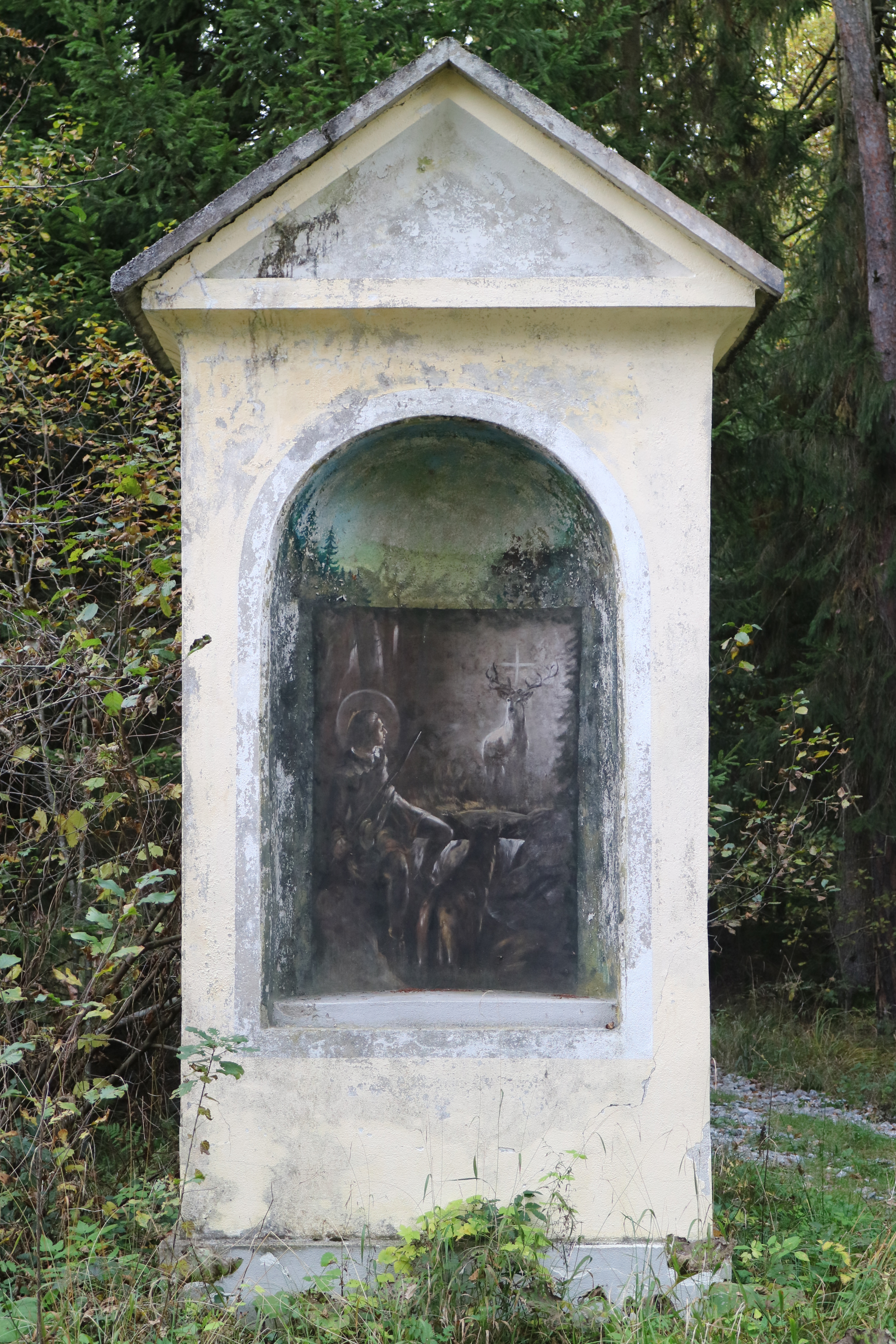
Hunters' cross near Tobelbad

After the Germanic-Franconian kings came to power in Slavic Carantania, the Imperial Forest became the property of the nobility in 788. The forest right was a royal right and could be granted to nobles, who also received the right to clear and colonize the land. Probably by means of an official fiefdom, this right passed from the Aribonian family to the Otakars and Traungauers in the High Middle Ages, who were the margraves and dukes of Styria at that time. Over the centuries, numerous donations resulted in complex legal relationships, and the western and southwestern edges of the forest were separated from the old forest at an early stage, for example by clearing farmland in the Carolingian village of Fading. Since the 13th century, the history of the forest has been closely linked to Gjaidhof Castle. The estate was an imperial hunting seat and later also housed the princely forestry office. The era of princely hunting began with the last Babenberg, Frederick the Quarrelsome, and ended with Charles VI. Watching a herd of deer from the castle one evening, he is said to have exclaimed: "This is an imperial pleasure! For a long time, the imperial forest also supplied timber for the construction and scaffolding of princely buildings in Graz, such as the extension of the cistern on the Schlossberg in 1579.

Because of its role as a protected forest, local farmers had no or limited rights of use, such as grazing rights. These grazing rights divided the forest into sections, last recorded in 1773 and 1812. In addition, the inhabitants of the settlements on the edge of the forest had to face many challenges; a plague of wolves and wild boars is recorded in 1636. Parts of the forest, crisscrossed by mill and church roads, were ceded to neighboring Lords, such as the Counts of Montfort. The sovereign had the right to prohibit game in the entire Imperial Forest, including the lands of the noble lords. Violations of both hunting and forestry laws were often punished with a torture chamber or imprisonment in the Graz casemates.

After the Gjaidhof had been privately owned since 1780, it was decided to sell the Imperial Forest for economic reasons. Efforts to sell the forest had already been made under Ferdinand II and Maria Theresa. However, it was only after the abolition of serfdom by Joseph II that the Dobl Forest, with a total area of 2045 yoke, was put up for auction on May 5, 1825. A table of confessions, adapted from the French land register, summarized the areas to be sold. With the highest bid of 81,060 florins, three authorized representatives of the united peasantry acquired the properties, which were eventually divided among 517 buyers from 29 surrounding communities.

It was not until 1866 that the final land register order was established and the hunting rights were acquired by Schloss Neuschloß.

==== Confession table ====
- Name of the sale: Place names of the properties (1825); only areas in the Dobler Forest are listed.
- Parcel(s): Parcel numbers in the Franzis sign Land Register (1820/1823); the center of the parcel is indicated.
- Cadastral parish: Cadastral parish according to the territorial status at the time.
- Area: Area in Yoke (J.) and square kilometer (qkl.) as well as converted into hectare (ha); 1 Austrian Yoke corresponds to 1600 square kilometer and 0.575464 hectare.

Table extract
Sales designation	Property(ies)	Cadastral municipality	Surface area		Remark
Field in the Birka forest in Dobler Forst	46.9607°N 15.4001°E	Unterpremstätten	1 J. 191 qkl.	0,64 ha	
Meadow in the Birka forest in Dobler Forst	46.9579°N 15.3997°E, 46.9607°N 15.4001°E	Unterpremstätten	2 J. 542 qkl.	1,35 ha	
Meadows in the Haywood forest in Dobler Forst	46.9508°N 15.3810°E, 46.9539°N 15.3786°E, 46.9546°N 15.3863°E	Unterpremstätten	5 J. 229 qkl.	2,96 ha	
Upper Khart with softwood	46.9499°N 15.4086°E	Unterpremstätten	43 J. 1579 qkl.	25,31 ha	with hardwood
Upper Khart with softwood	46.9536°N 15.4039°E	Unterpremstätten	16 J. 804 qkl.	9,5 ha	mixed wood
Upper Khart with softwood	46.9551°N 15.4082°E	Unterpremstätten	10 J. 64 qkl.	5,78 ha	Rangeland
Upper Khart with softwood	46.9575°N 15.4039°E, 46.9524°N 15.4102°E	Unterpremstätten	50 J. 1094 qkl.	29,17 ha	
Farchriegl forest with coniferous wood	46.9472°N 15.4152°E, 46.9407°N 15.4180°E, 46.9417°N 15.4093°E	Unterpremstätten	115 J. 934 qkl.	66,51 ha	with hardwood
Farchriegl forest with coniferous wood		Unterpremstätten	5 J. 137 qkl.	2,93 ha	mixed wood
Farchriegl forest with coniferous wood	46.9453°N 15.4135°E	Unterpremstätten	25 J. 1069 qkl.	14,77 ha	Rangeland
Farchriegl forest with coniferous wood	46.9419°N 15.4153°E, 46.9383°N 15.4192°E	Unterpremstätten	25 J. 719 qkl.	14,65 ha	
Lower Khart under the Ponigl bridge between the Lembach and Farchriegl forest area to the Schwabenkreuz	46.9412°N 15.4067°E, 46.9390°N 15.4060°E	Unterpremstätten	30 J. 121 qkl.	17,31 ha	Rangeland
Mühlleiten and Birka forest with coniferous wood	46.9389°N 15.3958°E, 46.9437°N 15.3960°E, 46.9545°N 15.3972°E, 46.9522°N 15.3913°E	Unterpremstätten	418 J. 1343 qkl.	241,03 ha	with hardwood
Mühlleiten and Birka forest with coniferous wood	46.9580°N 15.4006°E	Unterpremstätten	2 J. 1354 qkl.	1,64 ha	Rangeland
Mühlleiten and Birka forest with coniferous wood	46.9387°N 15.3912°E, 46.9389°N 15.3910°E, 46.9412°N 15.3870°E, 46.9540°N 15.4014°E, 46.9617°N 15.3989°E, 46.9497°N 15.3966°E	Unterpremstätten	66 J. 596 qkl.	38,19 ha	
Ameisriegl forest with coniferous wood	46.9604°N 15.3913°E	Unterpremstätten	66 J. 437 qkl.	38,14 ha	with hardwood
Ameisriegl forest with coniferous wood	46.9604°N 15.3913°E	Unterpremstätten	6 J. 433 qkl.	3,61 ha	mixed wood
Ameisriegl forest with coniferous wood	46.9604°N 15.3913°E	Unterpremstätten	2 J. 863 qkl.	1,46 ha	Rangeland
Ameisriegl forest with coniferous wood	46.9604°N 15.3913°E	Unterpremstätten	1344 qkl.	0,48 ha	
Haywood forest with coniferous wood	46.9626°N 15.3805°E, 46.9693°N 15.3723°E, 46.9678°N 15.3725°E	Unterpremstätten	284 J. 1013 qkl.	163,8 ha	with hardwood
Haywood forest with coniferous wood	46.9626°N 15.3805°E, 46.9577°N 15.3752°E	Unterpremstätten	8 J. 1391 qkl.	5,1 ha	Rangeland
Haywood forest with coniferous wood	46.9513°N 15.3842°E, 46.9521°N 15.3788°E, 46.9536°N 15.3788°E, 46.9563°N 15.3764°E, 46.9531°N 15.3868°E, 46.9654°N 15.3787°E, 46.9605°N 15.3744°E, 46.9546°N 15.3781°E	Unterpremstätten	25 J. 1288 qkl.	14,85 ha	
Dietersdorfer forest or Birkgraben and pond forest between Zettlinger and Kastner Mühlweg, with conifers.	46.9324°N 15.4037°E, 46.9315°N 15.4136°E	Dietersdorf	308 J. 1073 qkl.	177,63 ha	Rangeland
Dietersdorfer forest or Birkgraben and pond forest between Zettlinger and Kastner Mühlweg, with conifers.	46.9379°N 15.4165°E, 46.9292°N 15.4014°E	Dietersdorf	13 J. 1040 qkl.	7,86 ha	
Steindorfer Khart between the Wundschuher Kirchweg and the Steindorf community, with conifers	46.9134°N 15.4299°E	Zwaring	157 J. 338 qkl.	90,47 ha	with hardwood
Steindorfer Khart between the Wundschuher Kirchweg and the Steindorf community, with conifers	46.9134°N 15.4299°E	Zwaring	17 J. 1386 qkl.	10,28 ha	Rangeland
Steindorfer Khart between the Wundschuher Kirchweg and the Steindorf community, with conifers	46.9141°N 15.4309°E, 46.9154°N 15.4396°E, 46.9204°N 15.4357°E	Zwaring	16 J. 1563 qkl.	9,77 ha	
Birkkogl or Birkgraben and Khart on the sides of the Wundschuher pond between the Wundschuher Kirchweg and the Kastner Mühlweg, with coniferous forest.	46.9207°N 15.4328°E, 46.9226°N 15.4219°E	Zwaring	229 J. 893 qkl.	132,1 ha	with hardwood
Birkkogl or Birkgraben and Khart on the sides of the Wundschuher pond between the Wundschuher Kirchweg and the Kastner Mühlweg, with coniferous forest.	46.9192°N 15.4297°E, 46.9226°N 15.4219°E	Zwaring	27 J. 1292 qkl.	16 ha	Rangeland
Birkkogl or Birkgraben and Khart on the sides of the Wundschuher pond between the Wundschuher Kirchweg and the Kastner Mühlweg, with coniferous forest.	46.9176°N 15.4319°E, 46.9251°N 15.4162°E, 46.9223°N 15.4236°E, 46.9228°N 15.4134°E, 46.9173°N 15.4210°E	Zwaring	13 J. 769 qkl.	7,76 ha	

Second World WarIn the course of the building measures for the creation of "Greater Graz", construction activities also began in Kaiserwald in 1939. In 1941/1942, as part of the wartime expansion towards south-eastern Europe, an ammunition factory (Muna) was built near the present-day settlement of Kaiserwald, which was made accessible by an additional five-kilometer rail line from the Premstätten-Tobelbad station. The tracks of the standard-gauge Muna connecting line, which was dismantled immediately after the war, were subject to strict secrecy and were not included in the GKB plans. Railway historian Sepp Tezak was unable to gain much insight, even in conversations with contemporary witnesses. The brick industry in Unterpremstätten was pushed ahead with housing construction. On May 15, 1942, the construction work in Kaiserwald was stopped with the official reason that it was "not important for the war effort". The forced laborers employed there were transferred to Germany. 20 people died during construction and were buried at the site. According to a field command activity report, construction was to be resumed in October 1944. The responsible Upper Command gave the order to prepare the site of the planned ammunition depot for a larger ammunition depot using the buildings already completed in the shell. For this purpose, 200 Finn tents for ammunition storage and 1200 meters of field railroad track were to be provided. According to the report, difficulties in the construction of the siding included a lack of rail material, the supply of ballast for the substructure, and a shortage of labor. On October 16, 1944, the Allies conducted a targeted air raid on the Kaiserwald ammunition dumps. A squadron of about 30 aircraft coming from the west dropped about 240 bombs of 250 and 500 kilograms at 12 noon, destroying three hectares of forest and several buildings in the neighboring village of Zwaring. Rudolf Kainz, Grete Kainz, Cäcilia Kainz, Johanna Alter, Theresia Schreiner and Maria Denegger were killed, seven people were injured and nine were made homeless.

Since 1938, there had also been a Reich Labor Service (RAD) camp in the Kaiserwald. For the establishment of the Steindorf camp (RAD Department 6/360), the responsible authority leased private farmland, which was returned to its rightful owner after the end of the war. Among other things, the workers were occupied with the regulation of the Kainach River, which in the meantime was reflected in the population figures of the community of Zwaring-Pöls, which reached a temporary peak in 1939. In January 1942, 160 people had to leave the camp, which led to the cessation of operations. The buildings were torn down in 1945.

From the fall of 1946, the mine clearance service in the Kaiserwald was involved in the destruction of war material. In 1949, the Steirerblatt newspaper reported on the controlled detonation of bombs and other explosives from the Kalsdorf ammunition depot near Graz. According to regulations, the ammunition was transported by truck to a clearing in the forest and detonated from a bunker 300 meters away. The inhabitants of the surrounding villages were warned by a siren. The continuous detonations resulted in a distinctly young forest vegetation without undergrowth. Glowing explosives or incendiary devices caused the grass to burn quickly and take on a dry, yellowish form, so that the clearing, in combination with the large blast craters, resembled a "moonscape". Because of the high risk of fire, the work could only be done in winter. In the summer, clearing crews were on the move, land mines and other recovered explosives. By February 1949, 140 tons of war material had been defused in the Kaiserwald.

Some of the remnants of the German army buildings can still be seen today. In addition to an unfinished looking reinforced concrete hall, called a "temple" by local residents, there are the foundations of several barracks, as well as some stone water tunnels and a large shooting range with three bullet traps. Since there are few records of Nazi activities in the Kaiserwald, the finds and ruins leave room for speculation, especially regarding the exact course of the connecting railroad. Information on the location and extent of the objects can be found in the online ALS data of the state.

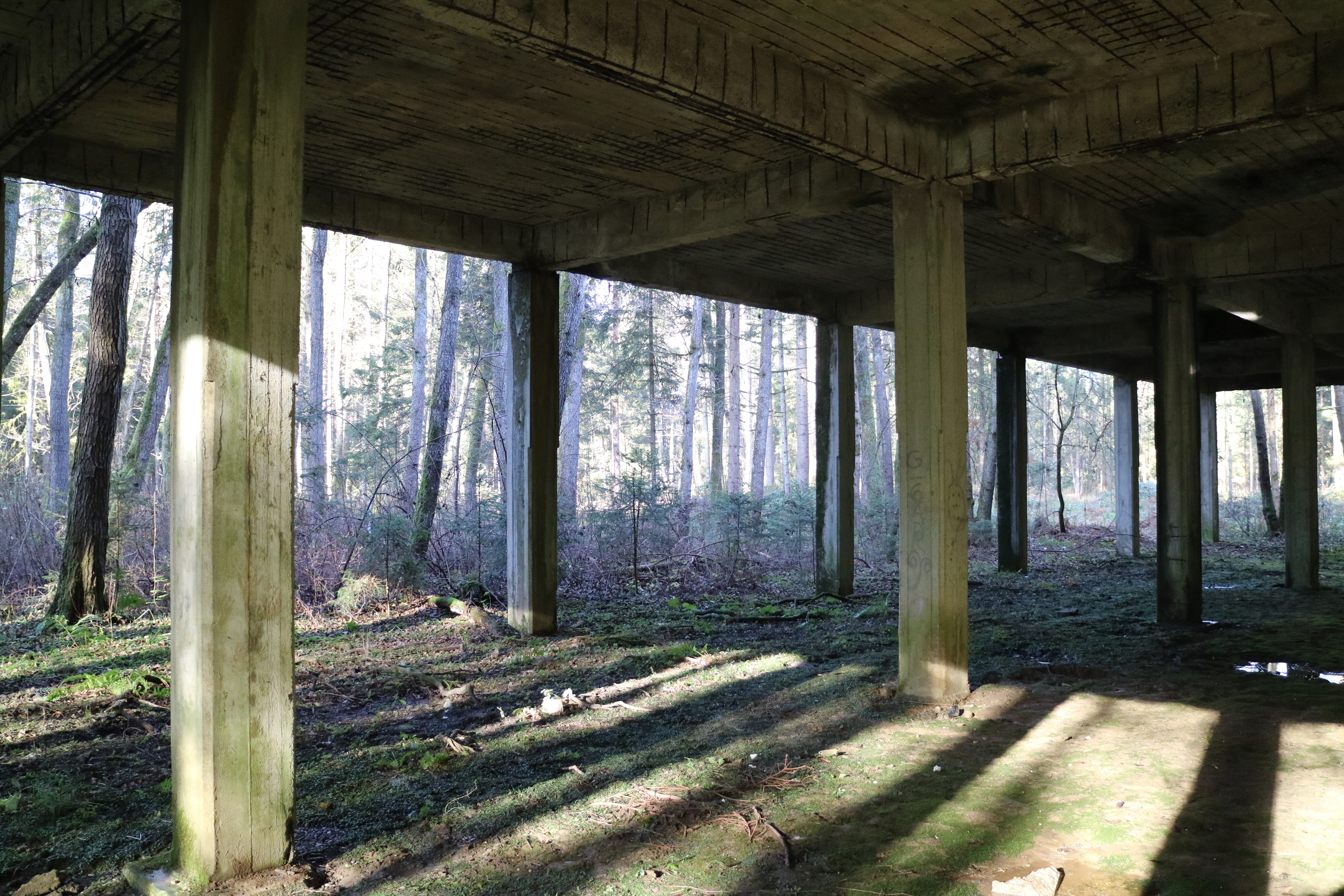
Hall

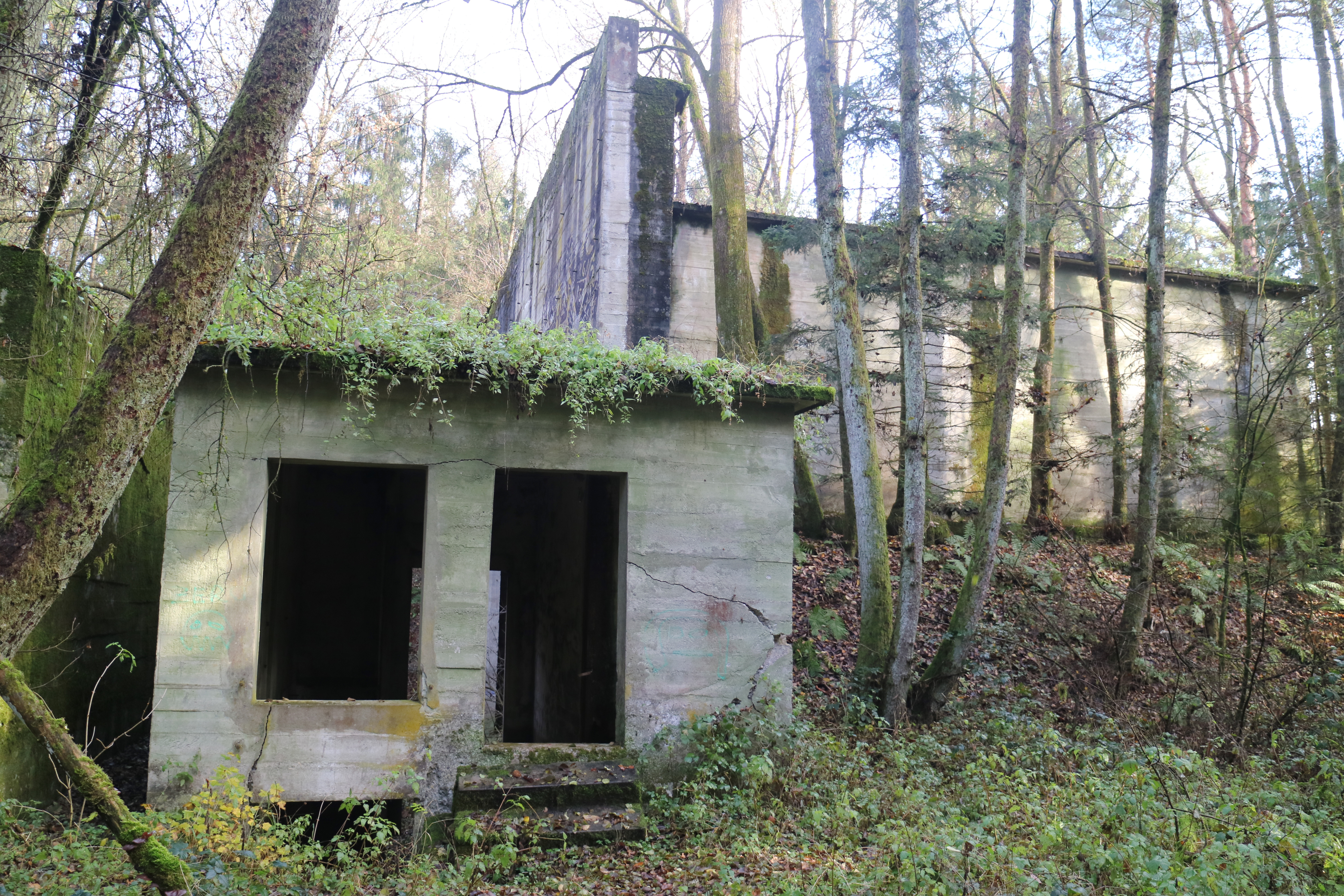
Shooting range

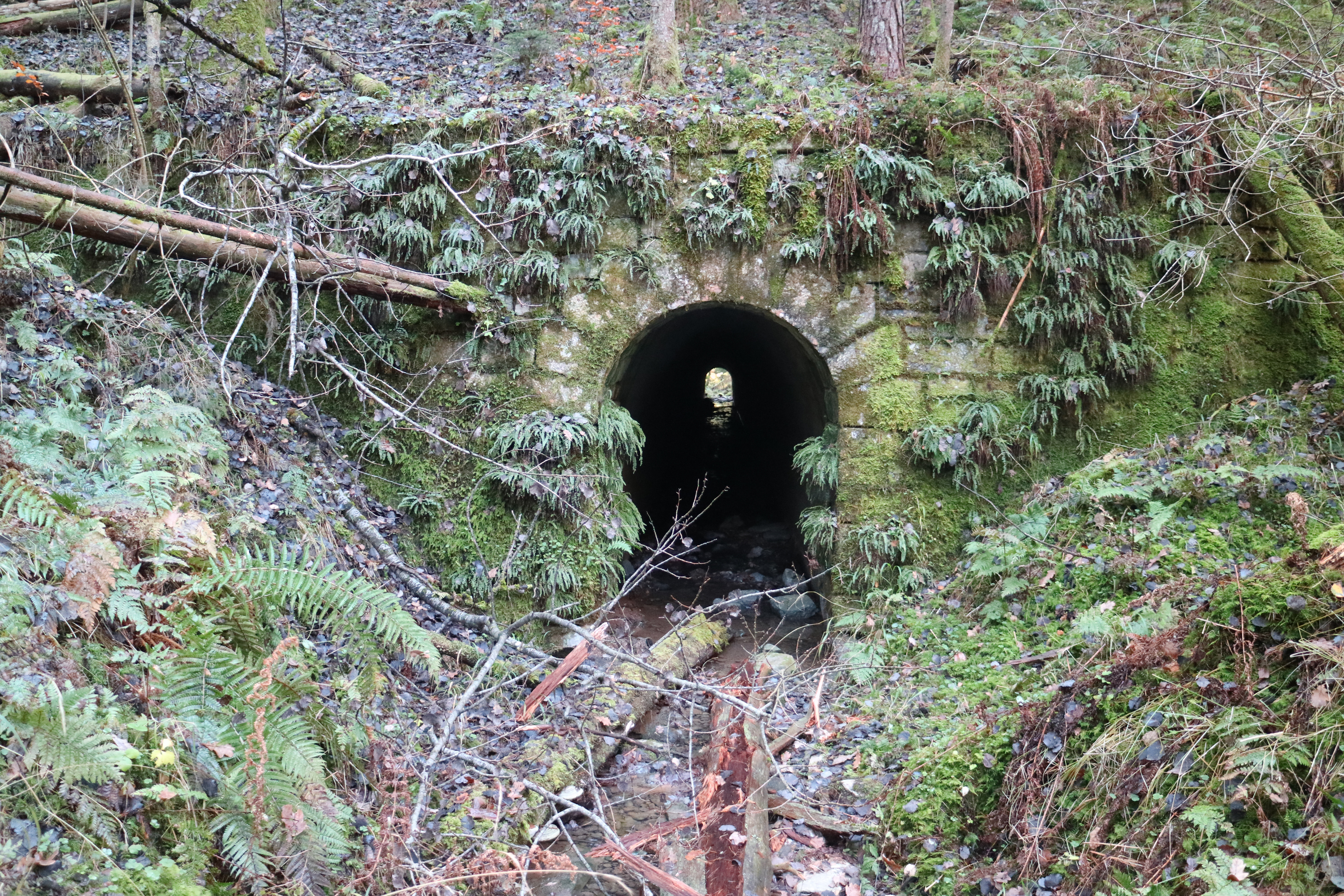
Water tunnel

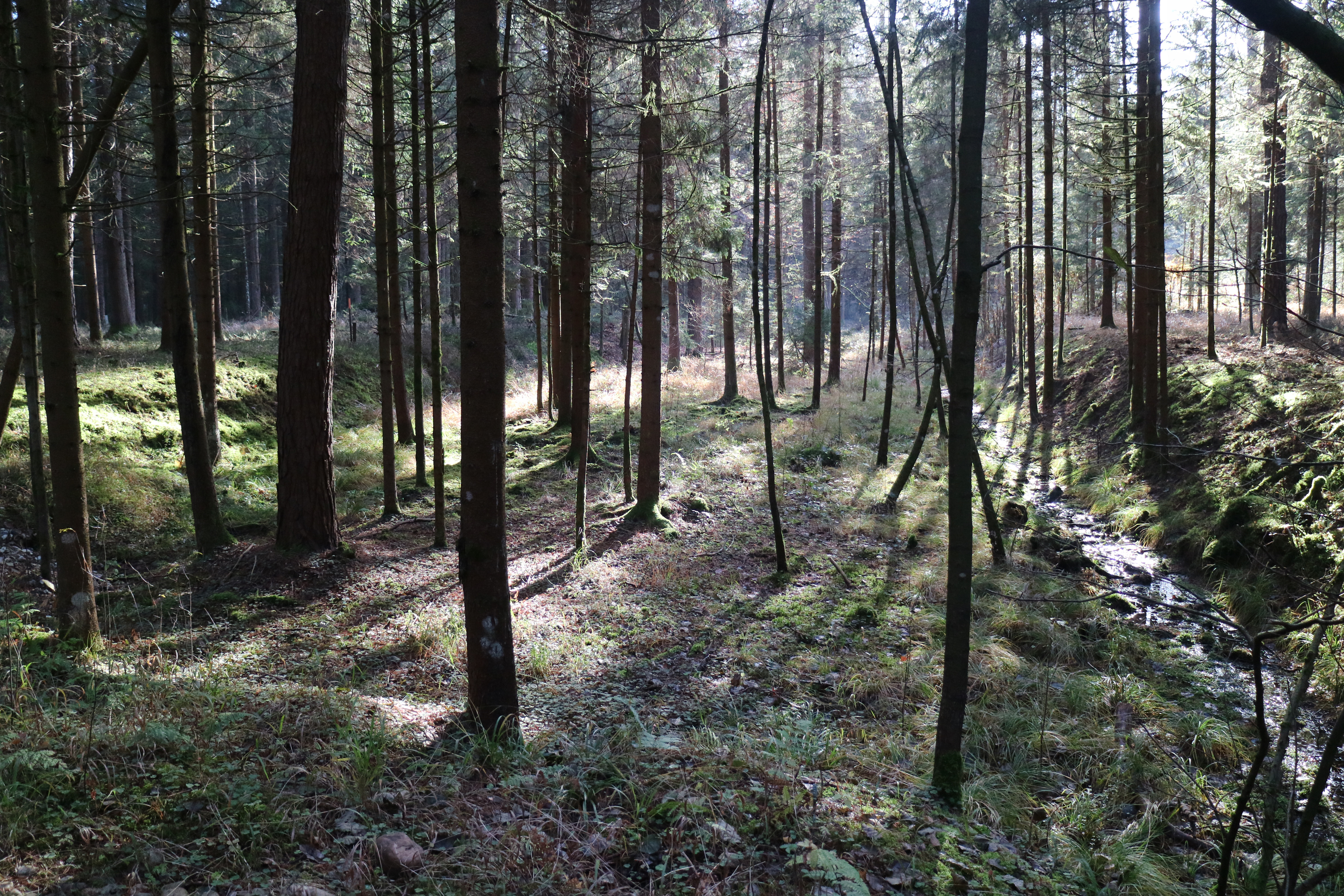
Railroad line

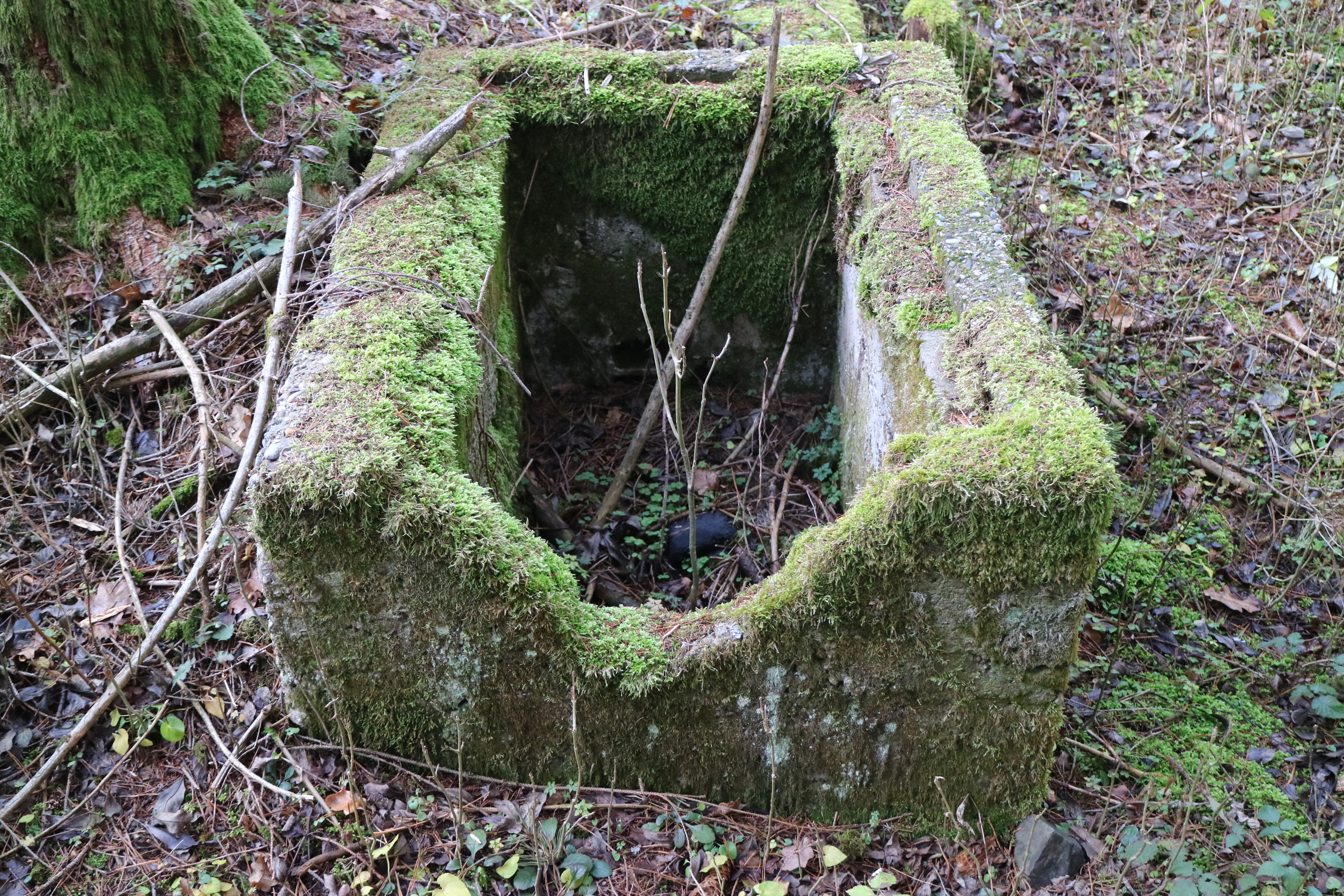
RAD camp in Steindorf

=== Recent history ===
After the Second World War, the forest was increasingly used for recreational purposes. As early as 1947, there were concrete plans to establish a Styrian film production in the Kaiserwald. To this end, Austria Alpenland Avantgarde-Film Ltd. ("Alpenfilm") planned to connect seven houses on a twelve-yoke site - today's Kaiserwaldsiedlung - and convert them into sound studios and offices. In addition, a hotel for actors was to be built and an existing pond was to be converted into a bathing facility. The Steirerblatt newspaper called the project a "valuable contribution to the reconstruction of the country. In contrast to the already world-famous Viennese film industry, "Austrian" films were to be produced. Even details of the first planned film were announced. "Our star is sinking" was to be a warning against the rise of atomic energy and was to star one of Austria's greatest film actors. The project ultimately proved unfeasible for cost reasons, and film production was moved to Thalerhof Airport, where several feature films were made until 1954. At the end of October 2020, the Graz Theater filmed war scenes for the apocalyptic film Krasnoyarsk in the dilapidated ammunition depot. The dramaturge called the "concrete cathedral in the woods" a "magical place.

Less concrete were future plans to develop the Kaiserwald into a modern recreational area for the people of Graz. A highway was to make it possible to reach the forest from the city in just a few minutes. The excavated material from an artificial bathing lake was to be used for road construction. These and similar ideas were discussed in the Forum Stadtpark in February 1966 after a discussion on the development goals of the city of Graz, and have been implemented, at least in part, to this day.

On March 16, 1961, one of the largest forest fires in Styria occurred in the Kaiserwald. Triggered by flying sparks from a GKB locomotive, five hectares of young forest burned to the ground. The firefighters from the five surrounding communities needed reinforcements from the Graz fire department to bring the one-kilometer-long fire under control. In November 2008, three people were killed when a Piper PA-34 crashed in the Kaiserwald forest between Zwaring and Wundschuh.

In February 2020, it became known that Strabag was having an environmental impact assessment carried out for a planned landfill in the local recreation area of Premstätten. Both the citizens' initiative Pro Premstätten and Mayor Anton Scherbinek announced their protest.

== Utilization ==
=== Settlements ===
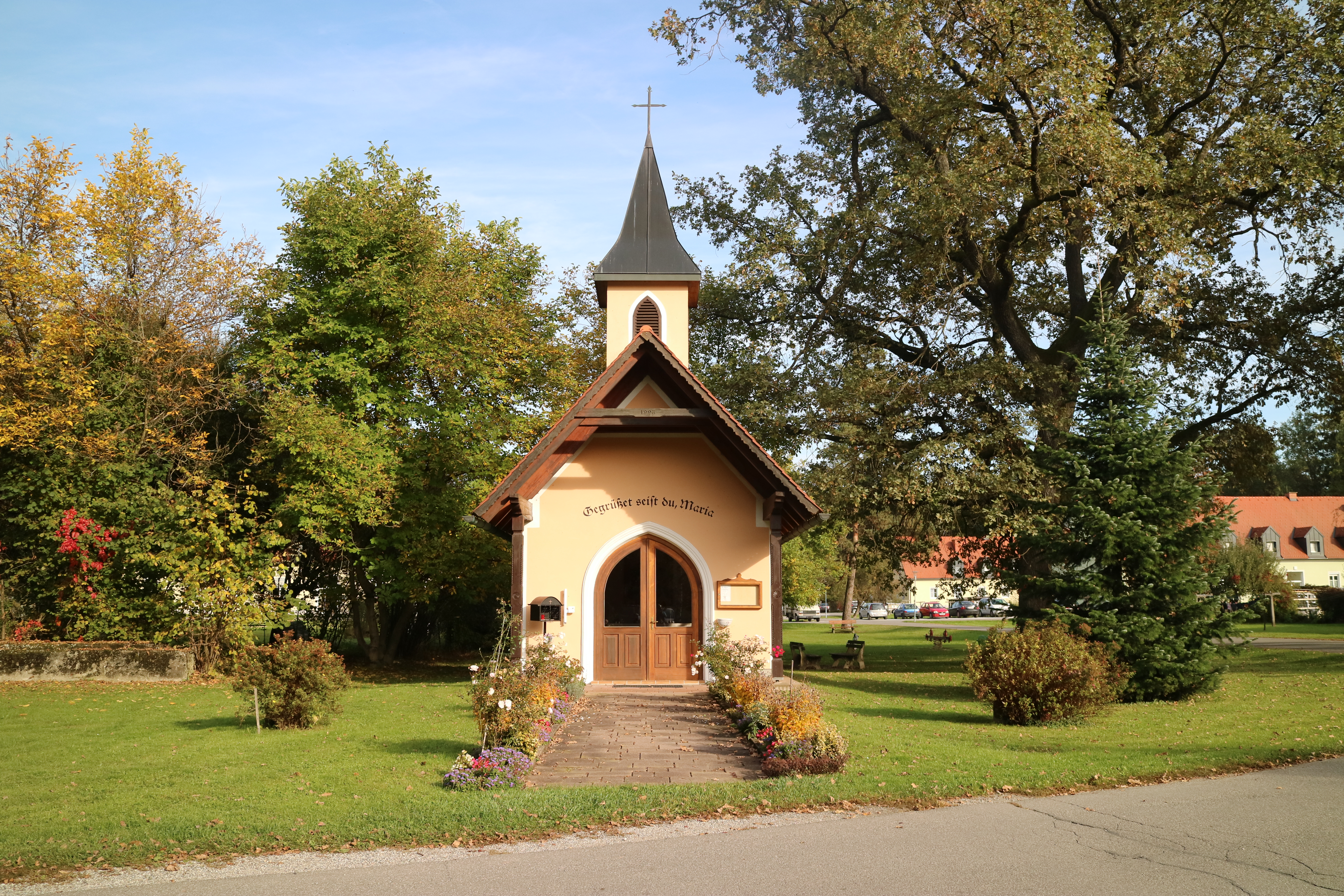
Chapel in the Kaiserwald settlement

The Kaiserwald terrace has remained largely untouched by settlement activity to this day. The reason for this is not only its former function as a princely hunting fores but also the clayey nature of the soil, which restricts agricultural use in many places. In addition, none of the streams have sufficient water flow for mill operations. There are only a few isolated contiguous districts, such as in the Unterpremstätten area or the Kaiserwald settlement, a former airmen's settlement near Zettling. Another more recent settlement that had to make way for forest is the Rehweg settlement on the Packer Bundesstraße, which also belongs to the municipality of Premstätten. Due to its importance as a green zone and its ecological role in the regional settlement model, the local development concepts of the municipalities (OEK) and the regional development program (REPRO) for the Styrian central region do not provide for any further building activities in the Kaiserwald area.

=== Traffic ===
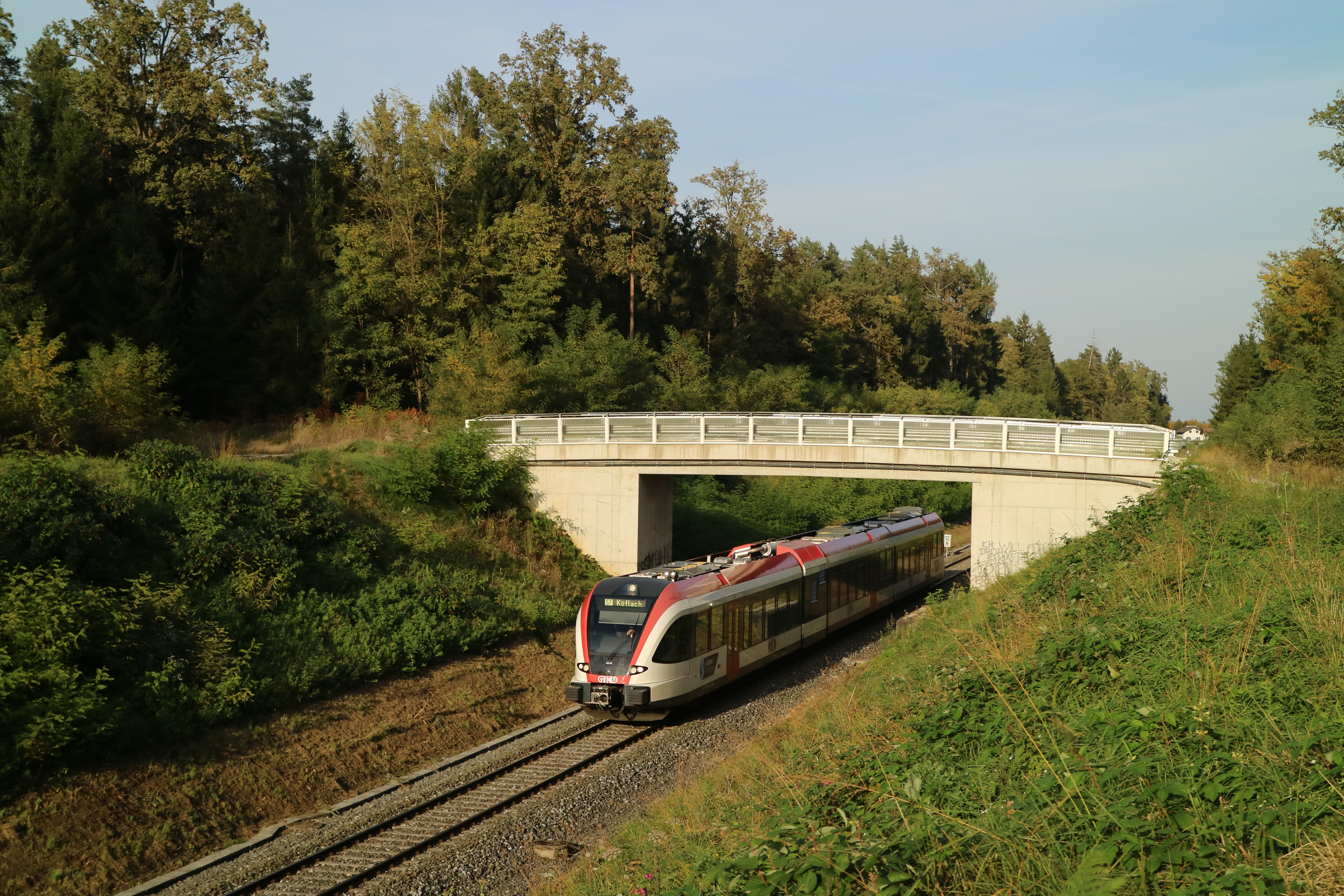
GKB train in Kaiserwald

The Graz-Köflach Railway (GKB), originally built to develop the lignite mining areas of western Styria, has traversed the Kaiserwald since its opening in 1859. The line first runs along the edge of the forest between Windorf (municipality of Seiersberg-Pirka) and Unterpremstätten and then crosses the forest in a straight line towards Lieboch. The only visible part of the line today is the siding of the German Armed Forces, which went deep into the forest and necessitated the extension of the station Premstätten-Tobelbad.

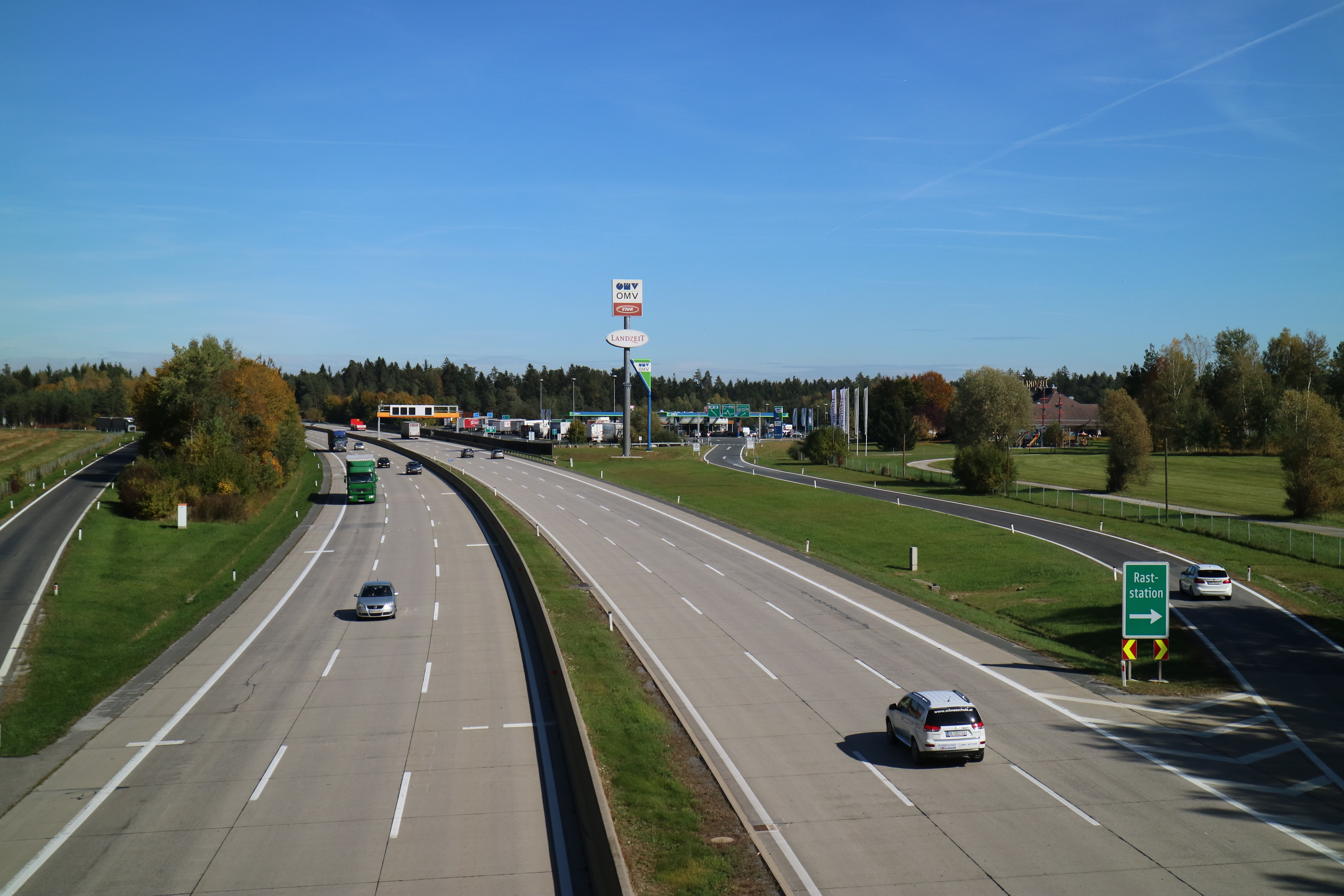
South Motorway (A 2) with service area at the western edge of the forest

One of the most important traffic routes in Austria runs through the Kaiserwald in the form of the A2 South Motorway, also known as European route E66 in this section. Construction of the 8.5-kilometer section between today's Graz-West junction and Lieboch began in 1969. This fifth section of the Styrian South Highway was dubbed the "Kaiserwald section" and required 2.6 million cubic meters of earth movements for the superstructure and substructure, as well as the construction of the temporary roadway. At the same time, the Lieboch junction was built, including access ramps for the Radlpass road. The cost of the contract was estimated at 125 million Austrian Schillings, which was more than half of the annual federal budget for highway construction in Styria. A new construction method was used, which was presented in January 1971 at an information conference in the construction center in Graz by the working group "subsoil" of the research society for road construction in the association of engineers and architects together with a working committee of the Austrian lime industry. The addition of quicklime made a significant contribution to the stabilization of the loamy Kaiserwald terrace and the Kainach soil. Lime sand and gravel had already been used for the same purpose on local and freight roads, but not on highways. The Graz-Kaiserwald service station and restaurant are located on a plateau above the Gepringbach stream.

In addition, five provincial roads cross the forest, from north to south: Packer Straße B 70, Premstättener Straße L 376, Muttendorfer Straße L 374, Predinger Straße L 303 and Wundschuhstraße L 380.

=== Local recreation ===
A large part of the Kaiserwald is classified in the provincial forest development plan (WEP) as a forest with a high social function. There are numerous municipal hiking trails throughout the forest, including the Dobler Rundwanderweg, the Kneipp trail at Zwaring, and the educational trail at the Wundschuh Pond. In the southern part, the Grazer Umland-Weg (GUW), a long-distance hiking trail, crosses the Kaiserwald terrace between Dietersdorf and Ponigl. The Archduke-Johann-Radweg (provincial cycle path R9) runs along the L 374 to Stainz, while an unsigned cycle path runs along the L 303 to the Kaiserwaldsiedlung. In addition, the unpaved Peter-Rosegger-Weg between Zettling and Kaiserwaldsiedlung is open to cyclists.

The Wundschuh pond, one of several artificially created standing bodies of water on the Poniglbach stream, was converted into a bathing lake with a campsite in 1973, which was primarily intended as a recreational center for the city population of Graz. For some years now, the water area, also known as Wundschuh Lake, has been used as a fishing pond, just like the Windorf pond and the Kling pond near Unterpremstätten. All three bodies of water are part of protected landscape areas.

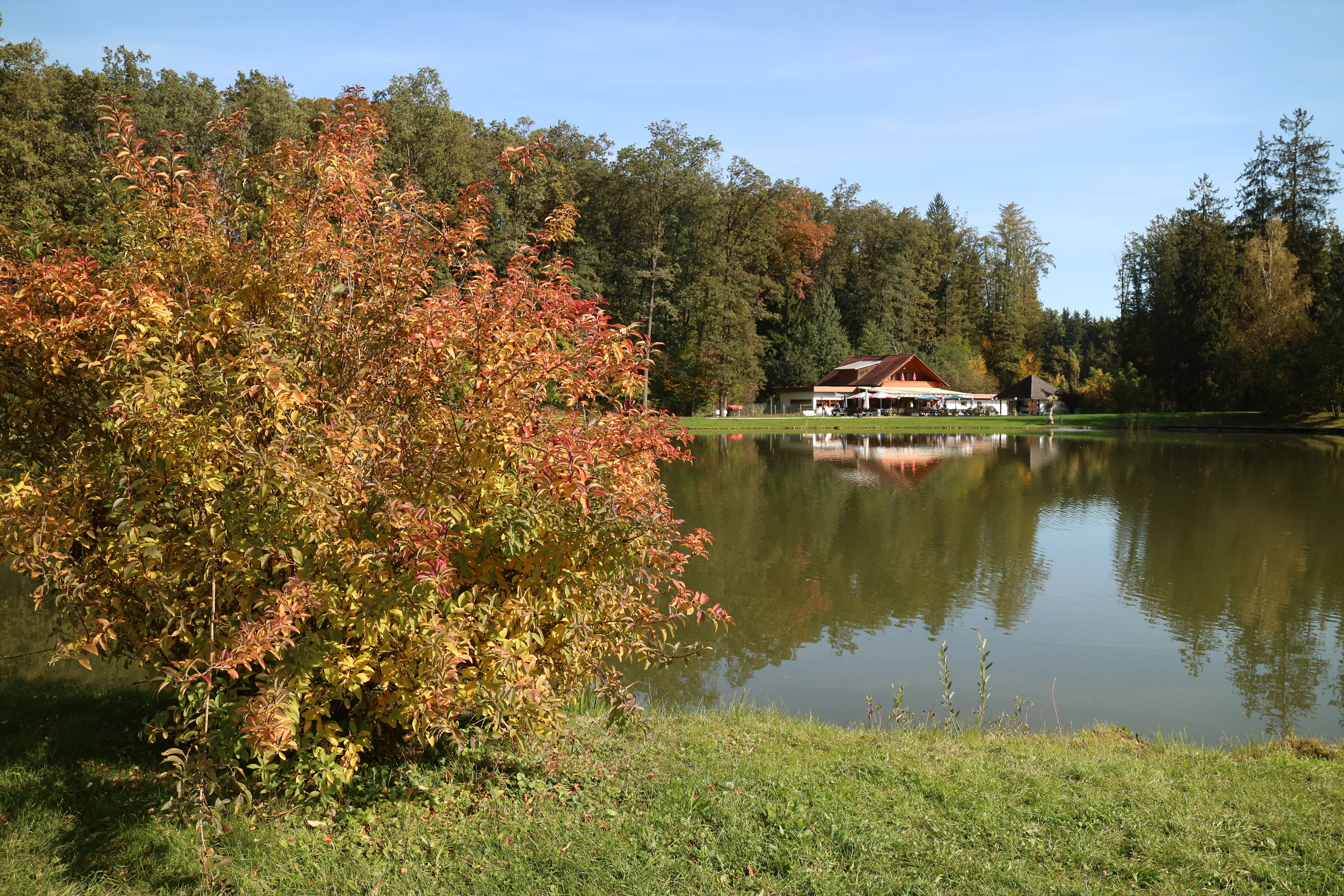
Wundschuh Teich

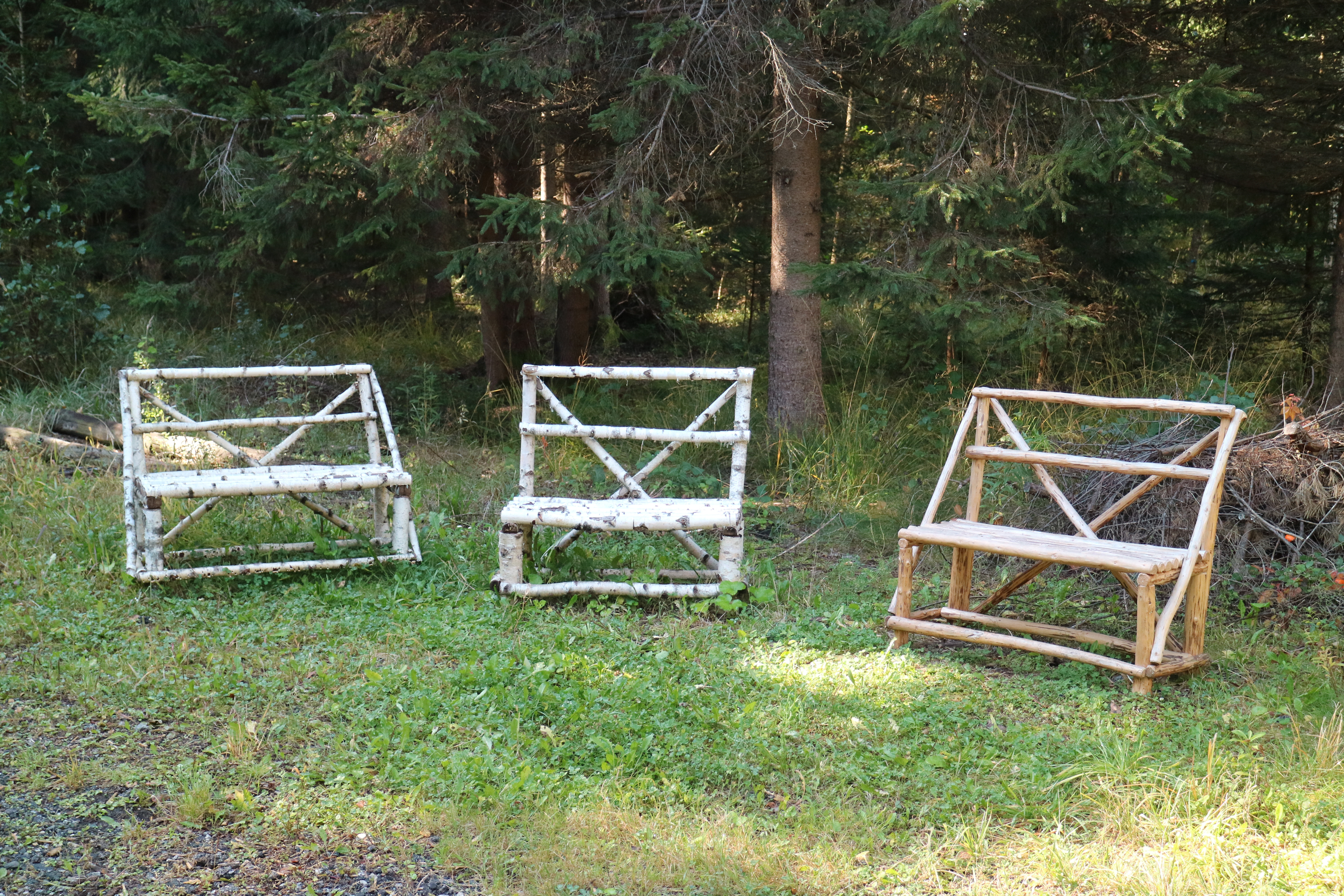
Benches made of birch or spruce wood

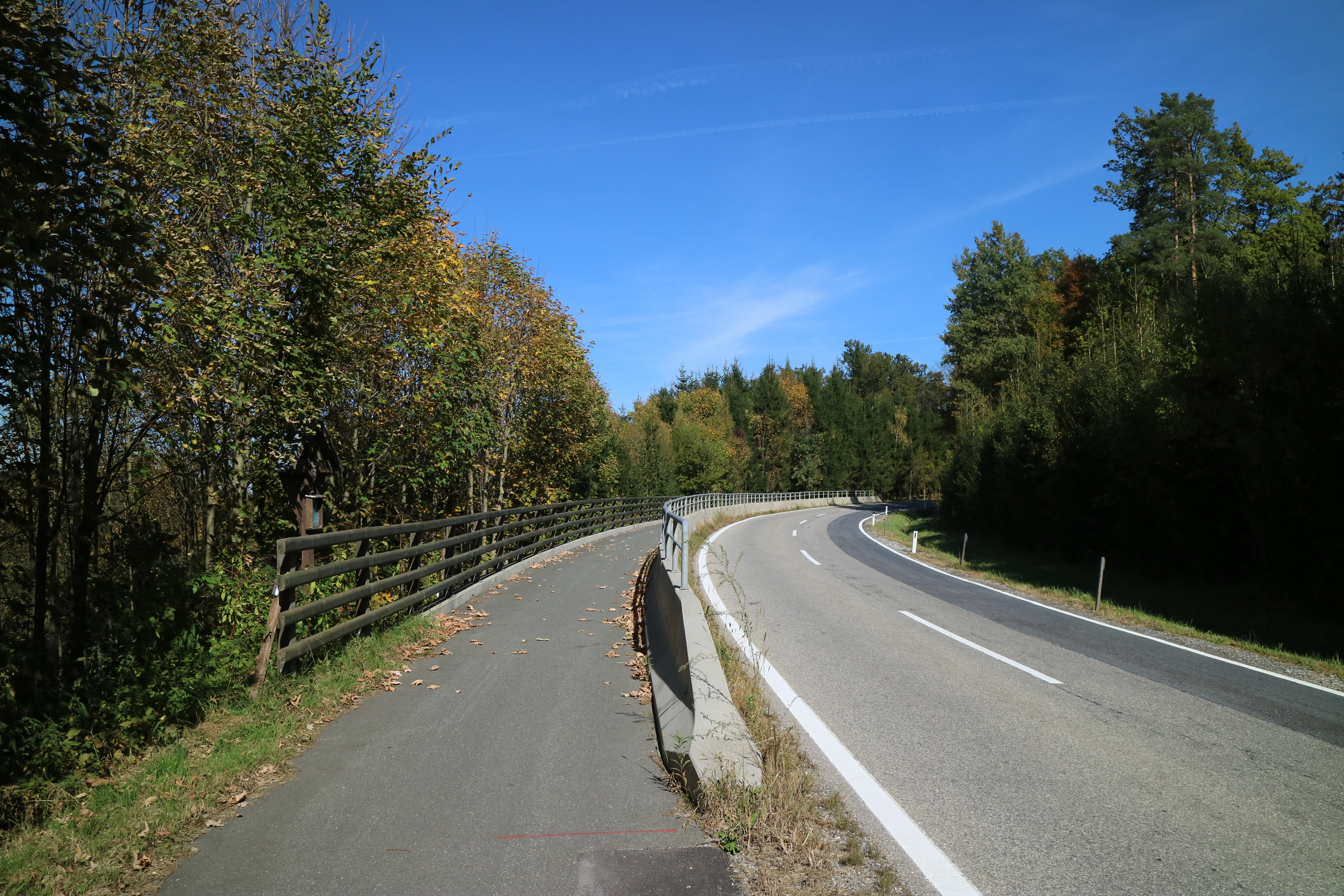
Archduke Johann Cycle Path (R 9)

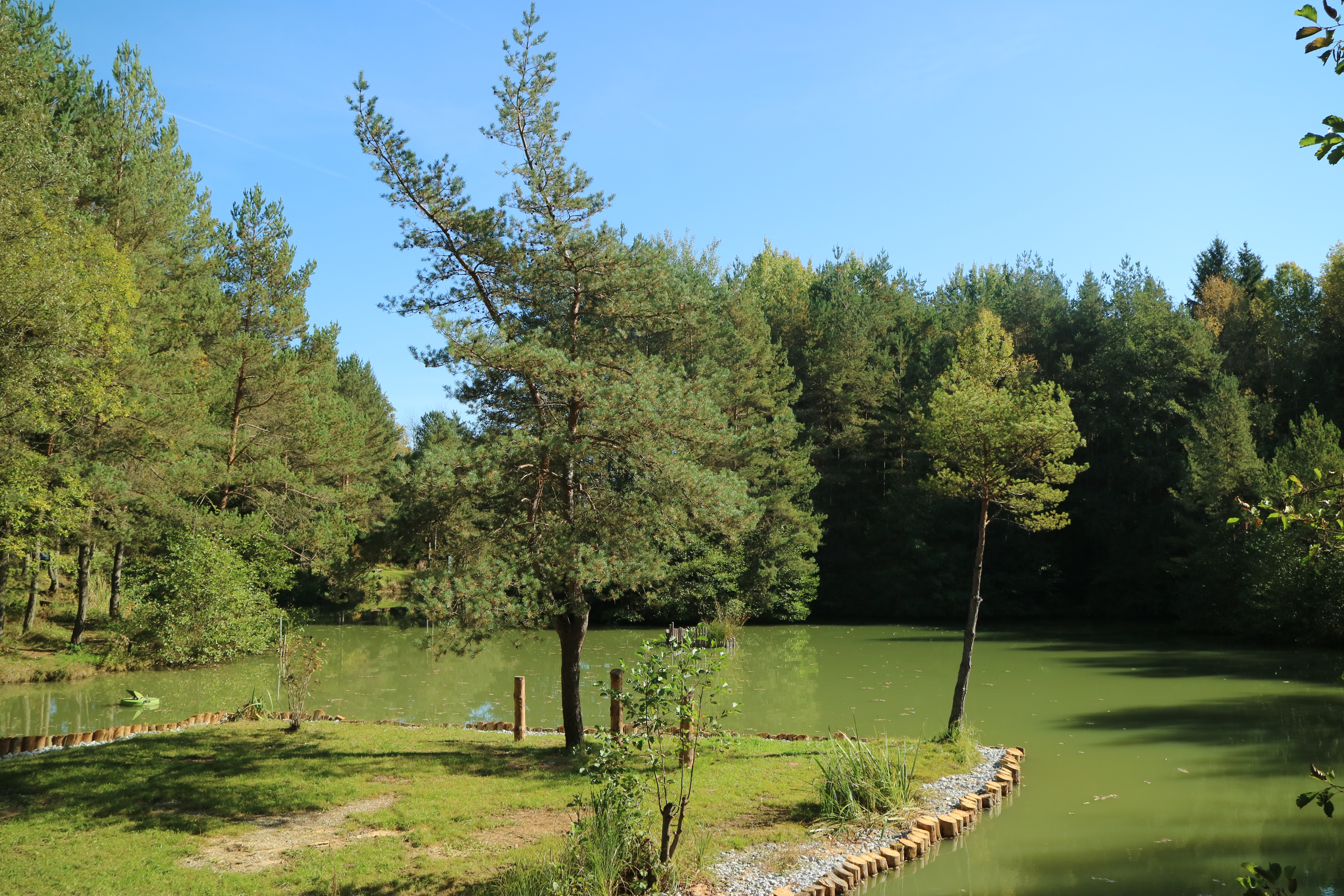
Island in the Windorf pond

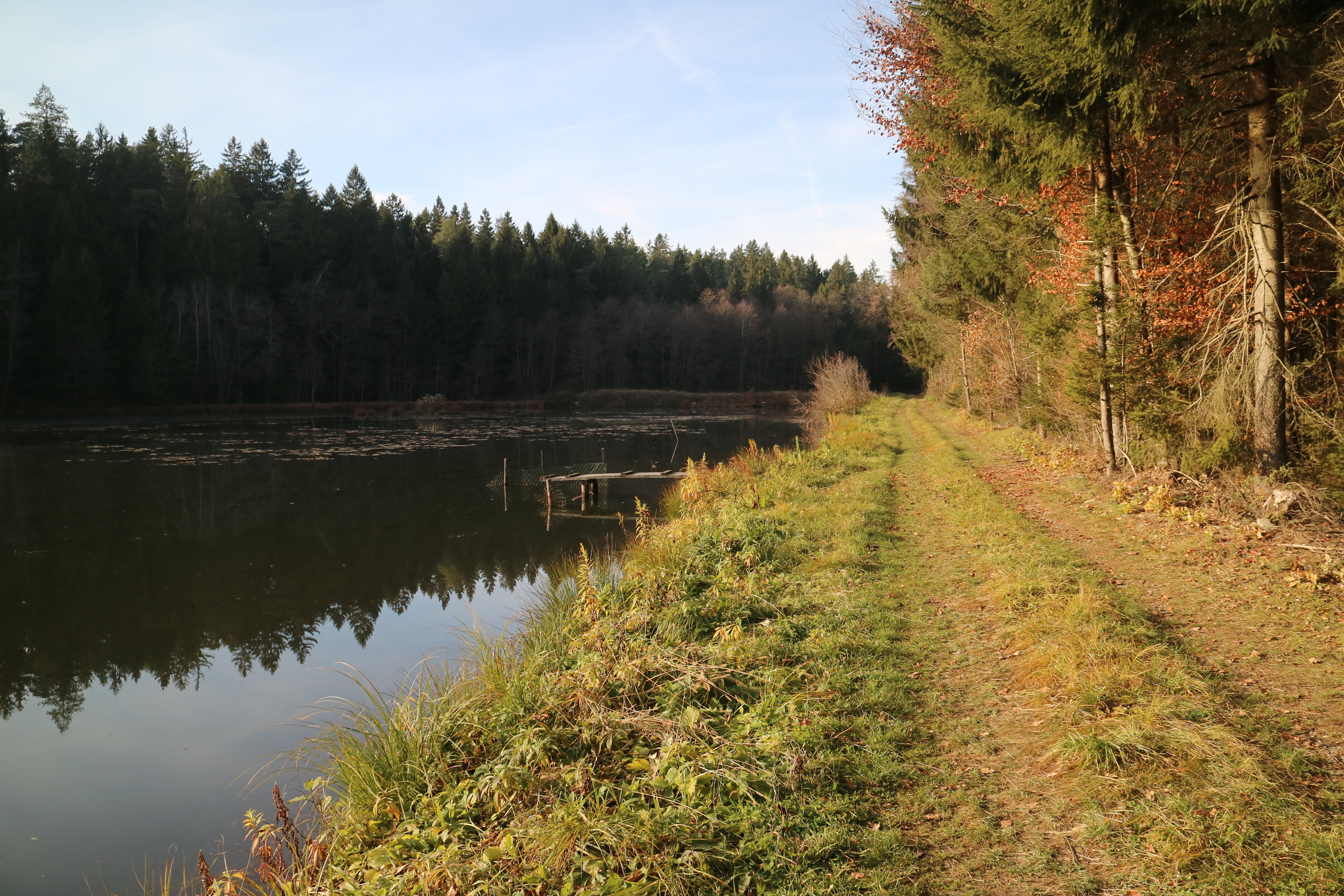
Hiking trail at Neuteich

=== Nature and landscape conservation ===
In addition to its recreational character, nature and landscape conservation is of great importance. As of 2017, there are two nature reserves, two landscape conservation areas and two protected landscape areas, one area designated as a "biotope" by the province of Styria and one European nature reserve (Natura 2000). The latter includes the Neuteich pond, the smallest of the four Wundschuh ponds, and protects the four-leaf clover fern (Marsilea quadrifolia) found there in accordance with Directive 92/43/EEC (Fauna-Flora-Habitat Directive) of the European Union. The nature reserve near Unterpremstätten, which protects a number of ponds on the former clay mining site, should also be highlighted. The brick ponds outside the forest had already been filled in for housing construction in 1989, which led to the disappearance of some rare plant species. The regional development program for the Styrian central region provides for a biotope network for the Kaiserwald in the Wundschuh area with the green zones of the Mur floodplains in Werndorf.

Photo	Designation	Abbreviation	Location	Surface area	Legal basis	Establishment
	Unterpremstätten: Gepringbach	Biotope 6168	Premstätten 46.9575°N 15.3878°E	6,55 ha	(Biotope mapping on behalf of the Styrian provincial government)	June 4, 1981
	Western mountain and Hügelland of Graz	LSG 29	Seiersberg-Pirka 46.9919°N 15.3844°E	5720 ha (Note: The landscape conservation area Westliches Berg- und Hügelland von Graz (LSG 29) comprises only a small part of the Kaiserwald in the municipality of Seiersberg-Pirka and consists mainly of the Plabutsch-Buchkogel range and the Thaler valley basin.)	Ordinance of the Styrian Provincial Government	June 29, 1981
	Wundschuh pond	LSG 32	Premstätten, Dobl-Zwaring, Wundschuh 46.9244°N 15.4308°E	576 ha	Ordinance of the Styrian Provincial Government	June 29, 1981
	Pond in Unterpremstätten	GLT 104	Premstätten 46.9674°N 15.3927°E	2,67 ha	Decision of the District Authority of the Graz region	May 19, 1983
	Windorf pond	GLT 108	Seiersberg-Pirka 46.9919°N 15.3844°E	6,05 ha	Decision of the District Authority of the Graz region	April 13, 1988
	Wetlands meadows Doblwiesen	NSG c 78	Dobl-Zwaring 46.9658°N 15.3711°E	1,02 ha	Ordinance of the District Authority of the Graz region	May 11, 1992
	Parts of the former clay extraction site	NSG c 65	Premstätten 46.9638°N 15.3955°E	3,21 ha	Ordinance of the District Authority of the Graz region	June 10, 1997
	Wundschuh-Neuteich pond	FFH No. 45	Wundschuh 46.9638°N 15.3955°E	3,1 ha	Ordinance of the Styrian Provincial Government	May 4, 2017

In addition, three objects in the Kaiserwald and in the area of the Kaiserwald Terrace have been declared natural monuments. In the municipality of Dobl-Zwaring, a large-leaved lime (Tilia platyphyllos) and a pedunculate oak (Quercus robur) were listed in 1979, and in the municipality of Wildon (then Weitendorf), parts of a basalt quarry were listed in 1985.

== Reception ==

In the neighboring community of Wundschuh, the Imperial Forest indirectly found its way into heraldry. The municipal coat of arms, granted in 1965, shows a black snake with a golden crown between two spruces. This motif goes back to the Middle High German place name "Wurmschach", where "wurm" refers to a snake and "schach" to a secluded forest. The remnants of the forest between the agricultural and industrial areas of the Grazer Field are still called Schachen forests. An actual "snake forest" is said to have existed in the form of a marsh in the Kaiserwald. In order to be protected from the bites of the poisonous reptiles, high fur boots had to be worn during the clearing work.

On November 5, 1933, the Kleine Zeitung printed the story The robber chief of the Kaiserwald by Karl Reiterer on its front page. The story is set in the Kaiserwald forest in 1787, where a dreaded band of robbers is up to mischief. When Oswald Morain, a wealthy merchant from Graz, fails to return from Trieste one day, he sends his maid Rosi to find him. The young girl disguises herself as a boy and takes a carriage to Premstätten. After being attacked by robbers, she not only finds the missing merchant Steffl, but is horrified to discover that her lover Hansl, who works as an ox-buyer for a smoking master, has become the chief of the bandits. Hansl had gambled away the 400 guilders for his last job in a Puntigam inn and, fearing to return empty-handed, accompanied his adversaries, two robbers, into the Imperial Forest. Rosi and Steffl report their plight to Graz, whereupon the military is sent to track down the bandits in the undergrowth of the forest. In Graz, the robbers, including "Schinderpeter" and "Rote Jöbstl," are put on trial. They escape the gallows, but are sentenced to several years' imprisonment in the Reckturm. Deeply saddened by the fate of her lover, Rosi turns to the Emperor himself during a visit to the city by Joseph II. She begs the Emperor to have mercy on her Hansl until he reduces his prison sentence. Rosi and Hansl later marry and establish the inn "Zum steirischen Hiesel" on Griesplatz.

In addition to the name of the highway rest area, the name Kaiserwald is also found in three street names in the surrounding area. There is the street Am Kaiserwald in Weitendorf and a Kaiserwaldweg in the Kaiserwaldsiedlung (municipality of Premstätten) as well as in Kasten (municipality of Wundschuh). The name of a street of the same name in the 9th district of Waltendorf, more than ten kilometers away, goes back to a local piece of forest.

== Bibliography and maps ==
- Marianne Grubinger: Die römischen Gräber im Kaiserwalde südlich von Graz. In: Historical Association for Styria (ed.): Blätter für Heimatkunde. 13th year. Graz 1935, pp. 101–107 (historischerverein-stmk.at [PDF]).
- Hans Peter Leditzky, Hans Zojer: Zur Hydrogeologie der Kaiserwaldterrasse. In: Mitteilungen der Abteilung für Geologie, Paläontologie und Bergbau am Landesmuseum Joanneum, Issue 39, Graz 1978, pp. 85–97.
- Heinrich Purkarthofer: Kaiserwald, Gjaidhof zu Dobl und Tobelbad. Von Forst und Bauernwald, Forstamt und Bad. In: Zeitschrift des Historischen Vereines für Steiermark, Volume 78, Graz 1987, p. 87–119.
- Austrian map 1:50,000, sheet 4229 (UTM). Federal Office of Metrology and Surveying (Austria)
