= Weitendorf, Styria =

Weitendorf
- Former municipality
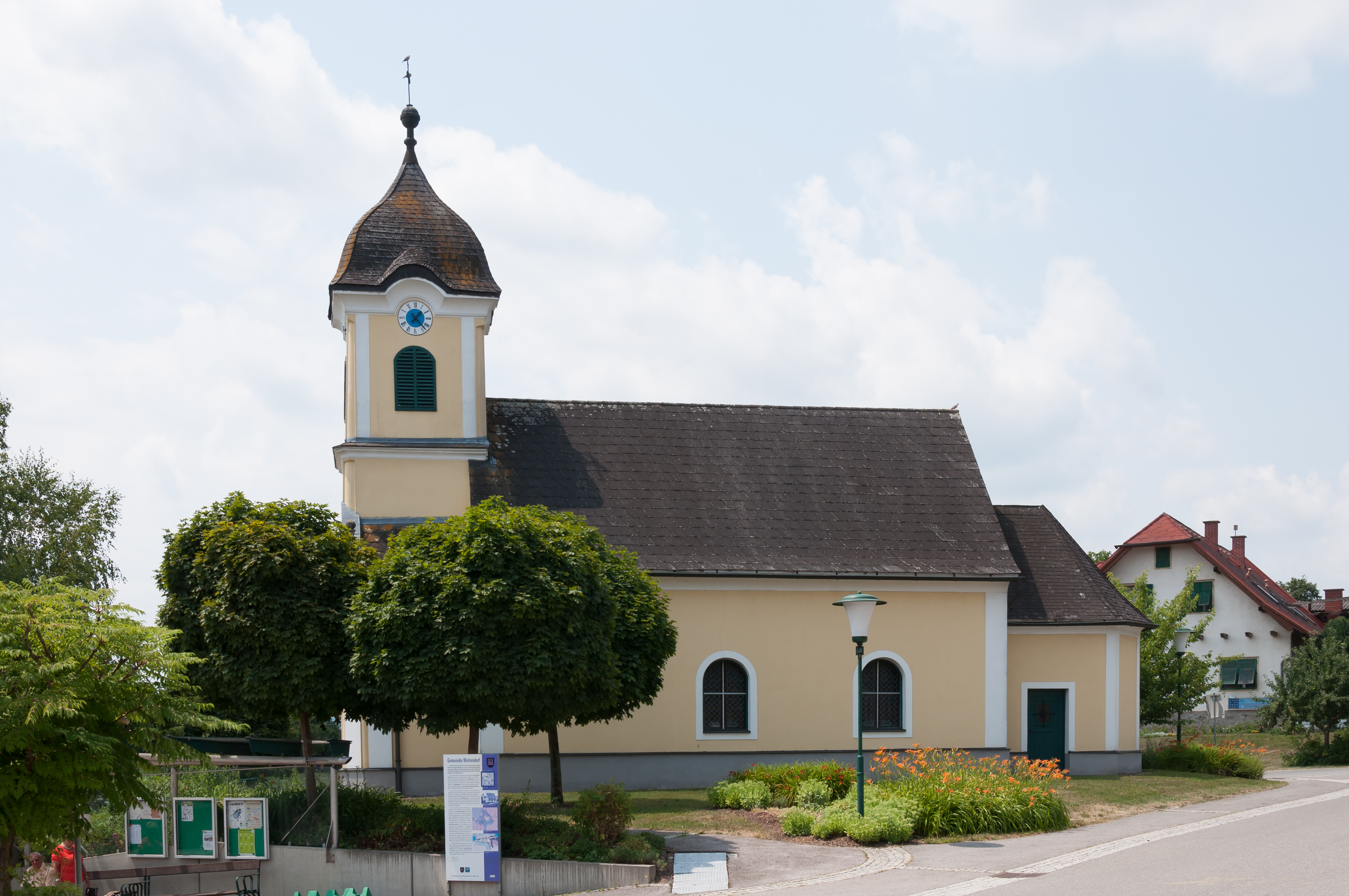
- Chapel in Weitendorf

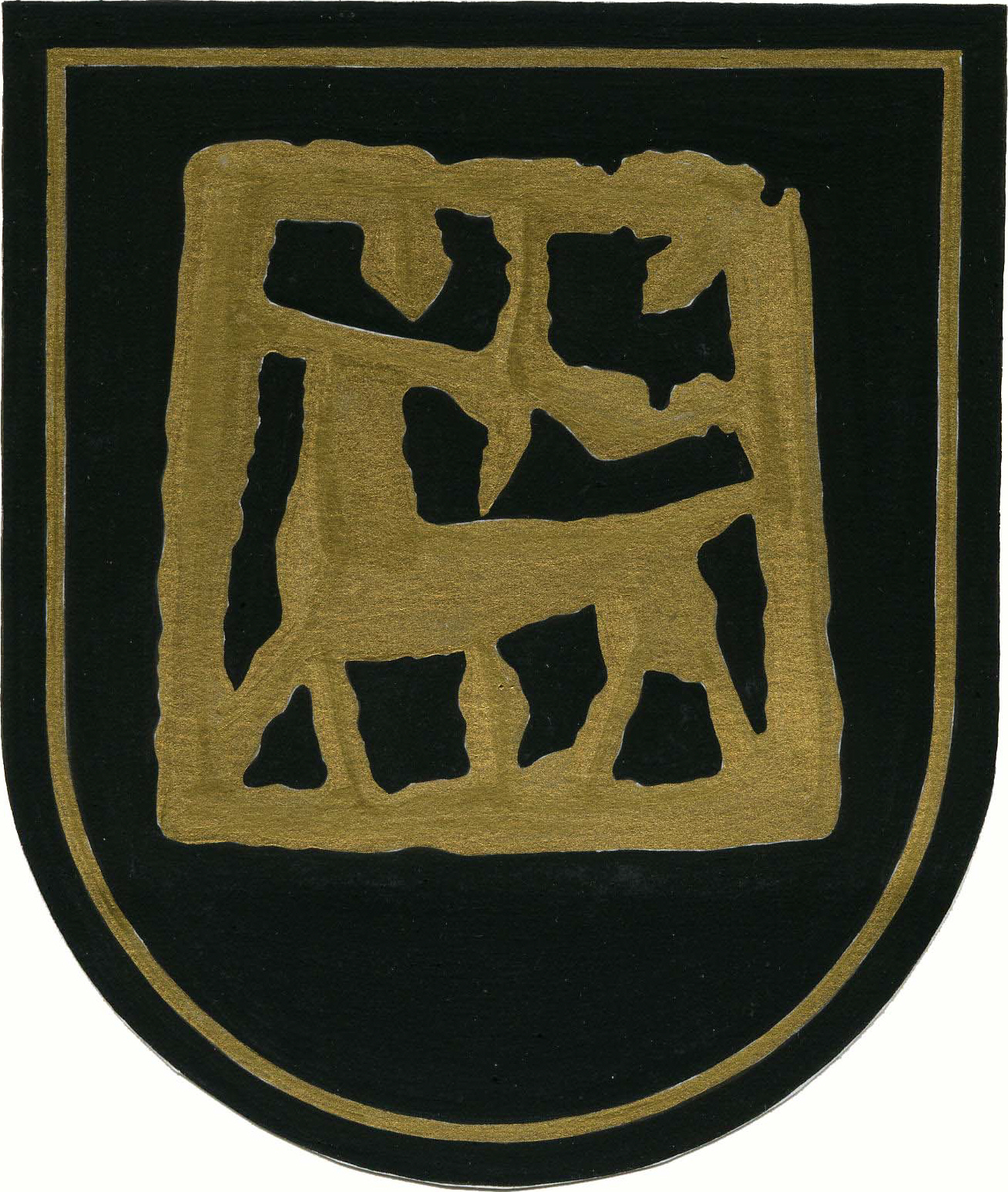
- Coat of arms

- Location within Austria
- Coordinates: 46°53′50.7″N 15°28′0.55″E
- Country: Austria
- State: Styria
- District: Leibnitz

Area
  - Total: 13.89 km^{2} (5.36 sq mi)
- Elevation: 317 m (1,040 ft)

Population (1 January 2016)
  - Total: 1,542
  - Density: 111.0/km^{2} (287.5/sq mi)
- Time zone: UTC+1 (CET)
  - Summer (DST): UTC+2 (CEST)
- Postal code: 8402, 8410
- Area code: 03182
- Vehicle registration: LB
- Website: www.weitendorf.at

Weitendorf (German pronunciation: [ˈvaɪtn̩dɔʁf]) is a former municipality in the district of Leibnitz in Austrian state of Styria. Since the 2015 Styria municipal structural reform, it is part of the municipality Wildon.

== Population ==
Historical population
Year	Pop.	±%
1869	911	—
1939	1,411	+54.9%
2009	1,527	+8.2%
