= Zettling =

- Former municipality
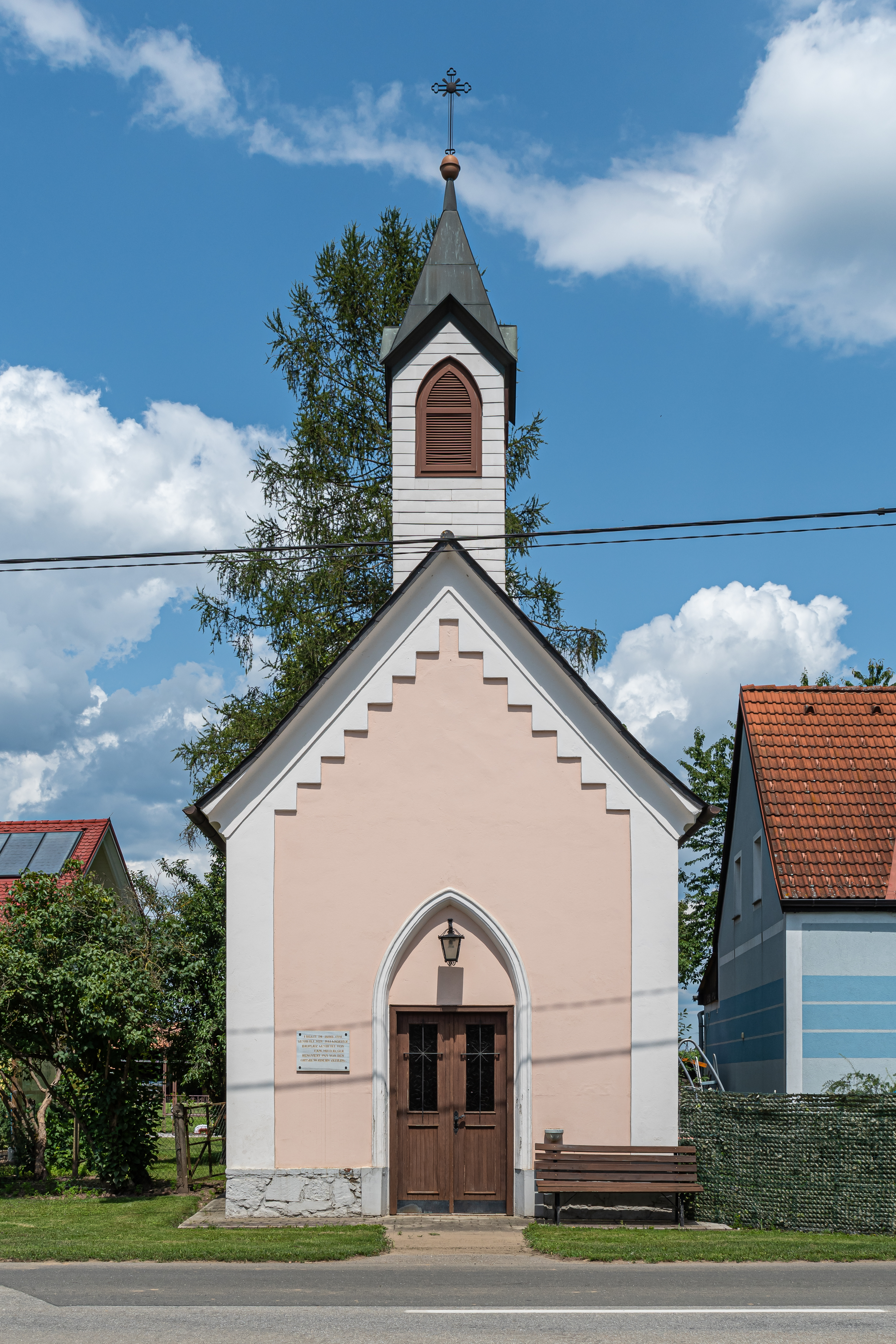
- Zettling chapel

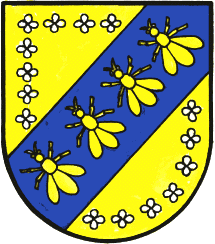
- Coat of arms

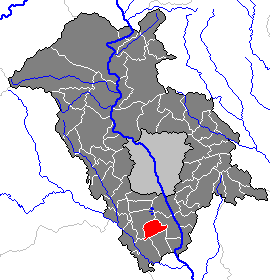
- Location within Graz-Umgebung district

- Location within Austria
- Coordinates: 46°57′07″N 15°26′04″E
- Country: Austria
- State: Styria
- District: Graz-Umgebung

Area
  - Total: 11.29 km^{2} (4.36 sq mi)
- Elevation: 325 m (1,066 ft)

Population (1 January 2016)
  - Total: 1,570
  - Density: 139/km^{2} (360/sq mi)
- Time zone: UTC+1 (CET)
  - Summer (DST): UTC+2 (CEST)
- Postal code: 8141, 8142
- Area code: 03135
- Vehicle registration: GU
- Website: www.zettling.co.at

Zettling (German pronunciation: [t͡sɛtlɪŋ]) is a former municipality in the district of Graz-Umgebung in the Austrian state of Styria. Since the 2015 Styria municipal structural reform, it is part of the municipality of Premstätten.

== Population ==
Historical population
Year	Pop.	±%
1869	592	—
1880	593	+0.2%
1890	620	+4.6%
1900	659	+6.3%
1910	681	+3.3%
1923	763	+12.0%
1934	809	+6.0%
1939	760	−6.1%
1951	850	+11.8%
1961	1,016	+19.5%
1971	1,091	+7.4%
1981	1,053	−3.5%
1991	1,117	+6.1%
2001	1,354	+21.2%
