= 2015 Tour of Austria =

2015 UCI Europe Tour

Race details
- Dates: 4–12 July
- Stages: 8 + Prologue
- Distance: 1,452.9 km (902.8 mi)

The 2015 Tour of Austria is the 67th edition of the Tour of Austria cycling stage race. It started in Wien on 4 July with a team time trial prologue, and concluded in Bregenz on 12 July. This was the first time in several years that the race consisted of 8 stages plus a prologue. It was part of the 2015 UCI Europe Tour, and was rated as a 2.HC event.

== Schedule ==
Stage	Date	Course	Distance	Type	Winner	Ref
P	4 July	Wien	5.3 km (3.3 mi)	Team time trial	Team Katusha	
1	5 July	Mörbisch to Scheibbs	206.6 km (128.4 mi)	Flat stage	Sondre Holst Enger (NOR)	
2	6 July	Litschau to Grieskirchen	196.1 km (121.9 mi)	Intermediate stage	David Tanner (AUS)	
3	7 July	Windischgarsten to Gratwein-Straßengel	181.1 km (112.5 mi)	Intermediate stage	Rick Zabel (GER)	
4	8 July	Stift Rein/Gratwein to Villacher Alpe/Dobratsch	207.4 km (128.9 mi)	Mountain stage	Víctor de la Parte (ESP)	
5	9 July	Villach/Dobrollach to Matrei in Osttirol	175 km (108.7 mi)	Flat stage	Johann Van Zyl (RSA)	
6	10 July	Lienz to Kitzbühler Horn Alpenhaus	164.7 km (102.3 mi)	Mountain stage	Víctor de la Parte (ESP)	
7	11 July	Kitzbühel to Innsbruck	124.7 km (77.5 mi)	Flat stage	Lukas Pöstlberger (AUT)	
8	12 July	Innsbruck-Völs to Bregenz	192 km (119.3 mi)	Mountain stage	Moreno Moser (ITA)	
Total		1,452.9 km (902.8 mi)				

== Teams ==
20 teams were invited to the 2015 Tour of Austria: 6 UCI ProTeams, 7 UCI Professional Continental Teams and 7 UCI Continental Teams.

UCI WorldTeams

- Team Katusha
- AG2R La Mondiale
- Tinkoff–Saxo
- BMC Racing Team
- IAM Cycling
- Cannondale–Garmin

UCI Professional Continental teams

- Bardiani–CSF
- Cofidis
- CCC–Sprandi–Polkowice
- MTN–Qhubeka
- Team Roompot
- Wanty–Groupe Gobert
- Cult Energy Pro Cycling

Continental teams

- Team Marseille 13 KTM
- Amplatz–BMC
- Hrinkow Advarics Cycleangteam
- Tirol Cycling Team
- Team Felbermayr–Simplon Wels
- Team Vorarlberg
- WSA-Greenlife

== Stages ==
=== Prologue ===
4 July 2015 — Wien, 5.3 km (3.3 mi) team time trial (TTT)

Result of prologue
Rank	Rider	Team	Time
1	Team Katusha	5' 45"	
2	MTN–Qhubeka	+1"	
3	BMC Racing Team	+5"	
4	Cofidis	+8"	
5	IAM Cycling	+8"	
6	Cannondale–Garmin	+8"	
7	Team Felbermayr - Simplon Wels	+10"	
8	AG2R La Mondiale	+11"	
9	Amplatz - BMC	+13"	
10	Team Roompot	+14"	
Source: ProCyclingStats

General classification after prologue
Rank	Rider	Team	Time
1	Rüdiger Selig (GER)	Team Katusha	5' 45"
2	Vladimir Isaychev (RUS)	Team Katusha	+0"
3	Gatis Smukulis (LAT)	Team Katusha	+0"
4	Daniel Moreno (ESP)	Team Katusha	+0"
5	Sven Erik Bystrøm (NOR)	Team Katusha	+0"
6	Egor Silin (RUS)	Team Katusha	+0"
7	Ángel Vicioso (ESP)	Team Katusha	+0"
8	Eduard Vorganov (RUS)	Team Katusha	+0"
9	Youcef Reguigui (ALG)	MTN–Qhubeka	+1"
10	Natnael Berhane (ERI)	MTN–Qhubeka	+1"
Source: ProCyclingStats

=== Stage 1 ===
5 July 2015 – Mörbisch to Scheibbs, 206.6 km (128.4 mi)

Stage 1 results

	Cyclist	Team	Time
1	Sondre Holst Enger (NOR)	IAM Cycling	5h 02' 07"
2	Paolo Simion (ITA)	Bardiani–CSF	s.t.
3	Gerald Ciolek (GER)	MTN–Qhubeka	s.t.
4	Grischa Janorschke (GER)	Team Vorarlberg	s.t.
5	Jan Tratnik (SLO)	Amplatz–BMC	s.t.
6	Sjoerd van Ginneken (NED)	Team Roompot	s.t.
7	Marco Marcato (ITA)	Wanty–Groupe Gobert	s.t.
8	Rüdiger Selig (GER)	Team Katusha	s.t.
9	Clément Koretzky (FRA)	Team Vorarlberg	s.t.
10	Troels Vinther (DEN)	Cult Energy Pro Cycling	s.t.

General Classification after Stage 1

	Cyclist	Team	Time
1	Gerald Ciolek (GER)	MTN–Qhubeka	5h 07' 49"
2	Rüdiger Selig (GER)	Team Katusha	+0"
3	Sondre Holst Enger (NOR)	IAM Cycling	+1"
4	Sven Erik Bystrøm (NOR)	Team Katusha	+1"
5	Ángel Vicioso (ESP)	Team Katusha	+2"
6	Eduard Vorganov (RUS)	Team Katusha	+3"
7	Egor Silin (RUS)	Team Katusha	+3"
8	Daniel Moreno (ESP)	Team Katusha	+3"
9	Natnael Berhane (ERI)	MTN–Qhubeka	+4"
10	Youcef Reguigui (ALG)	MTN–Qhubeka	+4"

=== Stage 2 ===
6 July 2015 – Litschau to Grieskirchen, 196.2 km (121.9 mi)

Stage 2 results

	Cyclist	Team	Time
1	David Tanner (AUS)	IAM Cycling	4h 53' 45"
2	Clément Venturini (FRA)	Cofidis	+1"
3	Péter Kusztor (HUN)	Amplatz–BMC	+2"
4	Troels Vinther (DEN)	Cult Energy Pro Cycling	+2"
5	Jan Tratnik (SLO)	Amplatz–BMC	+2"
6	Robert Kišerlovski (CRO)	Tinkoff–Saxo	+2"
7	Brent Bookwalter (USA)	BMC Racing Team	+2"
8	Rudy Molard (FRA)	Cofidis	+2"
9	Gerald Ciolek (GER)	MTN–Qhubeka	+2"
10	Ben Hermans (BEL)	BMC Racing Team	+2"

General Classification after Stage 2

	Cyclist	Team	Time
1	Gerald Ciolek (GER)	MTN–Qhubeka	10h 01' 33"
2	David Tanner (AUS)	IAM Cycling	+2"
3	Ángel Vicioso (ESP)	Team Katusha	+5"
4	Eduard Vorganov (RUS)	Team Katusha	+6"
5	Clément Venturini (FRA)	Cofidis	+7"
6	Sven Erik Bystrøm (NOR)	Team Katusha	+9"
7	Ben Hermans (BEL)	BMC Racing Team	+11"
8	Brent Bookwalter (USA)	BMC Racing Team	+11"
9	Egor Silin (RUS)	Team Katusha	+11"
10	Daniel Moreno (ESP)	Team Katusha	+11"

=== Stage 3 ===
7 July 2015 – Windischgarsten to Judendorf-Straßengel, 181.1 km (112.5 mi)

Stage 3 results

	Cyclist	Team	Time
1	Rick Zabel (GER)	BMC Racing Team	4h 23' 06"
2	Ángel Vicioso (ESP)	Team Katusha	s.t.
3	Jan Tratnik (SLO)	Amplatz–BMC	s.t.
4	Kristian Sbaragli (ITA)	MTN–Qhubeka	s.t.
5	Romain Hardy (FRA)	Cofidis	s.t.
6	Marco Marcato (ITA)	Wanty–Groupe Gobert	s.t.
7	Brent Bookwalter (USA)	BMC Racing Team	s.t.
8	Andi Bajc (SLO)	Amplatz–BMC	s.t.
9	Troels Vinther (DEN)	Cult Energy Pro Cycling	s.t.
10	Clément Koretzky (FRA)	Team Vorarlberg	s.t.

General Classification after Stage 3

	Cyclist	Team	Time
1	Ángel Vicioso (ESP)	Team Katusha	14h 24' 36"
2	Gerald Ciolek (GER)	MTN–Qhubeka	+1"
3	Rick Zabel (GER)	BMC Racing Team	+2"
4	David Tanner (AUS)	IAM Cycling	+5"
5	Sven Erik Bystrøm (NOR)	Team Katusha	+5"
6	Eduard Vorganov (RUS)	Team Katusha	+7"
7	Egor Silin (RUS)	Team Katusha	+7"
8	Natnael Berhane (ERI)	MTN–Qhubeka	+8"
9	Ben Hermans (BEL)	BMC Racing Team	+12"
10	Brent Bookwalter (USA)	BMC Racing Team	+12"

=== Stage 4 ===
8 July 2015 – Stift Rein/Gratwein to Dobratsch, 181.1 km (112.5 mi)

Stage 4 results

	Cyclist	Team	Time
1	Víctor de la Parte (ESP)	Team Vorarlberg	5h 43' 50"
2	Jan Hirt (CZE)	CCC–Sprandi–Polkowice	s.t.
3	Ben Hermans (BEL)	BMC Racing Team	+9"
4	Paweł Poljański (POL)	Tinkoff–Saxo	+14"
5	Pierre Latour (FRA)	AG2R La Mondiale	+14"
6	Natnael Berhane (ERI)	MTN–Qhubeka	+22"
7	Stéphane Rossetto (FRA)	Cofidis	+32"
8	Egor Silin (RUS)	Team Katusha	+46"
9	Gregor Mühlberger (AUT)	Team Felbermayr–Simplon Wels	+46"
10	Brent Bookwalter (USA)	BMC Racing Team	+50"

General Classification after Stage 4

	Cyclist	Team	Time
1	Jan Hirt (CZE)	CCC–Sprandi–Polkowice	20h 08' 41"
2	Ben Hermans (BEL)	BMC Racing Team	+2"
3	Víctor de la Parte (ESP)	Team Vorarlberg	+3"
4	Natnael Berhane (ERI)	MTN–Qhubeka	+15"
5	Pierre Latour (FRA)	AG2R La Mondiale	+17"
6	Paweł Poljański (POL)	Tinkoff–Saxo	+23"
7	Stéphane Rossetto (FRA)	Cofidis	+32"
8	Egor Silin (RUS)	Team Katusha	+38"
9	Brent Bookwalter (USA)	BMC Racing Team	+47"
10	Gregor Mühlberger (AUT)	Team Felbermayr–Simplon Wels	+48"

=== Stage 5 ===
9 July 2015 – Faaker See/Drobollach to Matrei in Osttirol, 175.0 km (108.7 mi)

Stage 5 results

	Cyclist	Team	Time
1	Johann van Zyl (RSA)	MTN–Qhubeka	3h 42' 33"
2	David Tanner (AUS)	IAM Cycling	+6"
3	Rick Zabel (GER)	BMC Racing Team	+6"
4	Ángel Vicioso (ESP)	Team Katusha	+6"
5	Marco Marcato (ITA)	Wanty–Groupe Gobert	+6"
6	Clément Venturini (FRA)	Cofidis	+6"
7	Clemens Fankhauser (AUT)	Hrinkow Advarics Cycleangteam	+6"
8	Maciej Paterski (POL)	CCC–Sprandi–Polkowice	+6"
9	Brent Bookwalter (USA)	BMC Racing Team	+6"
10	Andrea Piechele (ITA)	Bardiani–CSF	+6"

General Classification after Stage 5

	Cyclist	Team	Time
1	Jan Hirt (CZE)	CCC–Sprandi–Polkowice	23h 51' 20"
2	Ben Hermans (BEL)	BMC Racing Team	+2"
3	Víctor de la Parte (ESP)	Team Vorarlberg	+3"
4	Natnael Berhane (ERI)	MTN–Qhubeka	+15"
5	Pierre Latour (FRA)	AG2R La Mondiale	+17"
6	Paweł Poljański (POL)	Tinkoff–Saxo	+23"
7	Egor Silin (RUS)	Team Katusha	+38"
8	Brent Bookwalter (USA)	BMC Racing Team	+47"
9	Gregor Mühlberger (AUT)	Team Felbermayr–Simplon Wels	+48"
10	Thomas Degand (BEL)	IAM Cycling	+52"

=== Stage 6 ===
10 July 2015 – Lienz to Kitzbüheler Horn, 164.7 km (102.3 mi)

Stage 6 results

	Cyclist	Team	Time
1	Víctor de la Parte (ESP)	Team Vorarlberg	4h 54' 46"
2	Ben Hermans (BEL)	BMC Racing Team	+1' 18"
3	Jan Hirt (CZE)	CCC–Sprandi–Polkowice	+1' 29"
4	Hubert Dupont (FRA)	AG2R La Mondiale	+1' 51"
5	Natnael Berhane (ERI)	MTN–Qhubeka	+1' 54"
6	Dylan Teuns (BEL)	BMC Racing Team	+2' 15"
7	Thomas Degand (BEL)	IAM Cycling	+2' 17"
8	Brent Bookwalter (USA)	BMC Racing Team	+2' 17"
9	Egor Silin (RUS)	Team Katusha	+2' 17"
~~10~~	~~Stefan Denifl (AUT)~~	~~IAM Cycling~~	~~+2' 24"~~
11	Jure Golčer (SLO)	Team Felbermayr–Simplon Wels	+2' 40"

General Classification after Stage 6

	Cyclist	Team	Time
1	Víctor de la Parte (ESP)	Team Vorarlberg	28h 45' 59"
2	Ben Hermans (BEL)	BMC Racing Team	+1' 21"
3	Jan Hirt (CZE)	CCC–Sprandi–Polkowice	+1' 32"
4	Natnael Berhane (ERI)	MTN–Qhubeka	+2' 16"
5	Egor Silin (RUS)	Team Katusha	+3' 02"
6	Brent Bookwalter (USA)	BMC Racing Team	+3' 11"
7	Thomas Degand (BEL)	IAM Cycling	+3' 16"
8	Pierre Latour (FRA)	AG2R La Mondiale	+3' 18"
9	Paweł Poljański (POL)	Tinkoff–Saxo	+3' 20"
~~10~~	~~Stefan Denifl (AUT)~~	~~IAM Cycling~~	~~+3' 34"~~
11	Dylan Teuns (BEL)	BMC Racing Team	+4' 11"

=== Stage 7 ===
11 July 2015 – Kitzbühel to Innsbruck, 124.7 km (77.5 mi)

Stage 7 results

	Cyclist	Team	Time
1	Lukas Pöstlberger (AUT)	Tirol Cycling Team	2h 34' 09"
2	Eduard Vorganov (RUS)	Team Katusha	+13"
3	Moreno Moser (ITA)	Cannondale–Garmin	+13"
4	Brent Bookwalter (USA)	BMC Racing Team	+13"
5	Gert Jõeäär (EST)	Cofidis	+13"
6	Sebastian Baldauf (GER)	Hrinkow Advarics Cycleangteam	+13"
7	Troels Vinther (DEN)	Cult Energy Pro Cycling	+13"
8	Jan Tratnik (SLO)	Amplatz–BMC	+13"
9	Marco Marcato (ITA)	Wanty–Groupe Gobert	+13"
10	Michael Gogl (AUT)	Tirol Cycling Team	+13"

General Classification after Stage 7

	Cyclist	Team	Time
1	Víctor de la Parte (ESP)	Team Vorarlberg	31h 21' 18"
2	Ben Hermans (BEL)	BMC Racing Team	+1' 21"
3	Jan Hirt (CZE)	CCC–Sprandi–Polkowice	+1' 32"
4	Brent Bookwalter (USA)	BMC Racing Team	+2' 13"
5	Natnael Berhane (ERI)	MTN–Qhubeka	+2' 16"
6	Egor Silin (RUS)	Team Katusha	+3' 02"
7	Thomas Degand (BEL)	IAM Cycling	+3' 16"
8	Pierre Latour (FRA)	AG2R La Mondiale	+3' 18"
9	Paweł Poljański (POL)	Tinkoff–Saxo	+3' 20"
~~10~~	~~Stefan Denifl (AUT)~~	~~IAM Cycling~~	~~+3' 34"~~
11	Dylan Teuns (BEL)	BMC Racing Team	+4' 11"

=== Stage 8 ===
12 July 2015 – Innsbruck to Bregenz, 184.3 km (114.5 mi)

Stage 8 results

	Cyclist	Team	Time
1	Moreno Moser (ITA)	Cannondale–Garmin	4h 44' 36"
2	David Tanner (AUS)	IAM Cycling	s.t.
3	Clément Venturini (FRA)	Cofidis	s.t.
4	Evaldas Šiškevičius (LTU)	Team Marseille 13 KTM	s.t.
5	Romain Hardy (FRA)	Cofidis	s.t.
6	Jan Tratnik (SLO)	Amplatz–BMC	s.t.
7	Davide Villella (ITA)	Cannondale–Garmin	s.t.
8	Brent Bookwalter (USA)	BMC Racing Team	s.t.
9	Ángel Vicioso (ESP)	Team Katusha	s.t.
10	Florian Bissinger (GER)	WSA–Greenlife	s.t.

General Classification after Stage 8

	Cyclist	Team	Time
1	Víctor de la Parte (ESP)	Team Vorarlberg	36h 05' 54"
2	Ben Hermans (BEL)	BMC Racing Team	+1' 21"
3	Jan Hirt (CZE)	CCC–Sprandi–Polkowice	+1' 32"
4	Brent Bookwalter (USA)	BMC Racing Team	+2' 13"
5	Natnael Berhane (ERI)	MTN–Qhubeka	+2' 16"
6	Egor Silin (RUS)	Team Katusha	+3' 00"
7	Pierre Latour (FRA)	AG2R La Mondiale	+3' 12"
8	Thomas Degand (BEL)	IAM Cycling	+3' 16"
9	Paweł Poljański (POL)	Tinkoff–Saxo	+3' 20"
~~10~~	~~Stefan Denifl (AUT)~~	~~IAM Cycling~~	~~+3' 34"~~
11	Dylan Teuns (BEL)	BMC Racing Team	+4' 11"

== Classification leadership table ==
Stage	Winner	General classification	Points classification	Mountains classification	Best Austrian Rider classification	Team classification
P	Team Katusha	Rüdiger Selig	not awarded	not awarded	Matthias Krizek	Team Katusha
1	Sondre Holst Enger	Gerald Ciolek	Sondre Holst Enger	Daniel Lehner	Matthias Krizek	Team Katusha
2	David Tanner	Gerald Ciolek	Gerald Ciolek	Matthias Krizek	Matthias Krizek	Team Katusha
3	Rick Zabel	Ángel Vicioso	Jan Tratnik	Matthias Krizek	Stephan Rabitsch	Team Katusha
4	Víctor de la Parte	Jan Hirt	Jan Tratnik	Víctor de la Parte	Gregor Mühlberger	BMC Racing Team
5	Johann Van Zyl	Jan Hirt	Jan Tratnik	Víctor de la Parte	Gregor Mühlberger	BMC Racing Team
6	Víctor de la Parte	Víctor de la Parte	Jan Tratnik	Felix Großschartner	Stefan Denifl	BMC Racing Team
7	Lukas Pöstlberger	Víctor de la Parte	Jan Tratnik	Felix Großschartner	Stefan Denifl	BMC Racing Team
8	Moreno Moser	Víctor de la Parte	Jan Tratnik	Felix Großschartner	Stefan Denifl	BMC Racing Team
Final		Víctor de la Parte	Jan Tratnik	Felix Großschartner	Stefan Denifl	BMC Racing Team
