= Thomas Degand =

Belgian cyclist

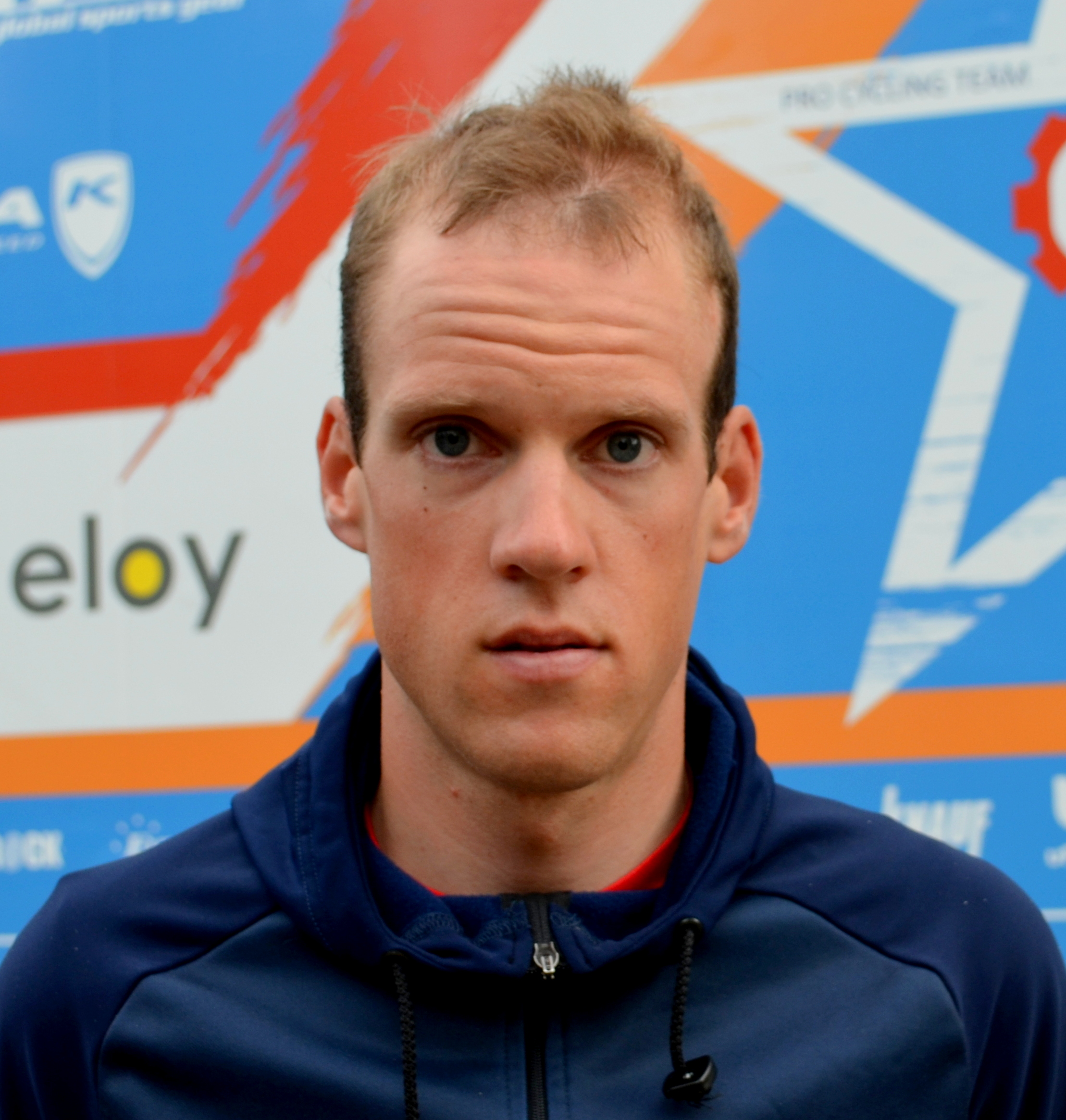
- Degand in 2014.

Personal information
- Born: 13 May 1986 (age 40) Ronse, Belgium
- Height: 1.76 m (5 ft 9 1/2 in)
- Weight: 63 kg (139 lb; 9 st 13 lb)

Cycling career
- Sport: Cycling
- Discipline: Road
- Role: Rider
- Rider type: Climber

Amateur team
- 2007–2008: Storez–Ledecq Matériaux

Professional teams
- 2009–2014: Verandas Willems
- 2015: IAM Cycling
- 2016–2020: Wanty–Groupe Gobert

Thomas Degand (born 13 May 1986) is a Belgian racing cyclist, who most recently rode for UCI ProTeam Circus–Wanty Gobert.

He rode at the 2014 UCI Road World Championships, and was named in the start list for the 2015 Vuelta a España but he withdrew from the race after a crash. After spending the 2015 season riding for IAM Cycling, in September 2015 it was announced that he would return to his previous team Wanty–Groupe Gobert on an initial two-year contract from 2016. In June 2017, he was named in the startlist for the Tour de France.

== Major results ==
2008
3rd Grand Prix Criquielion
4th Flèche Ardennaise
2009
2nd Grand Prix Criquielion
8th Flèche Ardennaise
10th Paris–Mantes-en-Yvelines
2010
1st Circuit de Wallonie
1st Flèche Ardennaise
7th Overall Rhône-Alpes Isère Tour
7th Omloop Het Nieuwsblad Beloften
9th Overall Ronde de l'Oise
2011
3rd Overall Paris–Corrèze
5th Overall Tour du Limousin
5th Overall Tour of South Africa
6th Overall Tour de Wallonie
7th Overall Route du Sud
2014
2nd Overall Tour du Gévaudan Languedoc-Roussillon

1st Stage 1

6th Overall Tour Méditerranéen
7th Overall Vuelta a Andalucía
10th Overall Tour of Austria
2015
8th Overall Tour of Austria
2017
1st Overall Tour du Jura
2018
4th Volta Limburg Classic
6th Overall Tour du Limousin
9th Boucles de l'Aulne

=== Grand Tour general classification results timeline ===
Grand Tour	2015	2016	2017	2018
Giro d'Italia	—	—	—	—
Tour de France	—	—	34	54
Vuelta a España	DNF	—	—	—

Legend
—	Did not compete
DNF	Did not finish
