= 2014 Tour of Austria =

2014 UCI Europe Tour

Race details
- Dates: 6–13 July 2014
- Stages: 8
- Distance: 1,216.5 km (755.9 mi)
- Winning time: 29h 45' 40"

Results
Jersey awarded to the overall winner	Winner	Peter Kennaugh (GBR)	(Team Sky)
	Second	Javier Moreno (ESP)	(Movistar Team)
	Third	Damiano Caruso (ITA)	(Cannondale)
Jersey awarded to the points classification winner	Points	Peter Kennaugh (GBR)	(Team Sky)
Jersey awarded to the mountains classification winner	Mountains	Maxim Belkov (RUS)	(Team Katusha)
Jersey awarded to the young rider classification winner	Young rider	Patrick Konrad (AUT)	(Gourmetfein–Simplon Wels)
	Team	(Spain) Movistar Team	

The 2014 Tour of Austria (German: 2014 Internationale Österreich Rundfahrt) was the 66th edition of the Tour of Austria, an annual bicycle race. Departing from Tulln on July 6, concluded in Vienna on July 13. The 1,216.5-kilometre (755.9-mile) long stage race is part of the 2014 UCI Europe Tour, and is rated as a 2.HC event.

== Schedule ==
Stage	Date	Course	Distance	Type	Winner	Ref
1	6 July	Tulln to Sonntagberg	182 km (113.1 mi)	Mountain stage	Peter Kennaugh (GBR)	
2	7 July	Waidhofen an der Ybbs to Bad Ischl	180.9 km (112.4 mi)	Hilly stage	Oscar Gatto (ITA)	
3	8 July	Bad Ischl to Kitzbüheler Horn	206 km (128.0 mi)	Mountain stage	Dayer Quintana (COL)	
4	9 July	Kitzbühel to Matrei in Osttirol	171.9 km (106.8 mi)	Mountain stage	Oscar Gatto (ITA)	
5	10 July	Matrei in Osttirol to Sankt Johann im Pongau	146.4 km (91.0 mi)	Mountain stage	Jesse Sergent (NZL)	
6	11 July	Sankt Johann im Pongau to Villach	182.4 km (113.3 mi)	Mountain stage	Evgeni Petrov (RUS)	
7	12 July	Podersdorf am See to Podersdorf am See	24.1 km (15.0 mi)	Individual time trial	Kristof Vandewalle (BEL)	
8	13 July	Podersdorf am See to Vienna	122.8 km (76.3 mi)	Flat stage	Marco Haller (AUT)	
Total		1,216.5 km (755.9 mi)				

== Teams ==
19 teams were invited to participate in the tour: 10 UCI ProTeams, 3 UCI Professional Continental Teams and 6 UCI Continental Teams.

UCI ProTeams
- Astana
- BMC Racing Team
- Cannondale
- Garmin–Sharp
- Lotto–Belisol
- Movistar Team
- Team Katusha
- Team Sky
- Tinkoff–Saxo
- Trek Factory Racing
UCI Professional Continental Teams
- Bardiani–CSF
- Cofidis
- Wanty–Groupe Gobert
UCI Continental Teams
- Amplatz–BMC
- Gebrüder Weiss–Oberndorfer
- Gourmetfein–Simplon Wels
- Team Vorarlberg
- Tirol Cycling Team
- WSA–Greenlife

== Stages ==
=== Stage 1 ===
6 July 2014 – Tulln to Sonntagberg, 182 km (113 mi)

Stage 1 Result

	Rider	Team	Time
1	Peter Kennaugh (GBR)	Team Sky	4h 32' 22"
2	Oliver Zaugg (SUI)	Tinkoff–Saxo	+ 11"
3	Javier Moreno (ESP)	Movistar Team	+ 18"
4	Damiano Caruso (ITA)	Cannondale	+ 21"
5	Ben Hermans (BEL)	BMC Racing Team	+ 21"
6	Patrick Konrad (AUT)	Gourmetfein–Simplon Wels	+ 25"
7	Eros Capecchi (ITA)	Movistar Team	+ 30"
8	Dan Martin (IRL)	Garmin–Sharp	+ 31"
9	Kanstantsin Sivtsov (BLR)	Team Sky	+ 36"
10	Jure Golčer (SLO)	Gourmetfein–Simplon Wels	+ 36"

General Classification after Stage 1

	Rider	Team	Time
1	Peter Kennaugh (GBR)	Team Sky	4h 32' 12"
2	Oliver Zaugg (SUI)	Tinkoff–Saxo	+ 15"
3	Javier Moreno (ESP)	Movistar Team	+ 24"
4	Damiano Caruso (ITA)	Cannondale	+ 31"
5	Ben Hermans (BEL)	BMC Racing Team	+ 31"
6	Patrick Konrad (AUT)	Gourmetfein–Simplon Wels	+ 35"
7	Eros Capecchi (ITA)	Movistar Team	+ 40"
8	Dan Martin (IRL)	Garmin–Sharp	+ 41"
9	Kanstantsin Sivtsov (BLR)	Team Sky	+ 46"
10	Jure Golčer (SLO)	Gourmetfein–Simplon Wels	+ 46"

=== Stage 2 ===
7 July 2014 – Waidhofen an der Ybbs to Bad Ischl, 180.9 km (112.4 mi)

Stage 2 Result

	Rider	Team	Time
1	Oscar Gatto (ITA)	Cannondale	4h 25' 53"
2	Juan José Lobato (ESP)	Movistar Team	+ 0"
3	Marco Haller (AUT)	Team Katusha	+ 0"
4	Jonas Vangenechten (BEL)	Lotto–Belisol	+ 0"
5	Jay McCarthy (AUS)	Tinkoff–Saxo	+ 0"
6	Tim De Troyer (BEL)	Wanty–Groupe Gobert	+ 0"
7	Fabian Schnaidt (GER)	Team Vorarlberg	+ 0"
8	Jacopo Guarnieri (ITA)	Astana	+ 0"
9	Jan Tratnik (SLO)	Amplatz–BMC	+ 0"
10	Wesley Kreder (NED)	Wanty–Groupe Gobert	+ 0"

General Classification after Stage 2

	Rider	Team	Time
1	Peter Kennaugh (GBR)	Team Sky	8h 58' 05"
2	Oliver Zaugg (SUI)	Tinkoff–Saxo	+ 15"
3	Javier Moreno (ESP)	Movistar Team	+ 24"
4	Damiano Caruso (ITA)	Cannondale	+ 31"
5	Ben Hermans (BEL)	BMC Racing Team	+ 31"
6	Patrick Konrad (AUT)	Gourmetfein–Simplon Wels	+ 35"
7	Eros Capecchi (ITA)	Movistar Team	+ 40"
8	Dan Martin (IRL)	Garmin–Sharp	+ 41"
9	Kanstantsin Sivtsov (BLR)	Team Sky	+ 46"
10	Jure Golčer (SLO)	Gourmetfein–Simplon Wels	+ 46"

=== Stage 3 ===
8 July 2014 – Bad Ischl to Kitzbüheler Horn, 206 km (128 mi)

Stage 3 Result

	Rider	Team	Time
1	Dayer Quintana (COL)	Movistar Team	5h 13' 16"
2	Damiano Caruso (ITA)	Cannondale	+ 54"
3	Peter Kennaugh (GBR)	Team Sky	+ 54"
4	Javier Moreno (ESP)	Movistar Team	+ 1' 06"
5	Patrick Konrad (AUT)	Gourmetfein–Simplon Wels	+ 1' 25"
6	Guillaume Levarlet (FRA)	Cofidis	+ 1' 34"
7	Jérôme Coppel (FRA)	Cofidis	+ 1' 34"
8	Oliver Zaugg (SUI)	Tinkoff–Saxo	+ 1' 42"
9	Jure Golčer (SLO)	Gourmetfein–Simplon Wels	+ 1' 49"
10	Eros Capecchi (ITA)	Movistar Team	+ 1' 56"

General Classification after Stage 3

	Rider	Team	Time
1	Peter Kennaugh (GBR)	Team Sky	14h 12' 11"
2	Damiano Caruso (ITA)	Cannondale	+ 29"
3	Javier Moreno (ESP)	Movistar Team	+ 40"
4	Oliver Zaugg (SUI)	Tinkoff–Saxo	+ 1' 07"
5	Patrick Konrad (AUT)	Gourmetfein–Simplon Wels	+ 1' 10"
6	Jure Golčer (SLO)	Gourmetfein–Simplon Wels	+ 1' 45"
7	Eros Capecchi (ITA)	Movistar Team	+ 1' 46"
8	Jérôme Coppel (FRA)	Cofidis	+ 1' 59"
9	Dan Martin (IRL)	Garmin–Sharp	+ 2' 37"
10	Jesper Hansen (DEN)	Tinkoff–Saxo	+ 2' 38"

=== Stage 4 ===
9 July 2014 – Kitzbühel to Matrei in Osttirol, 171.9 km (106.8 mi)

Stage 4 Result

	Rider	Team	Time
1	Oscar Gatto (ITA)	Cannondale	4h 14' 08"
2	Juan José Lobato (ESP)	Movistar Team	+ 0"
3	Marco Haller (AUT)	Team Katusha	+ 0"
4	Fabio Felline (ITA)	Trek Factory Racing	+ 0"
5	Nicola Boem (ITA)	Bardiani–CSF	+ 0"
6	Francesco Gavazzi (ITA)	Astana	+ 0"
7	Rick Zabel (GER)	BMC Racing Team	+ 0"
8	Sebastian Lander (DEN)	BMC Racing Team	+ 0"
9	Damiano Caruso (ITA)	Cannondale	+ 0"
10	Peter Kennaugh (GBR)	Team Sky	+ 0"

General Classification after Stage 4

	Rider	Team	Time
1	Peter Kennaugh (GBR)	Team Sky	18h 26' 19"
2	Damiano Caruso (ITA)	Cannondale	+ 29"
3	Javier Moreno (ESP)	Movistar Team	+ 40"
4	Oliver Zaugg (SUI)	Tinkoff–Saxo	+ 1' 07"
5	Patrick Konrad (AUT)	Gourmetfein–Simplon Wels	+ 1' 10"
6	Jure Golčer (SLO)	Gourmetfein–Simplon Wels	+ 1' 45"
7	Eros Capecchi (ITA)	Movistar Team	+ 1' 46"
8	Jérôme Coppel (FRA)	Cofidis	+ 1' 59"
9	Jesper Hansen (DEN)	Tinkoff–Saxo	+ 2' 38"
10	Dayer Quintana (COL)	Movistar Team	+ 2' 39"

=== Stage 5 ===
10 July 2014 – Matrei in Osttirol to Sankt Johann im Pongau, 146.4 km (91.0 mi)

Stage 5 Result

	Rider	Team	Time
1	Jesse Sergent (NZL)	Trek Factory Racing	3h 57' 04"
2	Yoann Bagot (FRA)	Cofidis	+ 49"
3	Patrick Konrad (AUT)	Gourmetfein–Simplon Wels	+ 57"
4	Damiano Caruso (ITA)	Cannondale	+ 57"
5	Dan Martin (IRL)	Garmin–Sharp	+ 57"
6	Javier Moreno (ESP)	Movistar Team	+ 57"
7	Peter Kennaugh (GBR)	Team Sky	+ 57"
8	Oliver Zaugg (SUI)	Tinkoff–Saxo	+ 57"
9	Riccardo Zoidl (AUT)	Trek Factory Racing	+ 57"
10	Thomas Degand (BEL)	Wanty–Groupe Gobert	+ 57"

General Classification after Stage 5

	Rider	Team	Time
1	Peter Kennaugh (GBR)	Team Sky	22h 24' 20"
2	Damiano Caruso (ITA)	Cannondale	+ 29"
3	Javier Moreno (ESP)	Movistar Team	+ 40"
4	Patrick Konrad (AUT)	Gourmetfein–Simplon Wels	+ 1' 06"
5	Oliver Zaugg (SUI)	Tinkoff–Saxo	+ 1' 07"
6	Jure Golčer (SLO)	Gourmetfein–Simplon Wels	+ 1' 50"
7	Eros Capecchi (ITA)	Movistar Team	+ 1' 51"
8	Jérôme Coppel (FRA)	Cofidis	+ 2' 04"
9	Dayer Quintana (COL)	Movistar Team	+ 2' 44"
10	Jesper Hansen (DEN)	Tinkoff–Saxo	+ 2' 50"

=== Stage 6 ===
11 July 2014 – Sankt Johann im Pongau to Villach, 182.4 km (113.3 mi)

Stage 6 Result

	Rider	Team	Time
1	Evgeni Petrov (RUS)	Tinkoff–Saxo	4h 48' 37"
2	Dayer Quintana (COL)	Movistar Team	+ 24"
3	Peter Kennaugh (GBR)	Team Sky	+ 26"
4	Riccardo Zoidl (AUT)	Trek Factory Racing	+ 26"
5	Oliver Zaugg (SUI)	Tinkoff–Saxo	+ 32"
6	Javier Moreno (ESP)	Movistar Team	+ 44"
7	Damiano Caruso (ITA)	Cannondale	+ 1' 20"
8	Larry Warbasse (USA)	BMC Racing Team	+ 1' 25"
9	Thomas Degand (BEL)	Wanty–Groupe Gobert	+ 1' 25"
10	Jure Golčer (SLO)	Gourmetfein–Simplon Wels	+ 1' 37"

General Classification after Stage 6

	Rider	Team	Time
1	Peter Kennaugh (GBR)	Team Sky	27h 13' 19"
2	Javier Moreno (ESP)	Movistar Team	+ 1' 02"
3	Oliver Zaugg (SUI)	Tinkoff–Saxo	+ 1' 17"
4	Damiano Caruso (ITA)	Cannondale	+ 1' 27"
5	Patrick Konrad (AUT)	Gourmetfein–Simplon Wels	+ 2' 35"
6	Dayer Quintana (COL)	Movistar Team	+ 2' 40"
7	Jure Golčer (SLO)	Gourmetfein–Simplon Wels	+ 3' 05"
8	Eros Capecchi (ITA)	Movistar Team	+ 3' 11"
9	Riccardo Zoidl (AUT)	Trek Factory Racing	+ 3' 18"
10	Jérôme Coppel (FRA)	Cofidis	+ 3' 26"

=== Stage 7 ===
12 July 2014 – Podersdorf am See to Podersdorf am See, 24.1 km (15.0 mi), individual time trial (ITT)

Stage 7 Result

	Rider	Team	Time
1	Kristof Vandewalle (BEL)	Trek Factory Racing	27' 50"
2	Jesse Sergent (NZL)	Trek Factory Racing	+ 15"
3	Manuel Quinziato (ITA)	BMC Racing Team	+ 18"
4	Danilo Hondo (GER)	Trek Factory Racing	+ 38"
5	Bob Jungels (LUX)	Trek Factory Racing	+ 42"
6	Kanstantsin Sivtsov (BLR)	Team Sky	+ 44"
7	Gert Jõeäär (EST)	Cofidis	+ 48"
8	Stijn Devolder (BEL)	Trek Factory Racing	+ 56"
9	Riccardo Zoidl (AUT)	Trek Factory Racing	+ 57"
10	Jérôme Coppel (FRA)	Cofidis	+ 1' 00"

General Classification after Stage 7

	Rider	Team	Time
1	Peter Kennaugh (GBR)	Team Sky	27h 42' 32"
2	Javier Moreno (ESP)	Movistar Team	+ 1' 03"
3	Damiano Caruso (ITA)	Cannondale	+ 1' 42"
4	Patrick Konrad (AUT)	Gourmetfein–Simplon Wels	+ 2' 50"
5	Riccardo Zoidl (AUT)	Trek Factory Racing	+ 2' 52"
6	Jérôme Coppel (FRA)	Cofidis	+ 3' 03"
7	Oliver Zaugg (SUI)	Tinkoff–Saxo	+ 3' 07"
8	Jure Golčer (SLO)	Gourmetfein–Simplon Wels	+ 3' 47"
9	Dayer Quintana (COL)	Movistar Team	+ 4' 14"
10	Thomas Degand (BEL)	Wanty–Groupe Gobert	+ 4' 15"

=== Stage 8 ===
13 July 2014 – Podersdorf am See to Vienna, 122.8 km (76.3 mi)

Stage 8 Result

	Rider	Team	Time
1	Marco Haller (AUT)	Team Katusha	2h 03' 08"
2	Jacopo Guarnieri (ITA)	Astana	+ 0"
3	Raymond Kreder (NED)	Garmin–Sharp	+ 0"
4	Boris Vallée (BEL)	Lotto–Belisol	+ 0"
5	Alexey Lutsenko (KAZ)	Astana	+ 0"
6	Fábio Silvestre (POR)	Trek Factory Racing	+ 0"
7	Andrea Piechele (ITA)	Bardiani–CSF	+ 0"
8	Clément Venturini (FRA)	Cofidis	+ 0"
9	Damiano Caruso (ITA)	Cannondale	+ 0"
10	Daniel Biedermann (AUT)	Gourmetfein–Simplon Wels	+ 0"

Final General Classification

	Rider	Team	Time
1	Peter Kennaugh (GBR)	Team Sky	29h 45' 40"
2	Javier Moreno (ESP)	Movistar Team	+ 1' 03"
3	Damiano Caruso (ITA)	Cannondale	+ 1' 42"
4	Patrick Konrad (AUT)	Gourmetfein–Simplon Wels	+ 2' 50"
5	Riccardo Zoidl (AUT)	Trek Factory Racing	+ 2' 52"
6	Jérôme Coppel (FRA)	Cofidis	+ 3' 03"
7	Oliver Zaugg (SUI)	Tinkoff–Saxo	+ 3' 07"
8	Jure Golčer (SLO)	Gourmetfein–Simplon Wels	+ 3' 47"
9	Dayer Quintana (COL)	Movistar Team	+ 4' 14"
10	Thomas Degand (BEL)	Wanty–Groupe Gobert	+ 4' 15"

== Classification leadership ==
Stage	Winner	General classification	Points classification	Mountains classification	Young rider classification	Team classification
1	Peter Kennaugh	Peter Kennaugh	Peter Kennaugh	Maxim Belkov	Patrick Konrad	Gourmetfein–Simplon Wels
2	Oscar Gatto	Peter Kennaugh	Peter Kennaugh	Maxim Belkov	Patrick Konrad	Gourmetfein–Simplon Wels
3	Dayer Quintana	Peter Kennaugh	Peter Kennaugh	Maxim Belkov	Patrick Konrad	Movistar Team
4	Oscar Gatto	Peter Kennaugh	Oscar Gatto	Maxim Belkov	Patrick Konrad	Movistar Team
5	Jesse Sergent	Peter Kennaugh	Peter Kennaugh	Maxim Belkov	Patrick Konrad	Movistar Team
6	Evgeni Petrov	Peter Kennaugh	Peter Kennaugh	Maxim Belkov	Patrick Konrad	Movistar Team
7	Kristof Vandewalle	Peter Kennaugh	Peter Kennaugh	Maxim Belkov	Patrick Konrad	Movistar Team
8	Marco Haller	Peter Kennaugh	Peter Kennaugh	Maxim Belkov	Patrick Konrad	Movistar Team
Final		Peter Kennaugh	Peter Kennaugh	Maxim Belkov	Patrick Konrad	Movistar Team

== Standings ==
Legend
Yellow jersey	Denotes the leader of the General classification	Grey jersey	Denotes the leader of the Points classification
Polkadot jersey	Denotes the leader of the Mountains classification	White jersey	Denotes the leader of the Young rider classification

=== General classification ===
	Rider	Team	Time
1	Peter Kennaugh (GBR)	Team Sky	29h 45' 40"
2	Javier Moreno (ESP)	Movistar Team	+ 1' 03"
3	Damiano Caruso (ITA)	Cannondale	+ 1' 42"
4	Patrick Konrad (AUT)	Gourmetfein–Simplon Wels	+ 2' 50"
5	Riccardo Zoidl (AUT)	Trek Factory Racing	+ 2' 52"
6	Jérôme Coppel (FRA)	Cofidis	+ 3' 03"
7	Oliver Zaugg (SUI)	Tinkoff–Saxo	+ 3' 07"
8	Jure Golčer (SLO)	Gourmetfein–Simplon Wels	+ 3' 47"
9	Dayer Quintana (COL)	Movistar Team	+ 4' 14"
10	Thomas Degand (BEL)	Wanty–Groupe Gobert	+ 4' 15"

=== Points classification ===
	Rider	Team	Points
1	Peter Kennaugh (GBR)	Team Sky	42
2	Damiano Caruso (ITA)	Cannondale	39
3	Marco Haller (AUT)	Team Katusha	35
4	Oscar Gatto (ITA)	Cannondale	30
5	Javier Moreno (ESP)	Movistar Team	30
6	Dayer Quintana (COL)	Movistar Team	27
7	Jesse Sergent (NZL)	Trek Factory Racing	27
8	Oliver Zaugg (SUI)	Tinkoff–Saxo	27
9	Juan José Lobato (ESP)	Movistar Team	24
10	Patrick Konrad (AUT)	Gourmetfein–Simplon Wels	23

=== Mountains classification ===
	Rider	Team	Points
1	Maxim Belkov (RUS)	Team Katusha	37
2	Dayer Quintana (COL)	Movistar Team	23
3	Peter Kennaugh (GBR)	Team Sky	22
4	Marco Canola (ITA)	Bardiani–CSF	20
5	Clemens Fankhauser (AUT)	Tirol Cycling Team	20
6	Gregor Mühlberger (AUT)	Tirol Cycling Team	19
7	Jesse Sergent (NZL)	Trek Factory Racing	19
8	Yoann Bagot (FRA)	Cofidis	16
9	Marco Minnaard (NED)	Wanty–Groupe Gobert	14
10	Damiano Caruso (ITA)	Cannondale	13

=== Young rider classification ===
	Rider	Team	Time
1	Patrick Konrad (AUT)	Gourmetfein–Simplon Wels	29h 48' 30"
2	Dayer Quintana (COL)	Movistar Team	+ 1' 24"
3	Bob Jungels (LUX)	Trek Factory Racing	+ 4' 16"
4	Frederik Backaert (BEL)	Wanty–Groupe Gobert	+ 9' 03"
5	Larry Warbasse (USA)	BMC Racing Team	+ 12' 09"
6	David Wöhrer (AUT)	Tirol Cycling Team	+ 16' 09"
7	Jesper Hansen (DEN)	Tinkoff–Saxo	+ 23' 20"
8	Pawel Poljanski (POL)	Tinkoff–Saxo	+ 25' 55"
9	Nathan Brown (USA)	Garmin–Sharp	+ 26' 00"
10	Daniil Fominykh (KAZ)	Astana	+ 26' 26"

=== Team classification ===
	Team	Points
1	Movistar Team	89h 23' 03"
2	Tinkoff–Saxo	+ 5' 49"
3	Gourmetfein–Simplon Wels	+ 7' 16"
4	Cofidis	+ 8' 39"
5	Wanty–Groupe Gobert	+ 18' 21"
6	Team Sky	+ 23' 44"
7	Trek Factory Racing	+ 31' 09"
8	BMC Racing Team	+ 36' 43"
9	Cannondale	+ 47' 32"
10	Astana	+ 49' 44"
