= Gschnaidt =

- Former municipality
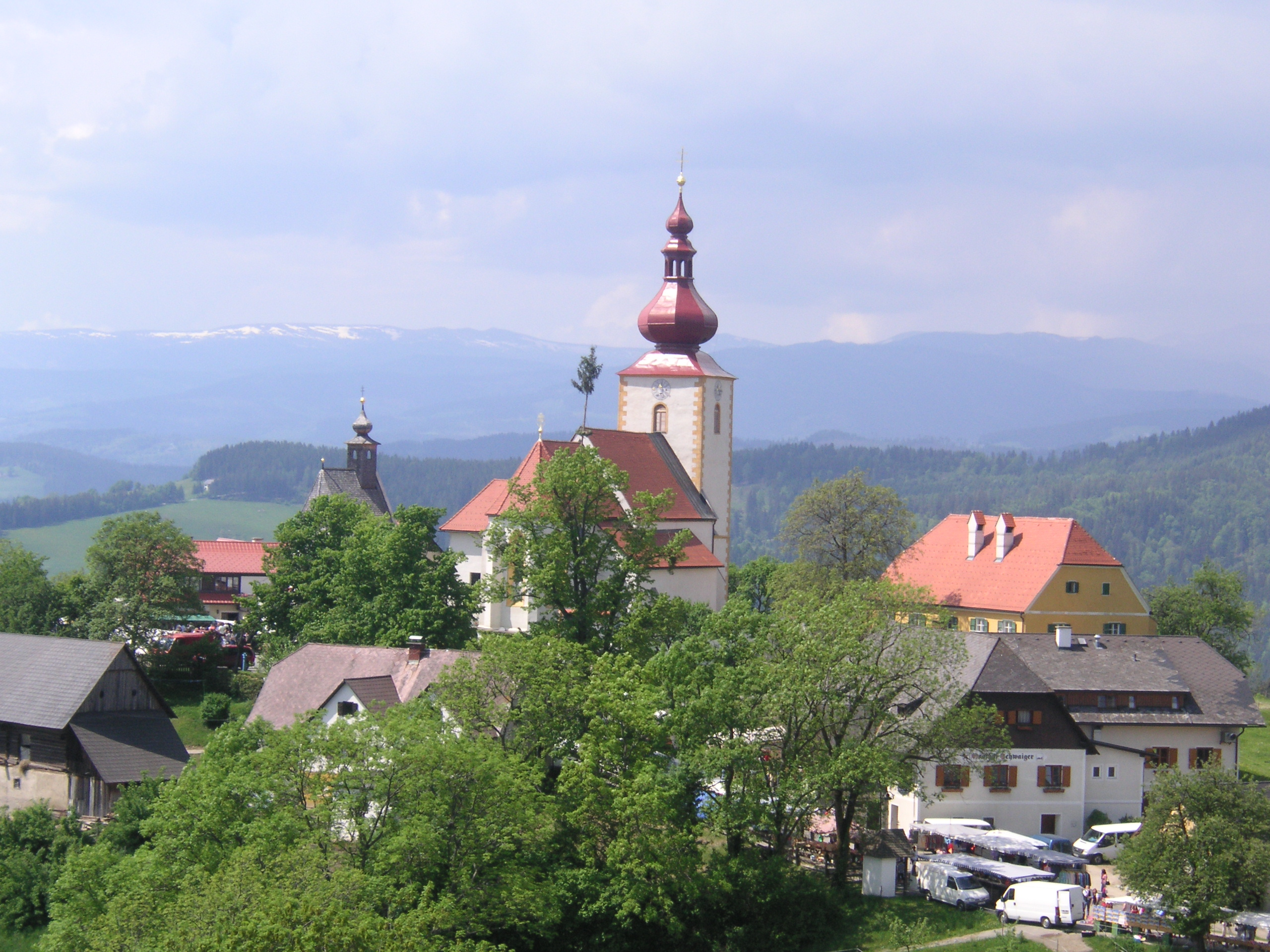
- View of Sankt Pankrazen in Gschnaidt

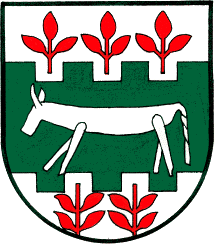
- Coat of arms

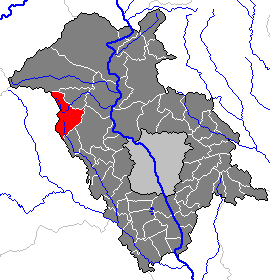
- Location within Graz-Umgebung district

- Location within Austria
- Coordinates: 47°08′12″N 15°11′8″E
- Country: Austria
- State: Styria
- District: Graz-Umgebung

Area
  - Total: 29.82 km^{2} (11.51 sq mi)
- Elevation: 769 m (2,523 ft)

Population (1 January 2016)
  - Total: 341
  - Density: 11.4/km^{2} (29.6/sq mi)
- Time zone: UTC+1 (CET)
  - Summer (DST): UTC+2 (CEST)
- Postal code: 8153
- Area code: 03149
- Vehicle registration: GU

Gschnaidt is a former municipality in the district of Graz-Umgebung in the Austrian state of Styria. Since the 2015 Styria municipal structural reform, it is part of the municipality Gratwein-Straßengel.

== Population ==
Historical population
Year	Pop.	±%
1869	818	—
1880	681	−16.7%
1890	688	+1.0%
1900	701	+1.9%
1910	674	−3.9%
1923	610	−9.5%
1934	636	+4.3%
1939	617	−3.0%
1951	585	−5.2%
1961	487	−16.8%
1971	443	−9.0%
1981	410	−7.4%
1991	370	−9.8%
2001	400	+8.1%
