= Pilgrimage Church Maria Straßengel =

Church in Gratwein-Straßengel, Austria

Coordinates: 47°07′N 15°21′E

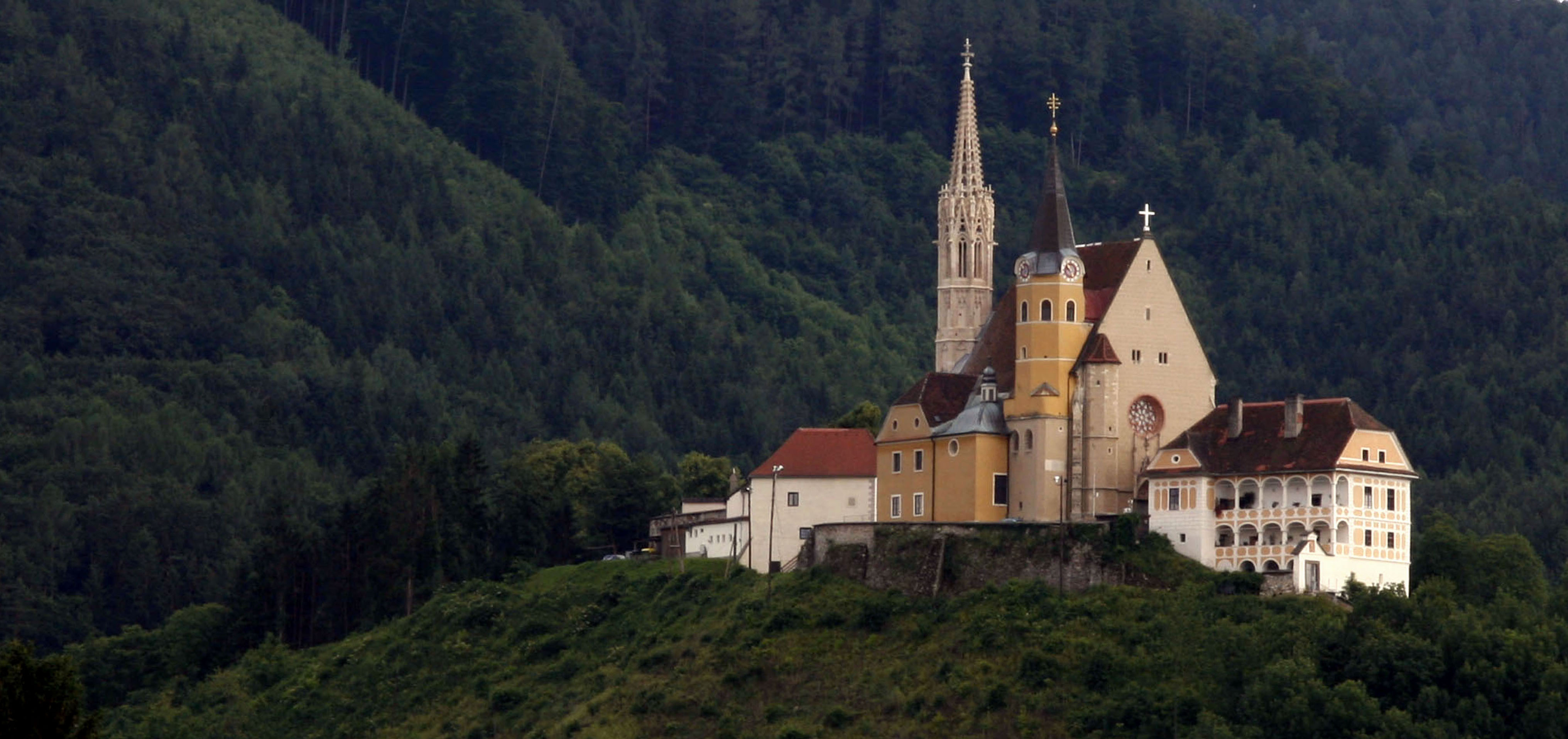
Pilgrimage Church Maria Straßengel

The Pilgrimage Church Maria Straßengel (German: Wallfahrtskirche Maria Straßengel) is a fourteenth century Gothic church located on a hill overlooking the market town of Judendorf-Straßengel in the district of Graz-Umgebung, a few kilometres northwest of Graz, Austria on the right bank of the Mur river. The town was first mentioned in the year AD 860 as Strazinolum.

The fourteenth century Gothic pilgrimage church was constructed between 1346 and 1355, and contains an important high altar. Once surrounded by fortified walls and guarded by a three-story tower (1355–66) with elaborate stonemasonry, the church still retains 77 sections of its fourteenth century Gothic stained-glass windows. The original plans for the high altar in white marble (1885) were originally drawn by Johann Bernhard Fischer von Erlach in 1687 but never carried out. The pilgrimage church contains a piece of tree root shaped like Jesus on the cross. This root is not displayed to the public, but shown to people on request.

== Gallery ==
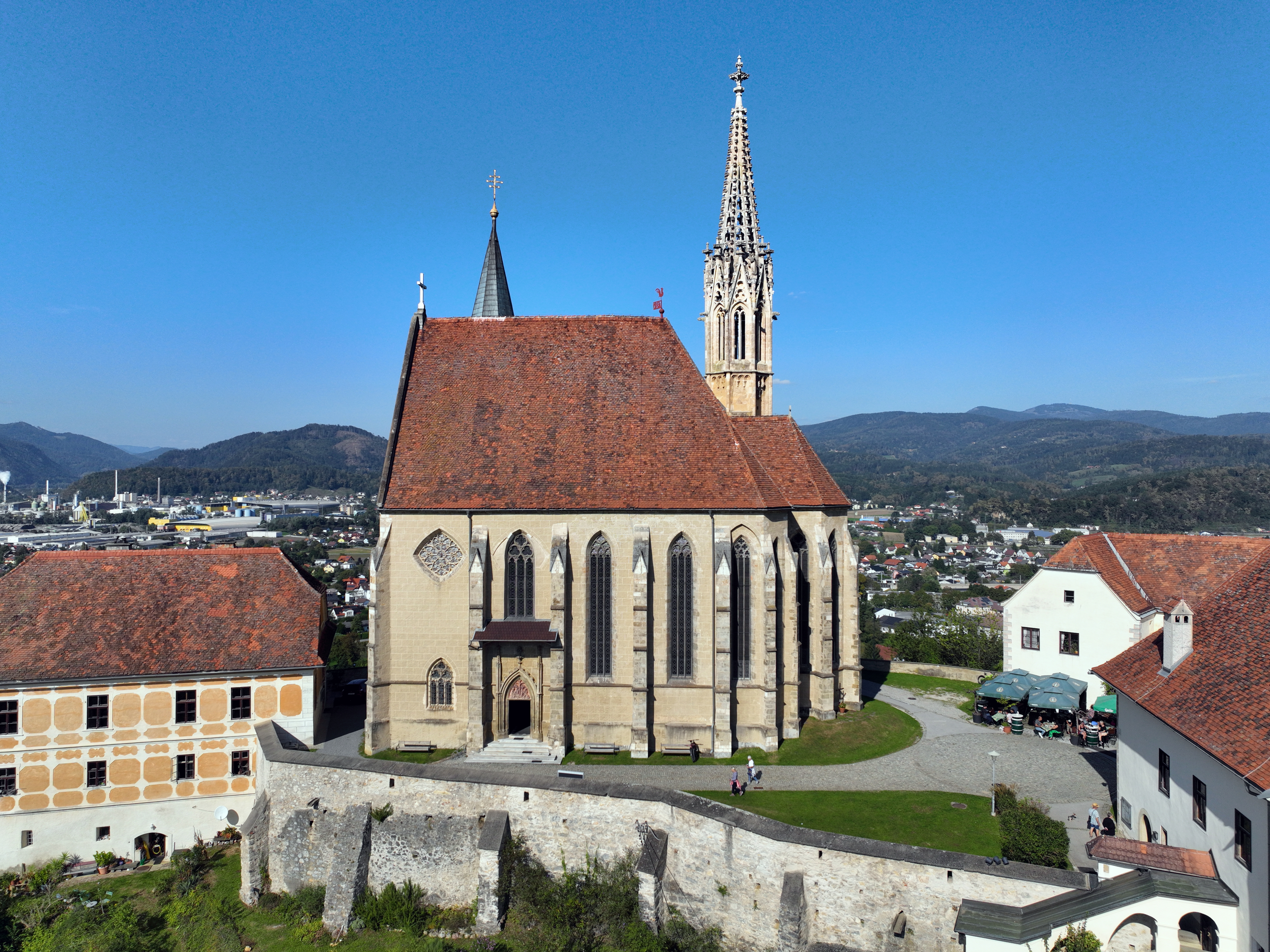
South view of the church

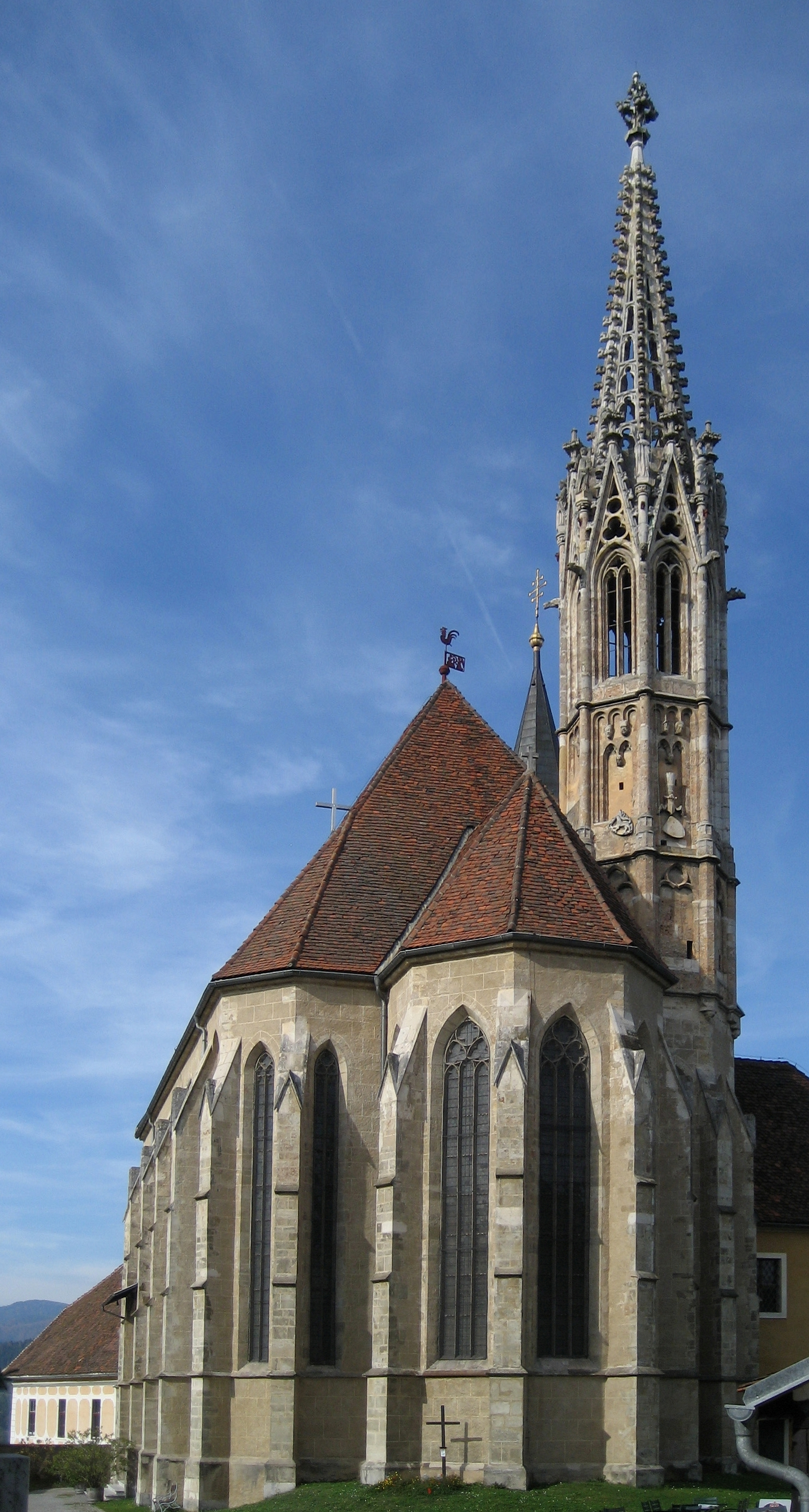
Church exterior

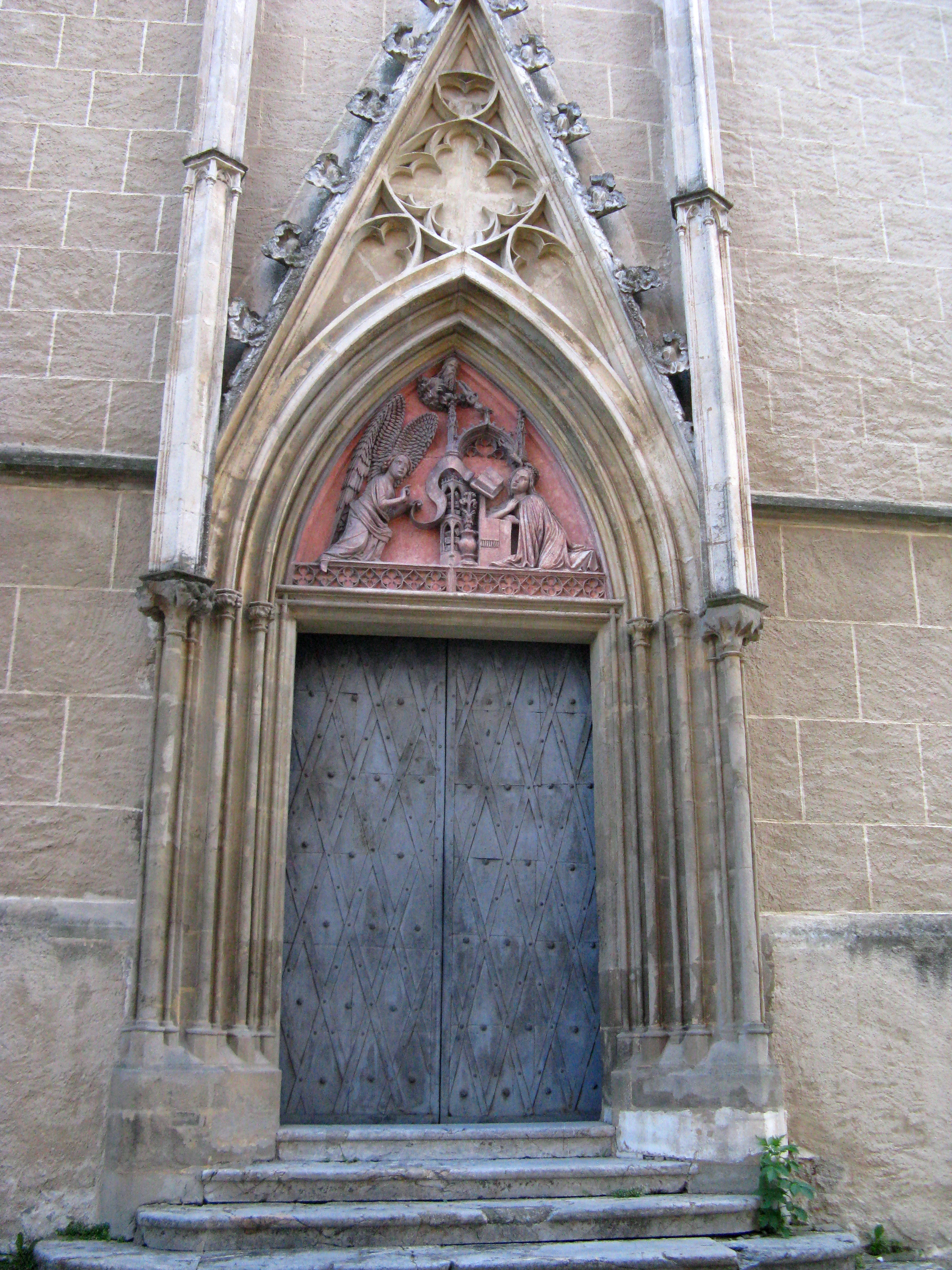
West portal

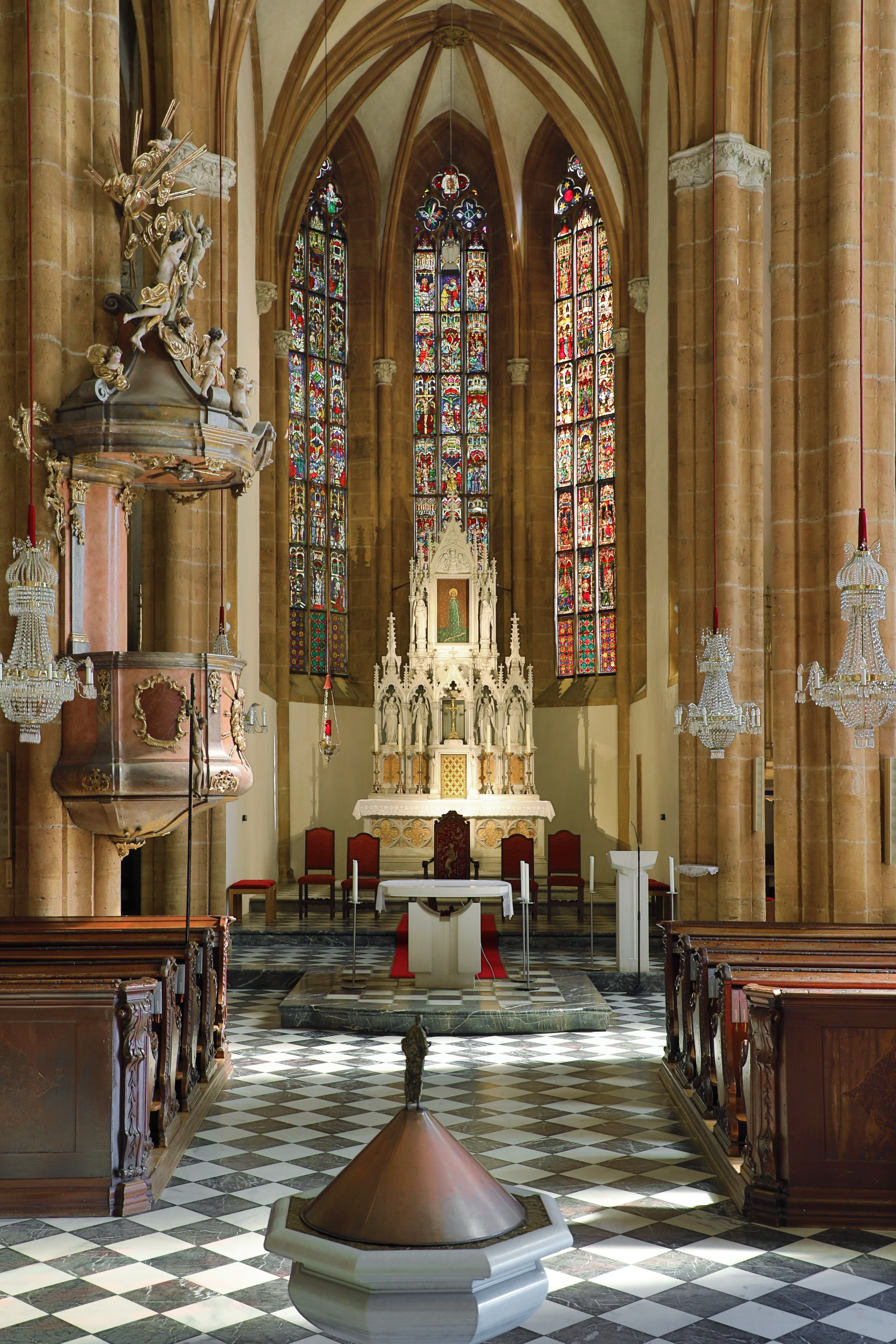
Church interior
