= Gratwein-Straßengel =

- Municipality
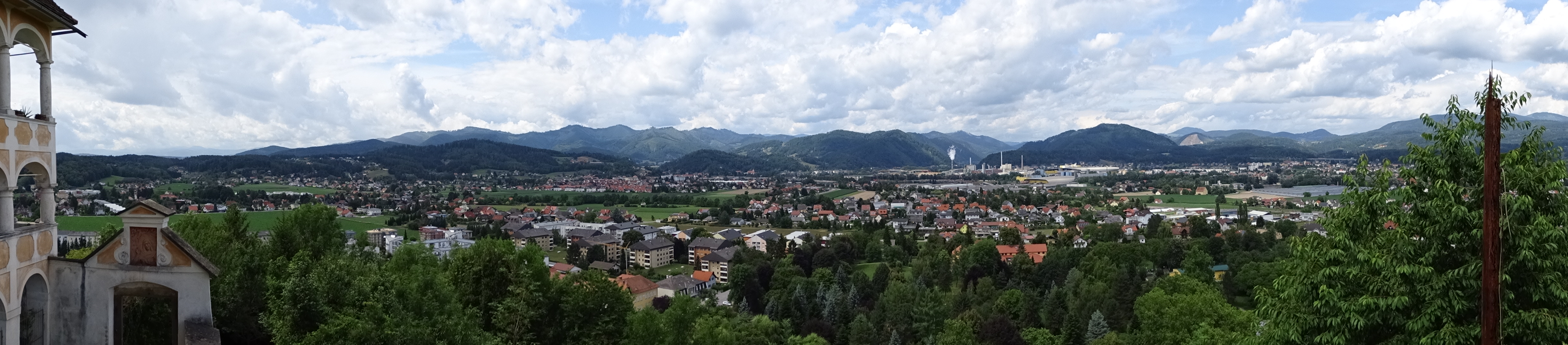

- Coat of arms

- Location within Austria
- Coordinates: 47°06′46″N 15°20′04″E
- Country: Austria
- State: Styria
- District: Graz-Umgebung

Government
  - Mayor: Harald Mulle (SPÖ)

Area
  - Total: 86.62 km^{2} (33.44 sq mi)
- Elevation: 392 m (1,286 ft)

Population (2018-01-01)
  - Total: 13,002
  - Density: 150.1/km^{2} (388.8/sq mi)
- Time zone: UTC+1 (CET)
  - Summer (DST): UTC+2 (CEST)
- Postal code: 8103, 8111, 8112, 8113, 8114, 8153
- Area code: 03124
- Website: www.gratwein-strassengel.gv.at

Since 2015 Gratwein-Straßengel (German: [ɡʁatˈvaɪn ʃ͡tʁasˈɛŋgl̩]) is a market town in the Graz-Umgebung District of Styria, Austria. The town took effect as part of the Styria municipal structural reform, from the end of 2014 with the merging of the former municipalities Gratwein, Judendorf-Straßengel, Eisbach and Gschnaidt. The merger made the market town population to be the 6th-largest in Styria.

A petition by the mayor of Eisbach, to the constitutional court, against the merger was not successful. Likewise a petition from the town Gschnaidt was not successful.

== Geography ==
=== Municipality layout ===
The town lies to the west (right) bank of the Mur River, about 10 kilometres (6.2 mi) northwest of the Styrian capital Graz.

The section Rein, with its famous Stift, is the seat of a Bundesgymnasium.

=== Municipality arrangement ===
The town contains 11 sections with a total of 12,803 residents (as of 1 January 2016):

- Eisbach (1,010)
- Gratwein (3,635)
- Gschnaidt (327)
- Hörgas (990)
- Hundsdorf (485)
- Judendorf (1,550)
- Kehr und Plesch (101)
- Kugelberg (292)
- Rein (890)
- Rötz (785)
- Straßengel (2,741)

The municipal area is divided into six Katastralgemeinden (areas 2015):

- Eisbach (1,621.05 ha)
- Gratwein (457.05 ha)
- Gschnaidt (2,995.61 ha)
- Hörgas (1,297.71 ha)
- Judendorf-Straßengel (1,064.05 ha)
- Kehr und Plesch (1,232.45 ha)

=== Geology ===
The area lies in the Gratkorn Basin, which opens to the West Styria region and forms an expanded part of the Mur valley.

== Surveys ==
In the communal area, there are some related peaks within the Grazer Bergland, including the "four Thousander", along which form a popular trail in the area of Stift Rein.

- Heiggerkogel (1,098 m)
- Pleschkogel (1,061 m)
- Mühlbacher Kogel (1,050 m)
- Walzkogel (1026 m)
- Generalkogel (713 m)
- Gsollerkogel (667 m)
- Kugelberg (564 m)

== History ==
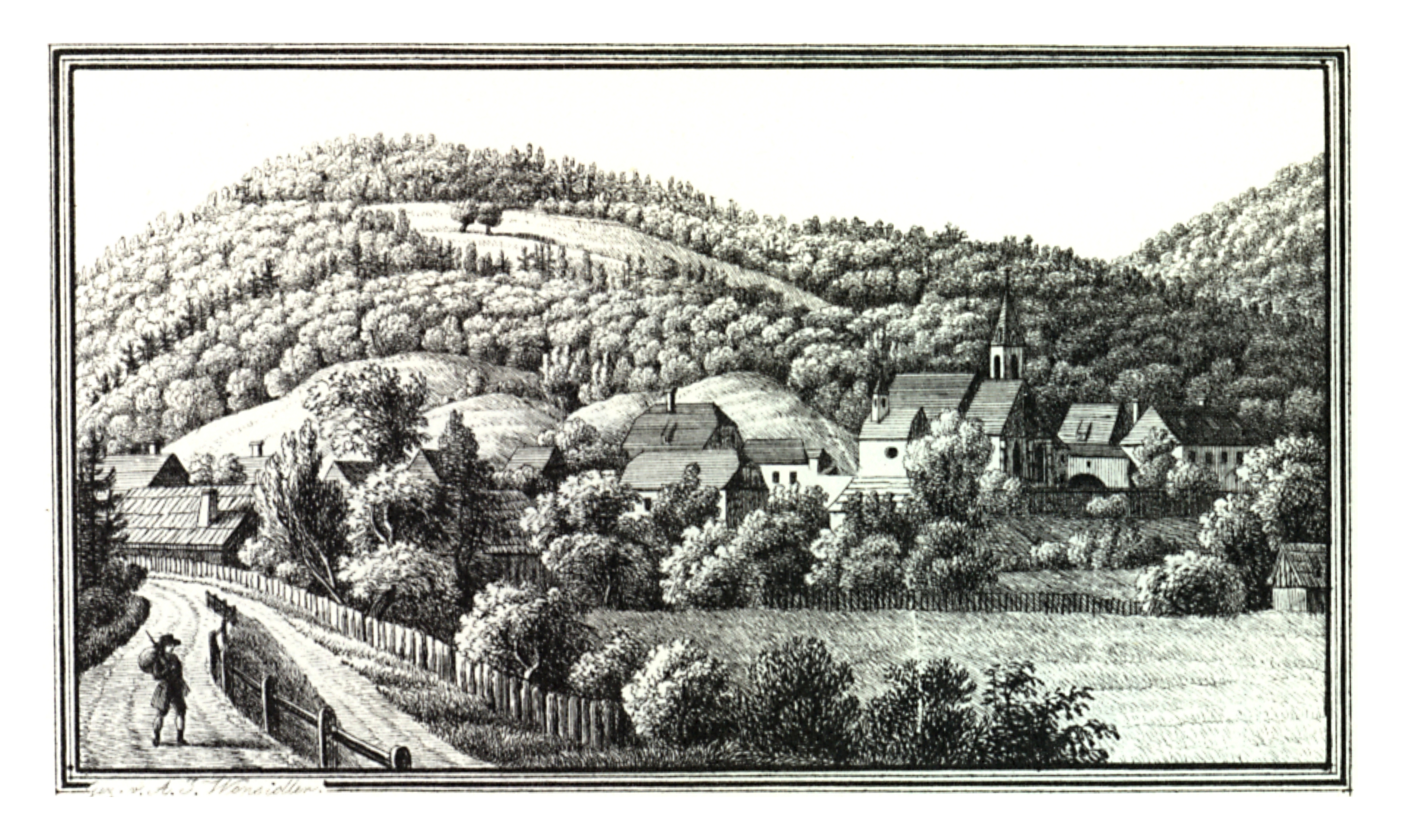
Gratwein circa 1830, Lith. Anstalt J.F. Kaiser, Graz.

The local communities as autonomous entities came into existence after the abolition of the landlords in 1850.

Judendorf Straßengel

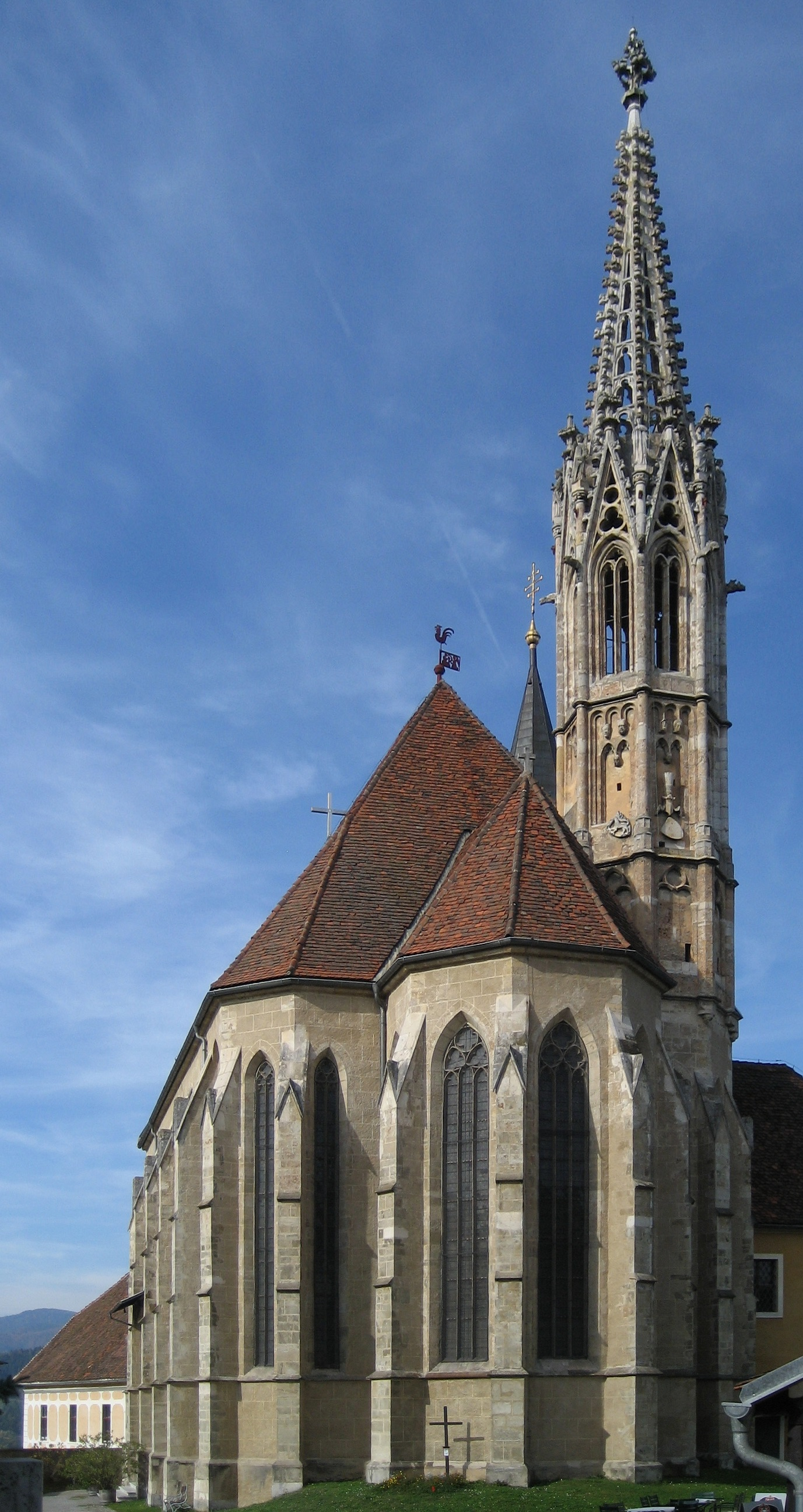
Wallfahrtskirche church Maria Straßengel.

Around 860, in one of the oldest documents of Austria, the church hill of Straßengel is called ad Strazinolun. Probably the name derives from Slavic straza, which could refer to a watchtower located here.

On June 11, 1147, Margrave Otakar III dedicated the monastery Rein to several towns Rotz, Straßengel and Judendorf. These areas were managed by monks from Rein Abbey.

Settlements named Judendorf are usually located along old trade routes crossing the Alps. In their neighborhood, the city and market foundations were established later. It is assumed that these Jewish villages are the settlements of Jewish merchants who were intensively involved in the merchandise trade in the early Middle Ages.

After the abolition of the landlords, Judendorf, Straßengel, Rötz, Hundsdorf, and Kugelberg were included in the market town of Gratwein, established in 1849.

With the opening of the Mürzzuschlag–Graz section of the k.k. privileged Southern Railway on October 21, 1844, the Gratwein/Gratkorn Basin also joined the Industrial Revolution. As a result, Jewish businesses settled in Judendorf, including a cement factory.

The people of Judendorf and Straßengel, however, owed their economic boom to the fact that the upper class of Graz had seized this area already in the year 1850. Especially based on economic activity was the development of a hotel (1889), a cold-water sanatorium (1894), and the "Styrian Park Sanatorium Dr. Feiler" (1901). At the time, as one of the most famous spa resorts of the monarchy, Judendorf-Straßengel finally obtained the separation from Gratwein, and in 1909 constituted itself as an independent local community.

The upswing came to an abrupt end with the collapse of the monarchy and the associated loss of the economic backlands. The congregation would soon have sunk into insignificance, if the health insurance of the Austrian federal railway would not have taken over the former Feiler Park Sanatorium.

After the Second World War, Judendorf-Straßengel developed more and more into a residential community, and in 1981, 86% of the workforce worked in the home-community. After the insurance company of Austria railways in 1989 abolished parts of its special hospital. Through intensive efforts, the tradition of Judendorf-Straßengel as a health resort and as a place of rest and recreation also continued. Consequently, in the first special department of the Psychiatric Hospital "Park Residence", a retirement home, and on the site of the last disused part, a modern rehabilitation center was built with a focus on neurology, orthopedics, oncology and children's rehabilitation.

In 2009 the main square was completely redesigned around the former community center and inaugurated on the occasion of the 100th anniversary.

Eisbach

North of the village Rein was in the Neolithic Age (Neolithic) in Lasinja-Culture, a mining site for silex (siliceous rock as chert, quartz, etc.). From there, tools (hand axes, blades, scrapers, etc.) were won. Workpieces of this mining site were spread to a distance of 150 km (93 mi) away.

Since the 12th century, the Stift Rein has been a characteristic feature of the community. In Eisbach and in its surroundings, there were a number of mining operations, as for mercury and lignite.

== Culture and sights ==
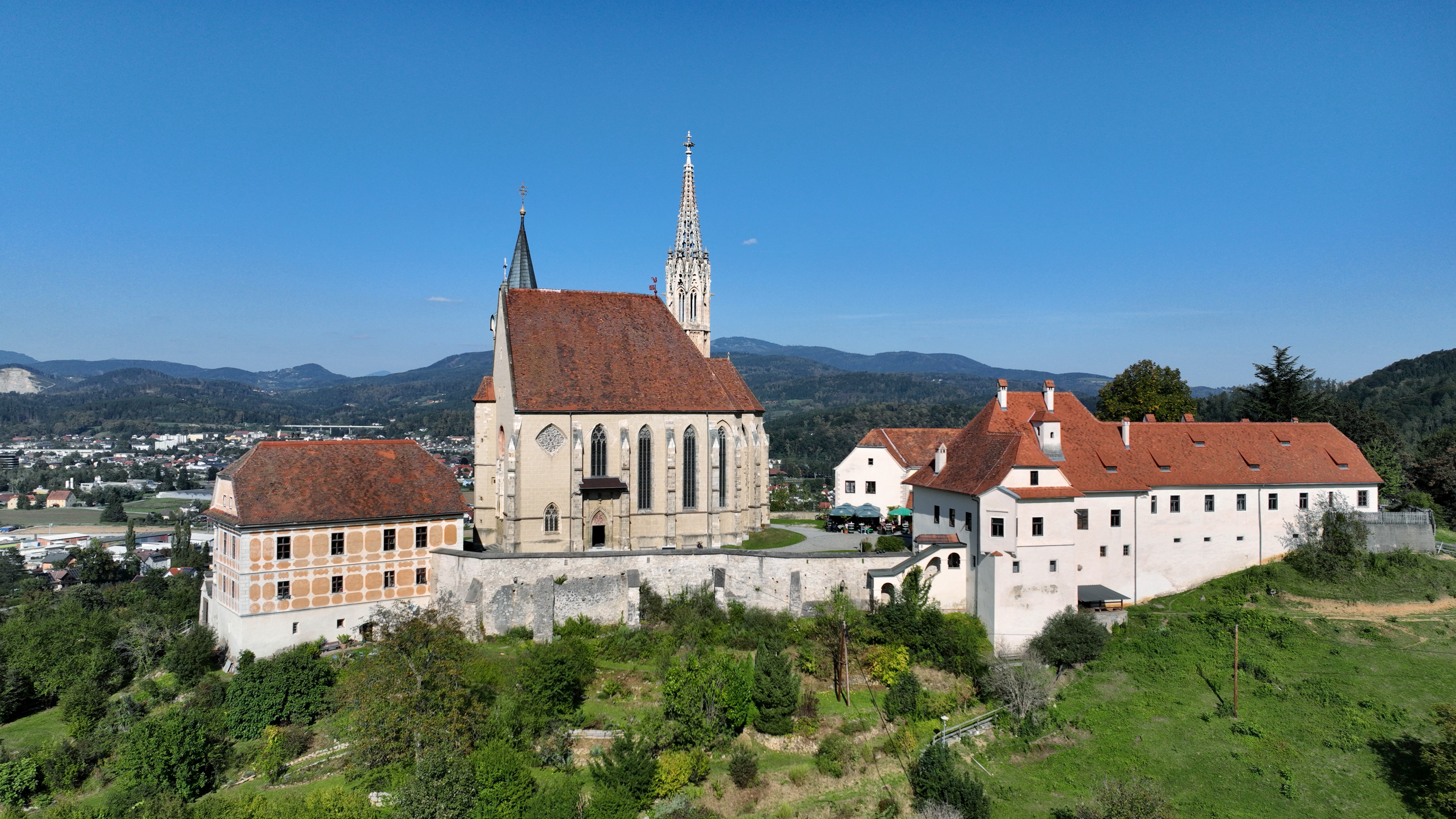
The Maria Straßengel church, view from southwest

=== Buildings ===
- Pfarrkirche Parish church of St. Rupert church (Gratwein)
- The Sanctuary of Maria Straßengel was built in the 14th century and is one of the most important sacred buildings of the high Gothic in Austria. Particularly noteworthy is the filigree tower construction, which recalls those of the Freiburg Minster.
- The former cement kiln of Judendorf-Straßengel is an industrial monument.
- Stift Rein, today the oldest existing Cistercian monastery in the world in Rein
- Kleines Farm Little farm museum Eisbach-Rein
- Nostalgie-Rüsthaus Old fire brigade building Eisbach

=== Sports ===
- EC Ruffnecks Gratwein (ice hockey), founded in 2003, plays in the Styrian league
- GSV RB Gratwein (football)

== Economy and infrastructure ==
=== Transportation ===
The proximity to the town of Graz is very well connected. It is not located directly on one of the main roads, but on the regional road from Gratkorn to Eisbach. Through this connection, the Grazerstraße B 67 achieve. The nearest interchanges to the Pyhrn motorway A 9 are Deutschfeistritz (exit 165) at about 8 kilometres (5.0 mi) northbound and Gratkorn (exit 173) six km southbound.

In the municipality area lies the Bahnhof Gratwein-Gratkorn and the stop Judendorf-Straßengel of the Austrian Southern Railway, with half-hourly to hourly train connections (S1) to Graz and Bruck an der Mur.

The Graz Airport is about 28 km (17 mi) away.

== Politics ==
=== Municipal council ===
The municipal council consists of 31 members and is composed from the following parties since the 2020 municipal elections:

- 15 SPÖ
- 6 ÖVP
- 4 FPÖ
- 4 GRÜNE
- 2 Unser Gratwein-Straßengel.

=== Mayor ===
The mayor is Doris Dirnberger (SPÖ).

=== Coat of arms ===
Crests of former towns

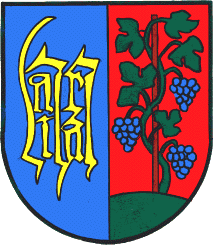
Gratwein

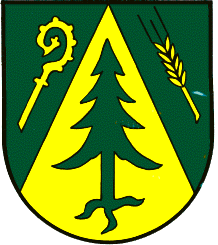
Eisbach

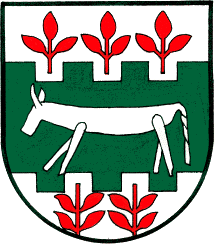
Gschnaidt

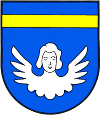
Judendorf-Straßengel

All four predecessor towns had a town crest. Because of the merger, they lost their official validity on January 1, 2015. The new municipal coat of arms for the merged community took effect on 15 October 2016.

Blazon (crest description):

"A silver cross of blue and green shield; at top, a golden cherub head; at right, a silver leafy wine branch; at left a silver 5-part leafed beech branch, and underneath is the golden curvature of an abbey."

The crosier point points to the old, important Rein Cistercian monastery.

=== Twin cities ===
- of the former town of Eisbach
  - Germany Ebrach (Bavaria), since 1979
- of the former town of Judendorf-Straßengel
  - Hungary Komárom (Hungary)

== Notable residents ==
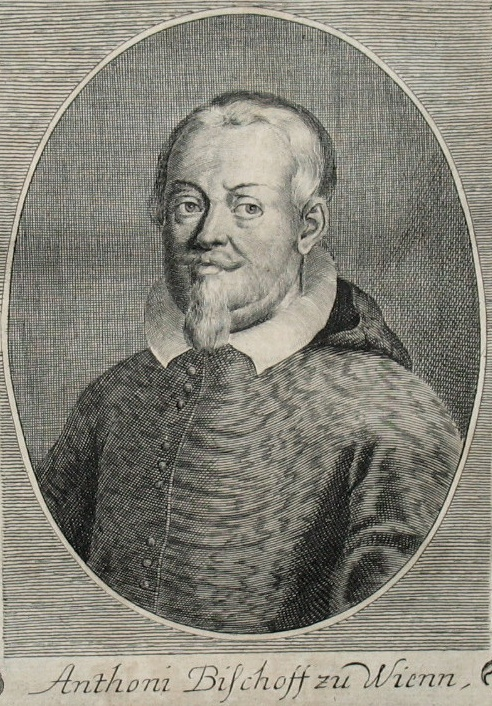
Anton Wolfradt in 1631

- Anton Wolfradt (1582–1639), Hofkammer president, Cistercian, abbot of Kremsmunster and Catholic Bishop of Vienna, was from 1609 to 1612 pastor of Gratwein
- Gottfried Prabitz (1926–2015), Austrian sculptor
- Othmar Krenn (1952–1998), Austrian artist, creator of "art train", born in Gratwein
- Gundis Zámbó (born 1966), German actress and television presenter, born in Gratwein
- Clemens Maria Schreiner (born 1989), Austrian cabaret artist, lives in Gratwein
- Christian Scherübl (born 1994), Austrian swimmer, junior European champion, born in Gratwein
- Amalija Knavs (1945-2024), mother of Melania Trump, former First Lady of the United States

== Sources ==
- Ingo Mirsch: Marktgemeinde Judendorf-Straßengel - Die Geschichte, about the market town, erhältlich im Gemeindeamt.
- Ingo Mirsch: Judendorf in alten Ansichten, Herausgeber: European Bibliothek, ISBN 90-288-1346-2.
- Marianne Gerstenberger: Maria Straßengel, Herausgeber: Pfarramt.
