= Víctor de la Parte =

Spanish cyclist

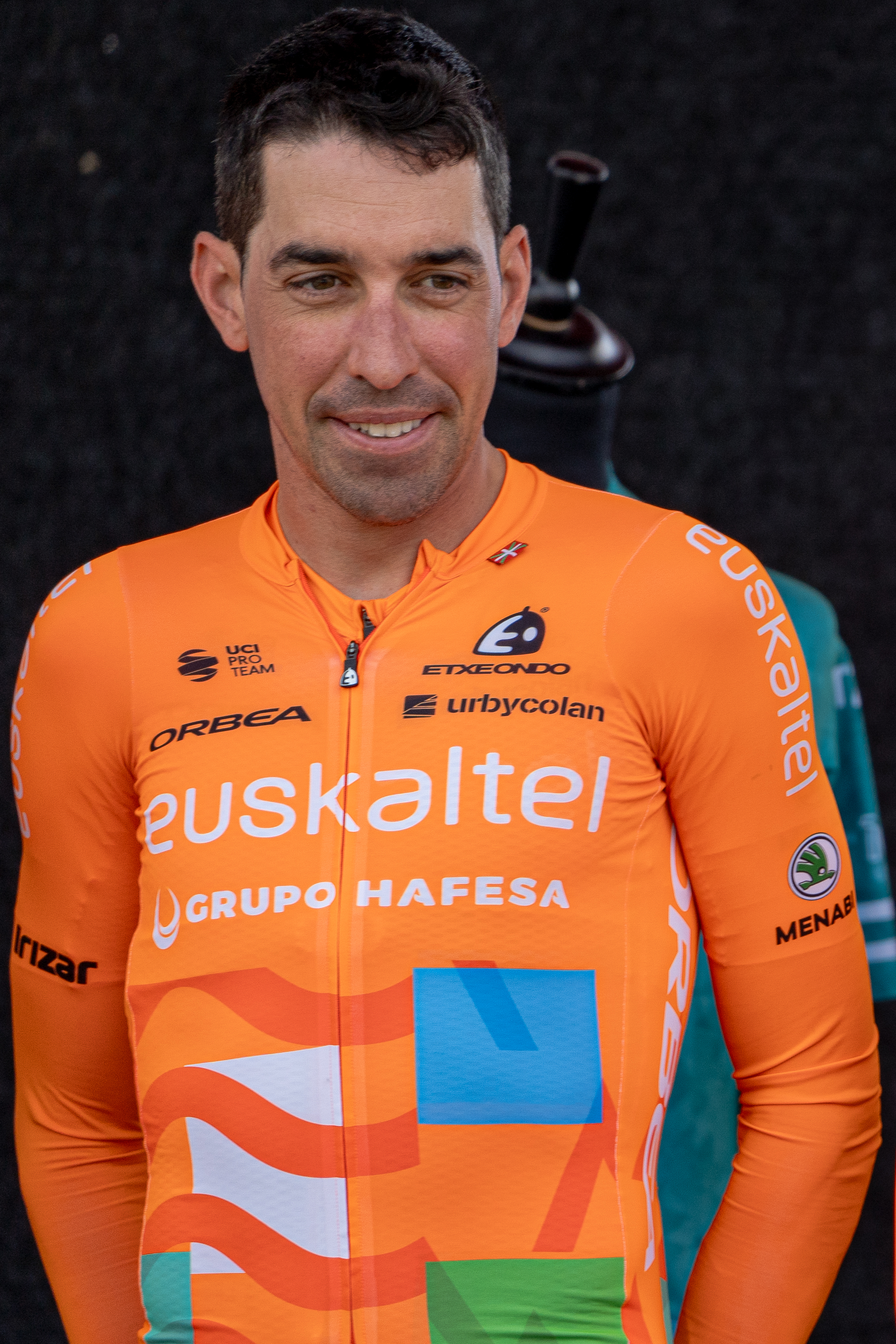
- De la Parte in 2024

Personal information
- Full name: Víctor de la Parte González
- Born: 22 June 1986 (age 40) Vitoria-Gasteiz, Spain
- Height: 1.81 m (5 ft 11 in)
- Weight: 66 kg (146 lb)

Cycling career
- Sport: Cycling
- Current team: Retired
- Discipline: Road
- Role: Rider

Professional teams
- 2011: Caja Rural
- 2012–2013: SP Tableware
- 2014: Efapel–Glassdrive
- 2015: Team Vorarlberg
- 2016: CCC–Sprandi–Polkowice
- 2017–2018: Movistar Team
- 2019–2020: CCC Team
- 2021–2023: Total Direct Énergie
- 2024–2025: Euskaltel–Euskadi

Major wins
- Stage races Tour of Austria (2015)

Víctor de la Parte González (born 22 June 1986) is a Spanish former cyclist, who competed as a professional from 2011 to March 2025. During his career, he competed six Grand Tours and won the 2015 Tour of Austria.

== Major results ==
2009
10th Overall Vuelta a Extremadura
2010
1st Stage 8 Circuito Montañés
2012
1st Overall Sibiu Cycling Tour

1st Points classification
1st Mountains classification
1st Stage 1

2nd Overall Tour of Romania

1st Stage 8

5th Overall Tour of Hainan
8th Overall Tour of Szeklerland
2013
1st Overall Tour d'Algérie

1st Stage 5

3rd Overall Tour de Blida
4th Overall Tour of Bulgaria
5th Overall Sibiu Cycling Tour
6th Mayor Cup
2014
2nd Overall Troféu Joaquim Agostinho

1st Prologue

7th Overall Volta a Portugal

1st Prologue

2015
1st Overall Tour of Austria

1st Stages 4 & 6

1st Overall Flèche du Sud
3rd Overall Oberösterreich Rundfahrt

1st Stage 1

5th Overall Tour de Taiwan
5th Raiffeisen Grand Prix
7th Tour de Berne
8th Race Horizon Park Maidan
8th Coupe des Carpathes
9th Race Horizon Park Classic
2016
3rd Overall Tour of Croatia
6th Overall Czech Cycling Tour
10th Vuelta a Murcia
2019
3rd Overall CRO Race
10th Overall Tour of Austria
2020
10th Overall UAE Tour
2021
4th Overall Vuelta a Asturias

=== Grand Tour general classification results timeline ===
Grand Tour	2017	2018	2019	2020	2021
Giro d'Italia	56	39	21	34	—
Tour de France	—	—	—	—	72
Vuelta a España	—	—	DNF	—	—

Legend
—	Did not compete
DNF	Did not finish
