= Dayer Quintana =

Colombian cyclist

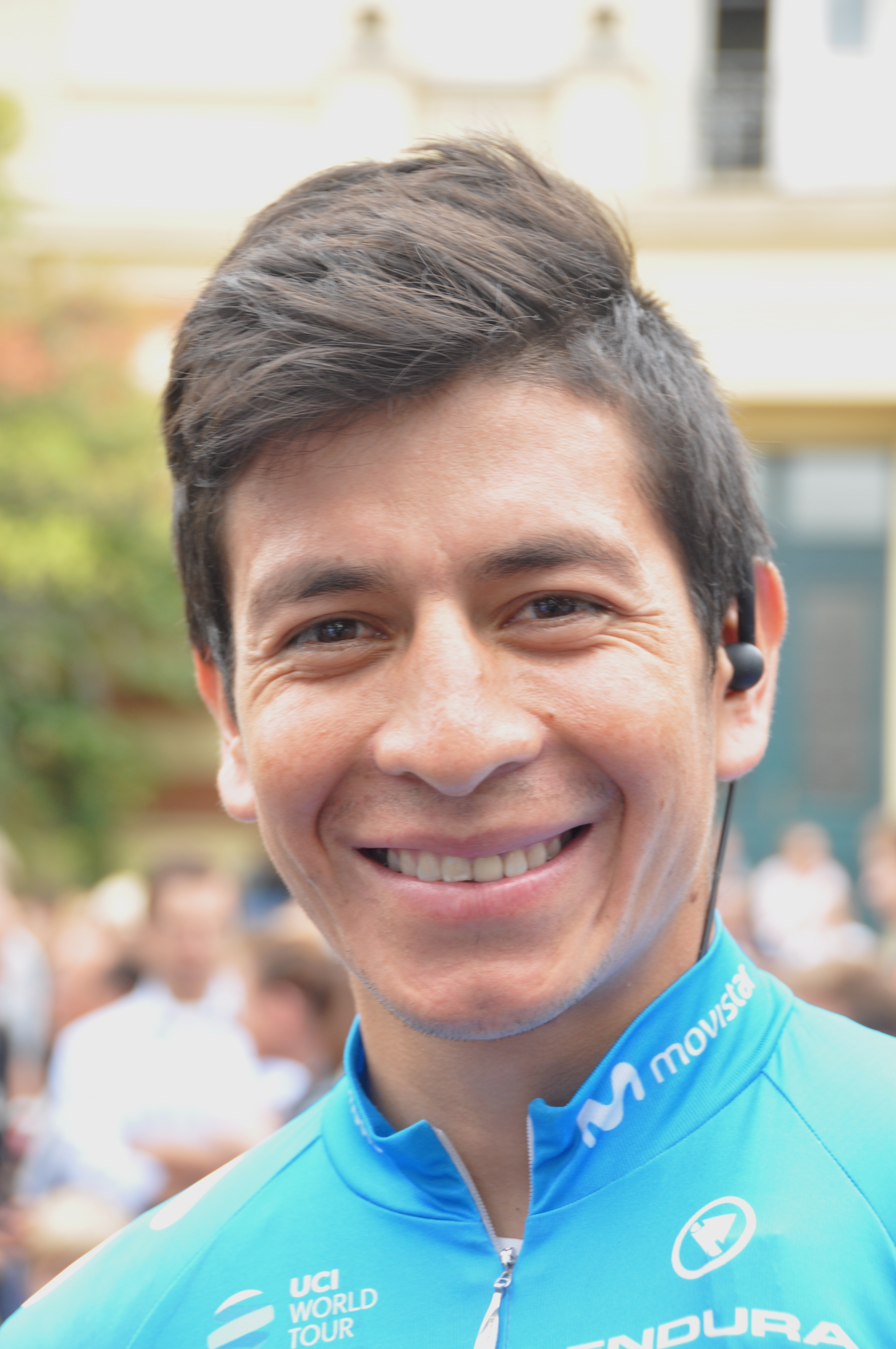
- Quintana in 2018.

Personal information
- Full name: Dayer Uberney Quintana Rojas
- Born: 10 August 1992 (age 34) Cómbita, Boyacá, Colombia
- Height: 1.67 m (5 ft 6 in)
- Weight: 58 kg (128 lb)

Cycling career
- Sport: Cycling
- Current team: Arkéa–B&B Hotels
- Discipline: Road
- Role: Rider
- Rider type: Climber

Amateur teams
- 2010: Boyacá es Para Vivirla
- 2012: Alcaldía de Tunja
- 2013: Lizarte

Professional teams
- 2014–2018: Movistar Team
- 2019: Neri Sottoli–Selle Italia–KTM
- 2020–: Arkéa–Samsic

Major wins
- Stage races Tour de San Luis (2016)

Dayer Uberney Quintana Rojas (born 10 August 1992 in Cómbita) is a Colombian cyclist who currently rides for UCI ProTeam Arkéa–B&B Hotels. He is the younger brother of fellow professional cyclist Nairo Quintana, who also rides for the Arkéa–Samsic team. His first professional victory was stage 3 of the 2014 Tour of Austria. In August 2020, he was named in the startlist for the 2020 Tour de France.

== Major results ==
2013
2nd Clásica Santiago en Cos
2014
5th Prueba Villafranca de Ordizia
9th Overall Tour of Austria

1st Stage 3

10th Dutch Food Valley Classic
2016
1st Overall Tour de San Luis
2018
1st Stage 6 Colombia Oro y Paz
8th Overall Vuelta a San Juan
2019
6th Overall Adriatica Ionica Race
7th Overall Giro di Sicilia

=== Grand Tour general classification results timeline ===
Grand Tour	2015	2016	2017	2018	2019	2020
Giro d'Italia	93	—	—	82	—	—
Tour de France	—	—	—	—	—	95
Vuelta a España	Has not contested during his career.					

Legend
—	Did not compete
DNF	Did not finish
