= Gundis Zámbó =

German actress

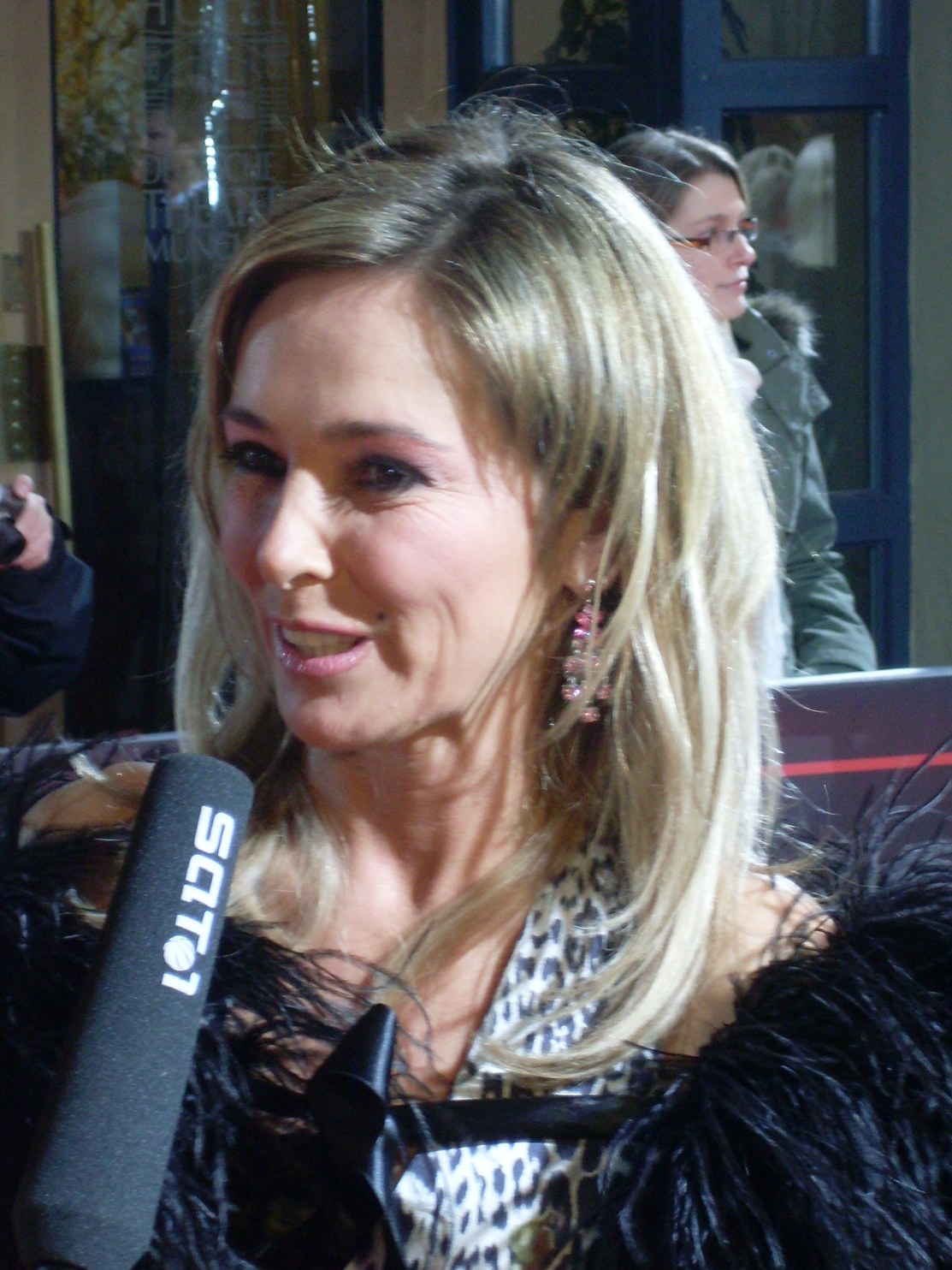
- Gundis Zambo in 2008.
- Born: 5 June 1966 (age 59); Gratwein, Styria, Austria
- Website: http://www.gundis-zambo.de/

Gundis Zámbó (born 5 June 1966 in Gratwein, Styria) is a German actress with Austrian and Hungarian origin.
