= Eisbach, Styria =

Eisbach
- Former municipality
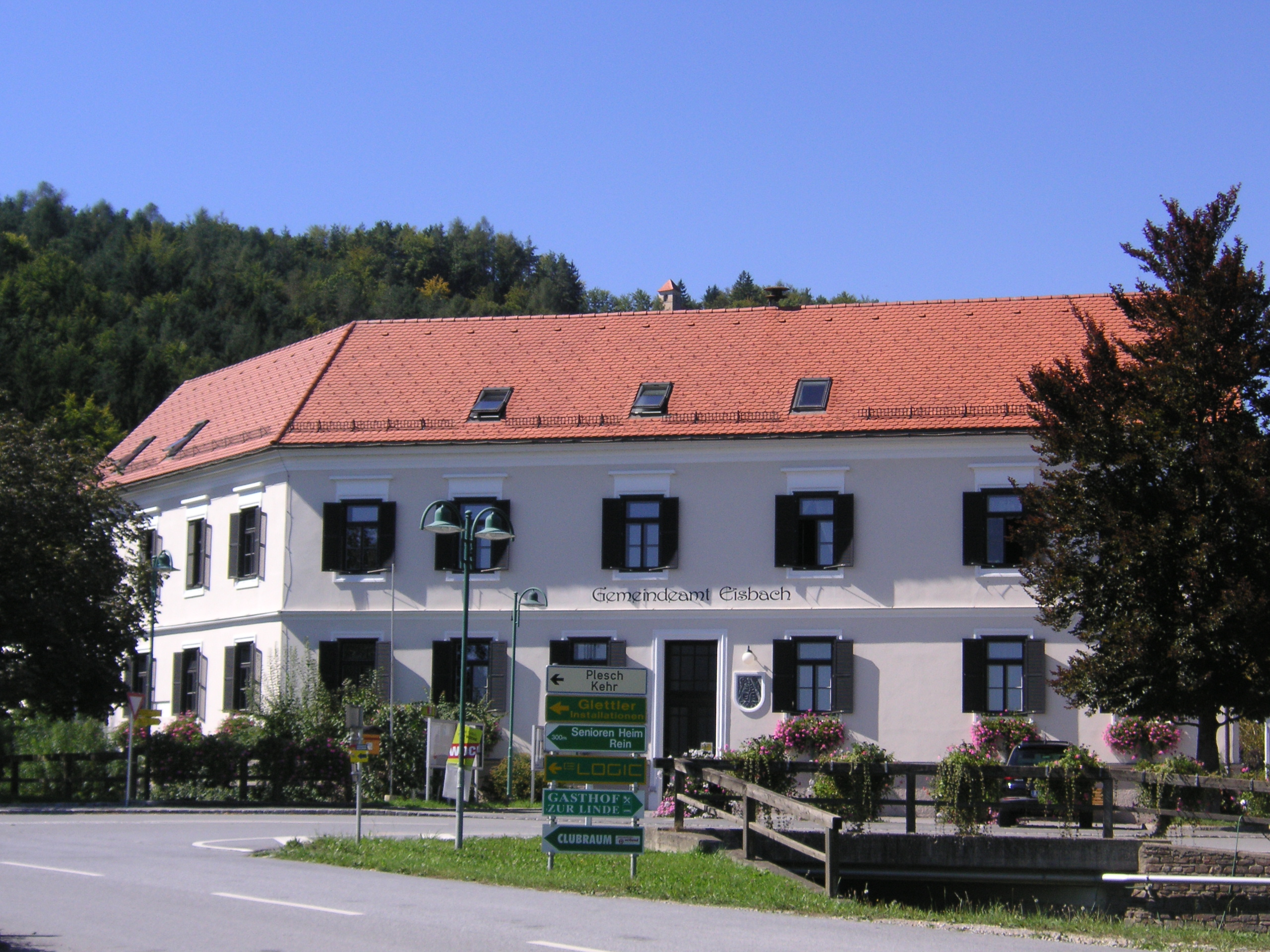
- Eisbach town hall

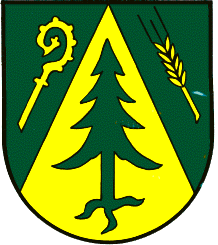
- Coat of arms

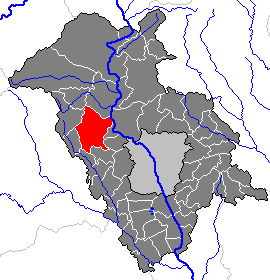
- Location within Graz-Umgebung district

- Location within Austria
- Coordinates: 47°8′13″N 15°17′7″E
- Country: Austria
- State: Styria
- District: Graz-Umgebung

Area
  - Total: 41.45 km^{2} (16.00 sq mi)
- Elevation: 453 m (1,486 ft)

Population (1 January 2016)
  - Total: 2,955
  - Density: 71.29/km^{2} (184.6/sq mi)
- Time zone: UTC+1 (CET)
  - Summer (DST): UTC+2 (CEST)
- Postal code: 8103, 8112
- Area code: 03124
- Vehicle registration: GU
- Website: www.eisbach-rein.at

Eisbach (German pronunciation: [ˈaɪsbax]) is a former municipality in the district of Graz-Umgebung in the Austrian state of Styria. Since the 2015 Styria municipal structural reform, it is part of the municipality Gratwein-Straßengel.

== Population ==
Historical population
Year	Pop.	±%
1869	1,594	—
1880	1,572	−1.4%
1890	1,711	+8.8%
1900	1,597	−6.7%
1910	1,840	+15.2%
1923	2,267	+23.2%
1934	1,967	−13.2%
1939	1,935	−1.6%
1951	2,328	+20.3%
1961	2,405	+3.3%
1971	2,568	+6.8%
1981	2,547	−0.8%
1991	2,818	+10.6%
2001	2,893	+2.7%
