= Judendorf-Straßengel =

- Former municipality
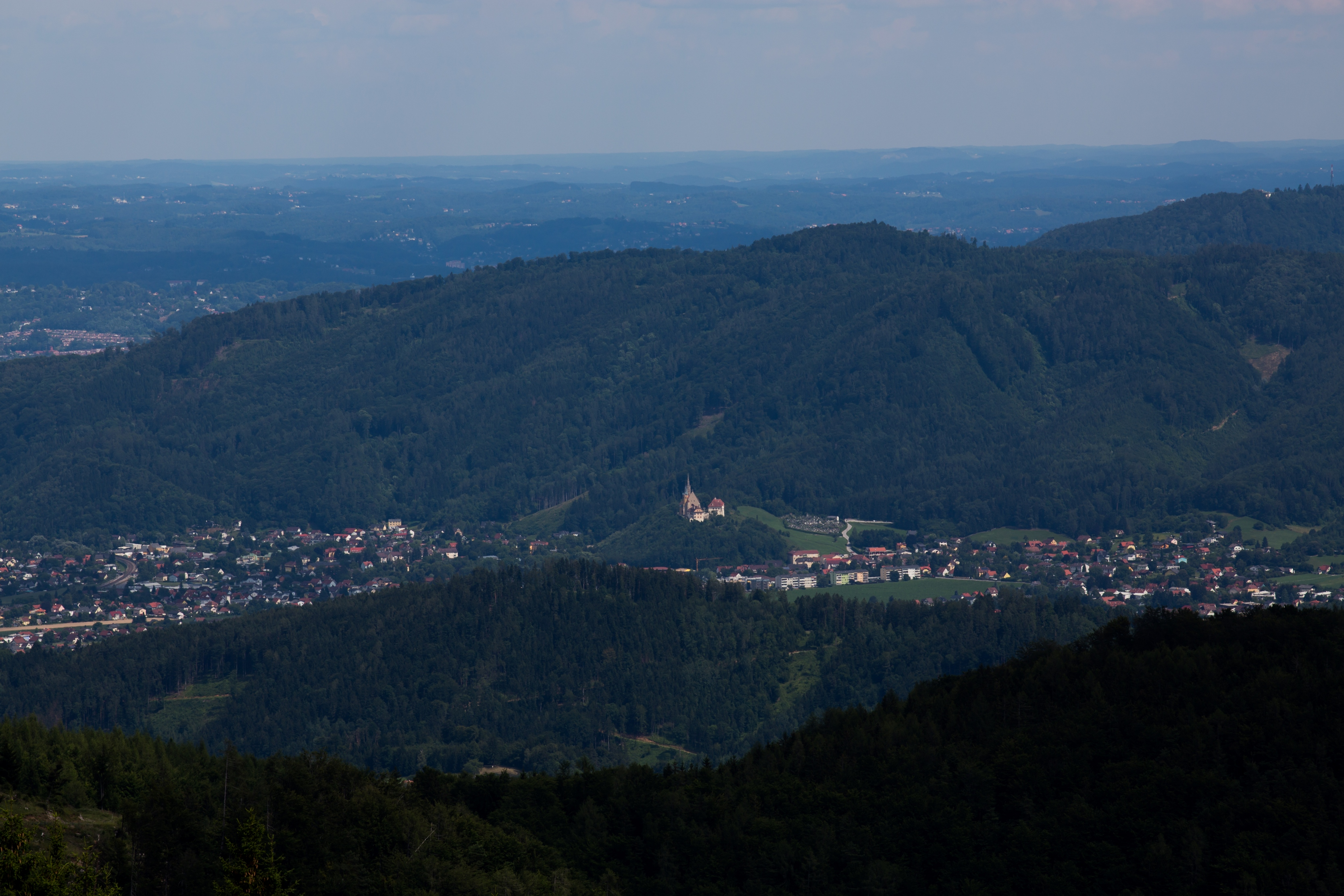

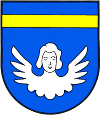
- Coat of arms

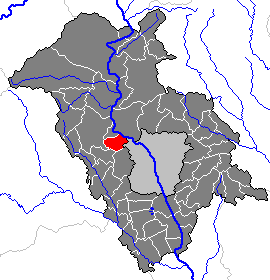
- Location within Graz-Umgebung district

- Location within Austria
- Coordinates: 47°06′46″N 15°20′04″E
- Country: Austria
- State: Styria
- District: Graz-Umgebung

Area
  - Total: 10.61 km^{2} (4.10 sq mi)
- Elevation: 380 m (1,250 ft)

Population (1 January 2016)
  - Total: 5,851
  - Density: 551.5/km^{2} (1,428/sq mi)
- Time zone: UTC+1 (CET)
  - Summer (DST): UTC+2 (CEST)
- Postal code: 8111
- Area code: 03124
- Vehicle registration: GU
- Website: www.gemeinde-judendorf-strassengel.at

Judendorf-Straßengel (German: [ˈjuːdn̩ˌdɔɐ̯f ʃ͡tʁasˈɛŋgl̩]) is a former municipality in the district of Graz-Umgebung in the Austrian state of Styria. Since the 2015 Styria municipal structural reform, it is part of the municipality Gratwein-Straßengel.

== Geography ==
The town is located a few kilometres north of Graz on the right bank of the Mur river.

== History ==
The town was first mentioned in the year AD 860 as Strazinolum.

== Sights ==
The fourteenth century Gothic Pilgrimage Church Maria Straßengel that stands on a hill overlooking the town was constructed between 1346 and 1355, and contains an important high altar.

== Economy ==
The town also has a rehab clinic, a chemical plant, and a punching tool factory.

== Tourism ==
Straßengel attracts 23,774 overnight stays in tourism. Plankenwarth Castle is located nearby.

== Notable people ==
Notable people that were born or lived in Judendorf-Straßengel include:

- Amalija Knavs (Mother of Melania Trump)
