= Gratwein =

- Former municipality
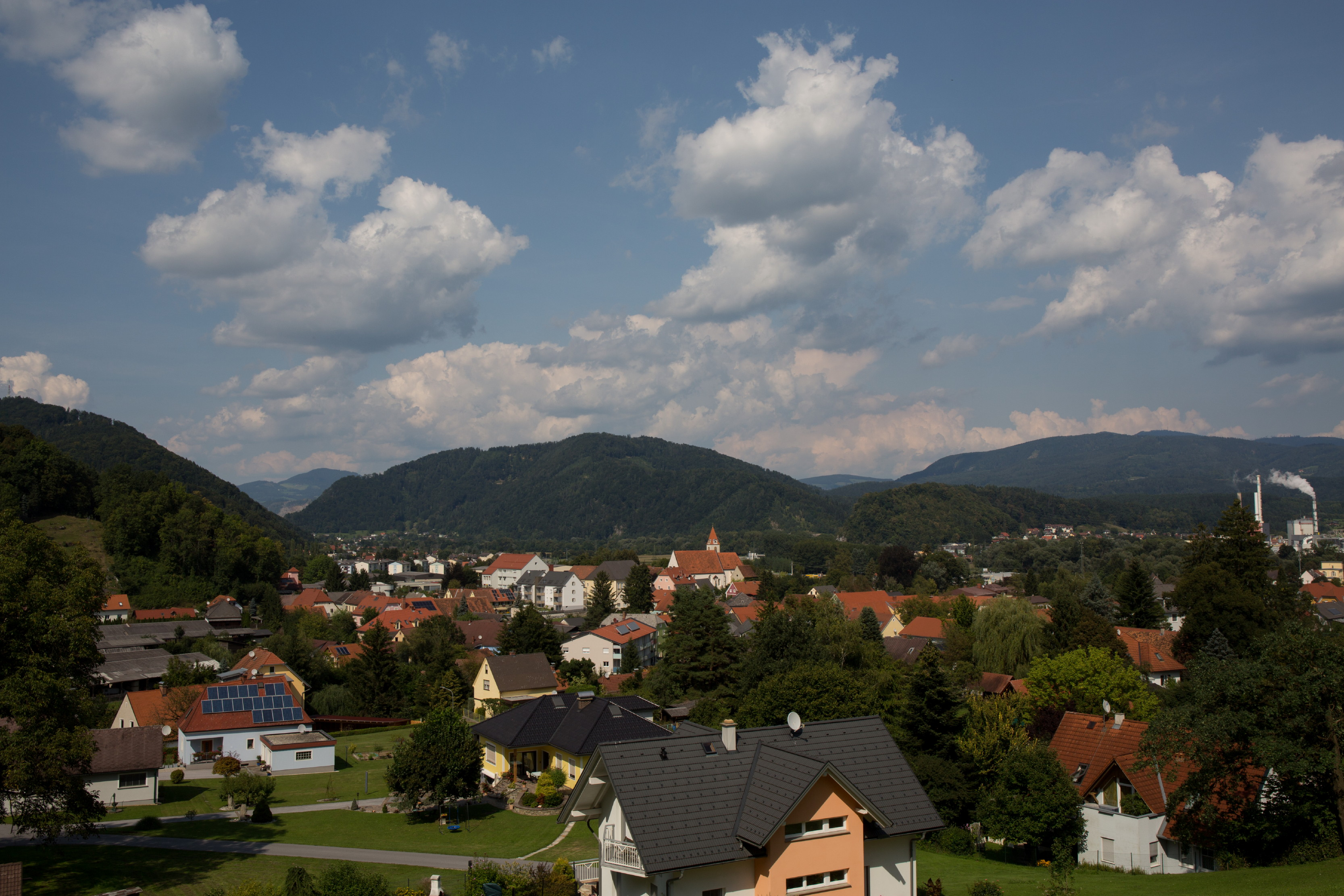

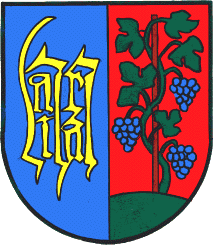
- Coat of arms

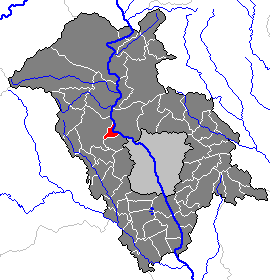
- Location within Graz-Umgebung district

- Location within Austria
- Coordinates: 47°07′46″N 15°19′04″E
- Country: Austria
- State: Styria
- District: Graz-Umgebung

Area
  - Total: 4.55 km^{2} (1.76 sq mi)
- Elevation: 392 m (1,286 ft)

Population (2014-01-01)
  - Total: 3,664
  - Density: 805/km^{2} (2,090/sq mi)
- Time zone: UTC+1 (CET)
  - Summer (DST): UTC+2 (CEST)
- Postal code: 8112
- Area code: 03124
- Vehicle registration: GU
- Website: www.gratwein.at

Gratwein (German: [ɡʁatˈvaɪn]) was a municipality of Austria, merged in 2015 to form Gratwein-Straßengel in the district of Graz-Umgebung in the Austrian state of Styria.

== Population ==
Historical population
Year	Pop.	±%
1869	721	—
1880	793	+10.0%
1890	1,182	+49.1%
1900	1,299	+9.9%
1910	1,499	+15.4%
1923	1,497	−0.1%
1934	1,665	+11.2%
1939	1,754	+5.3%
1951	2,083	+18.8%
1961	2,515	+20.7%
1971	2,758	+9.7%
1981	3,108	+12.7%
1991	3,272	+5.3%
2001	3,525	+7.7%
2014	3,664	+3.9%
