= Krottendorf-Gaisfeld =

- Municipality
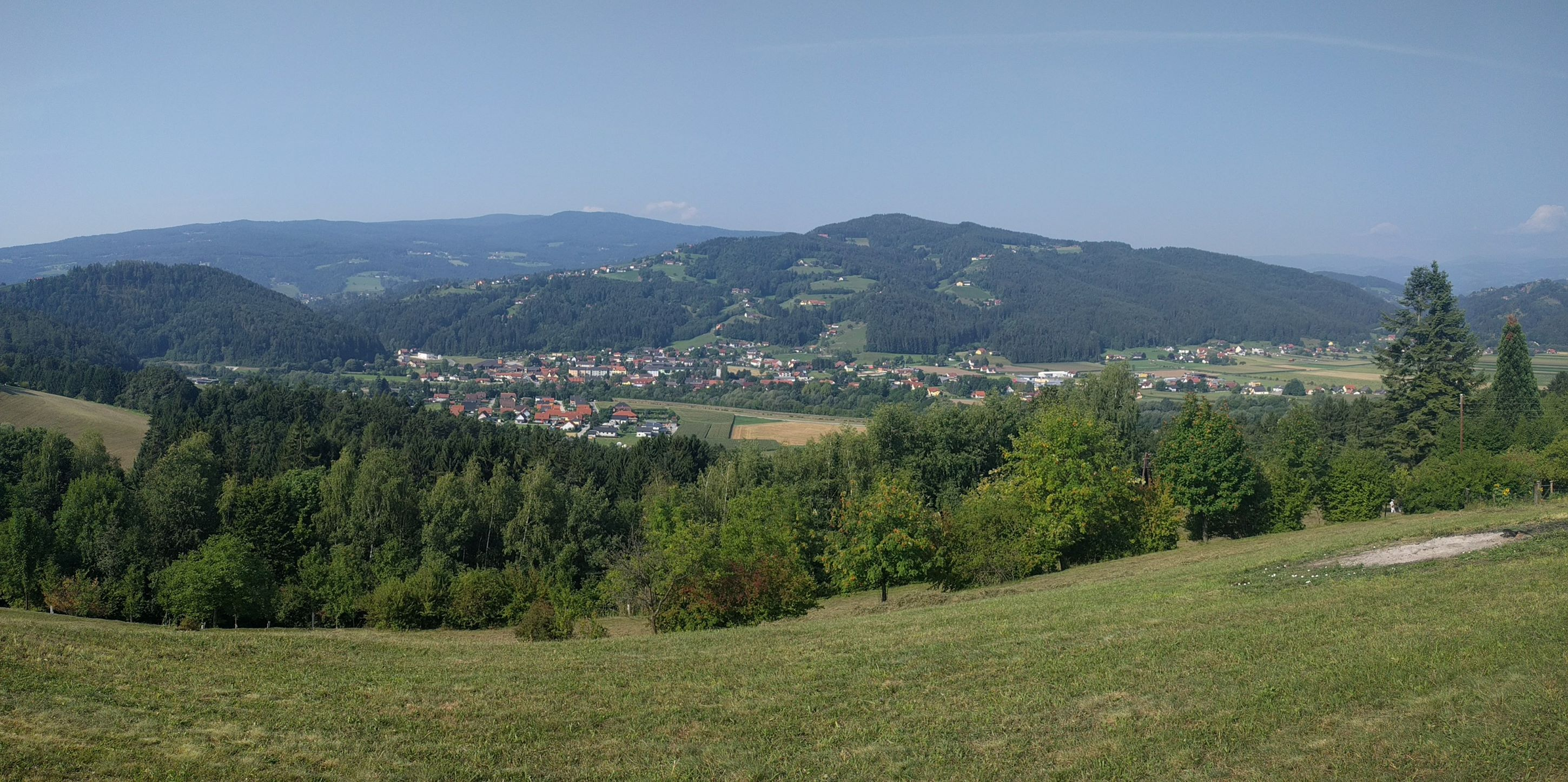
- View of the village of Krottendorf-Gaisfeld (center), Krottendorfberg (center top), and parts of Gaisfeld (right) from Muggauberg.

- Coat of arms

- Location within Austria
- Coordinates: 47°00′33″N 15°12′57″E
- Country: Austria
- State: Styria
- District: Voitsberg

Government
  - Mayor: Johann Feichter (ÖVP)

Area
  - Total: 17.02 km^{2} (6.57 sq mi)

Population (2018-01-01)
  - Total: 2,463
  - Density: 144.7/km^{2} (374.8/sq mi)
- Time zone: UTC+1 (CET)
  - Summer (DST): UTC+2 (CEST)
- Postal code: 8564
- Area code: 03143
- Vehicle registration: VO
- Website: www.krottendorf-gaisfeld.at

Krottendorf-Gaisfeld is a municipality in the district of Voitsberg in the Austrian state of Styria.

== Geography ==
The municipality lies west of Graz.

== Transport ==
Krottendorf-Gaisfeld has two stations, Krottendorf-Ligist and Gaisfeld, on the Köflach railway line, which runs between Graz Hauptbahnhof and Köflach. The Styria S-Bahn stops at both stations.
