= Premstätten =

- Municipality
- Coat of arms

- Location within Austria
- Coordinates: 46°57′53″N 15°24′15″E
- Country: Austria
- State: Styria
- District: Graz-Umgebung

Government
  - Mayor: Matthias Pokorn (ÖVP)

Area
  - Total: 29.07 km^{2} (11.22 sq mi)
- Elevation: 351 m (1,152 ft)

Population (2024)
  - Total: 7,081
  - Density: 243.6/km^{2} (630.9/sq mi)
- Time zone: UTC+1 (CET)
  - Summer (DST): UTC+2 (CEST)
- Postal code: 8054, 8141, 8143, 8144, 8401
- Area code: 03136
- Website: www.unterpremstaetten.at

Premstätten is since January 2016 a new market town with 7,081 residents (as of 2024) in Graz-Umgebung District of Styria, Austria. However, it was previously founded in January 2015 as the town name "Unterpremstätten-Zettling".

The municipality was founded as part of the Styria municipal structural reform, on 31 December 2014, from the dissolved independent municipalities Unterpremstätten and Zettling.

One petition from the municipality Zettling against merging, at the Constitutional Court, was introduced but was unsuccessful.

After a corresponding municipal council, the municipality carries since 2016 the name "Premstätten".

== Geography ==
=== Municipality arrangement ===
The municipal territory includes the following six sections or like-named Katastralgemeinden (areas and populations as of 1 January 2024):

- Bierbaum (916; 245.62 ha or 606.9 acres)
- Hautzendorf (1085; 407.28 ha or 1,006.4 acres)
- Laa (593; 399.75 ha or 987.8 acres)
- Oberpremstätten (1469; 471.63 ha)
- Unterpremstätten (2526; 908.22 ha or 2,244.3 acres)
- Zettling (492; 493.35 ha or 1,219.1 acres)

== Politics ==
=== Mayor ===
The first mayor after the merger, Anton Scherbinek (ÖVP), was elected by the municipal council on 20 April 2015 during the constitutive session. Until then, the Commissioner of the Government, Günter Scherübl had been in charge of official business since 1 January 2015. He was re-elected in 2020 and stayed in office until June 2021. Matthias Pokorn (ÖVP) is mayor since then.

=== Town council ===
The council consists of 25 members, which are made up of the following groups:

- 12 ÖVP
- 7 Liste Ingrid Baumhackl
- 4 SPÖ
- 1 FPÖ
- 1 Die Grünen

The prior elections brought the following results:

Party	2015			2010 ^{1)}		
Party	Stimmen	%	Mandate	St.	%	M. ^{2)}
ÖVP	1378	45	12	1593	53	
Liste Ingrid Baumhackl	877	28	7	nicht kandidiert		
SPÖ	488	16	4	638	21	
FPÖ	209	7	1	251	8	
Die Grünen	133	4	1	136	5	
Mit Josef Eisner für Unterpremstätten	nicht kandidiert			370	12	
Wahlbeteiligung	64%			73%		

^{1)} The municipality amalgamation now carried was followed in the voting results.
^{2)} The notional comparison election shows at Fusion municipalities summed votes of the original communities. Therefore, comparisons are not possible.

=== Coat of arms ===

Old town crests

Unterpremstätten

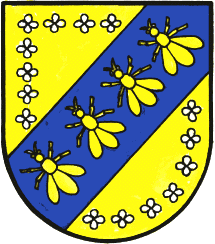
Zettling

The coats of arms of the dissolved communities lost their official validity on January 1, 2015. The new award took effect on 25 January 2016.
The blazon (crest description) reads:

"Above a shield-foot with a red, silver-grooved brick wall, on the right in silver, a green spruce, on the left in blue, three natural bees".

== Infrastructure ==
=== Transport ===
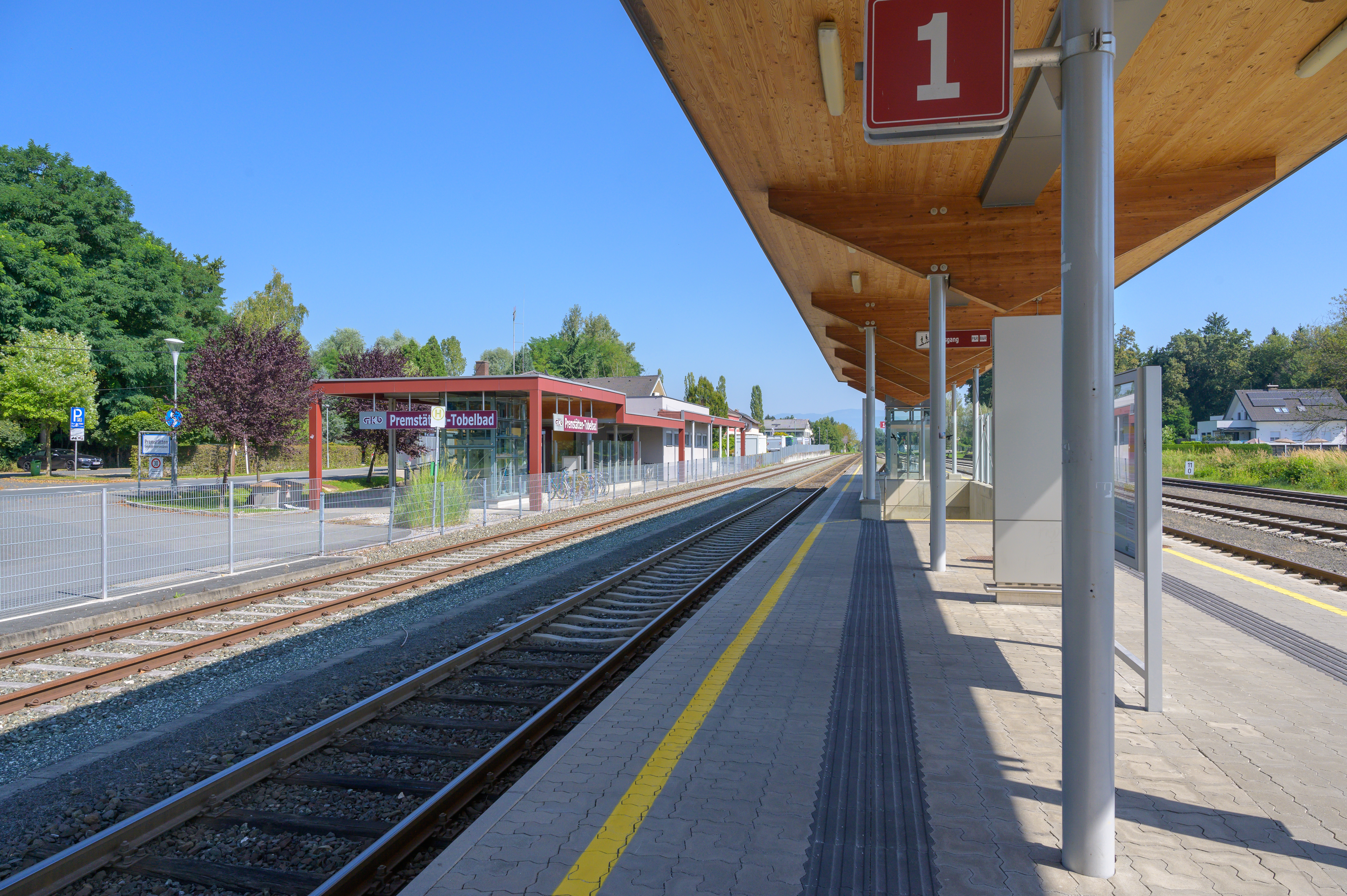
The platform at Premstätten-Tobelbad railway station in 2023.

Premstätten has a station on the Köflach railway line, which runs between Graz Hauptbahnhof and Köflach. Multiple services of the Styria S-Bahn stop at the station.

=== Safety ===
In Premstätten, the Polizeiinspektion (PI) established that the district police command is under Graz-Umgebung. The PI is locally responsible for the municipalities of Premstätten and Dobl-Zwaring.

Furthermore, the highway patrol inspection (API) Graz West for the A2 and A9 motorways has its headquarters in Premstätten Bäckweg, founded in 1974 as a department of the highway gendarmerie.

== Culture and sights ==
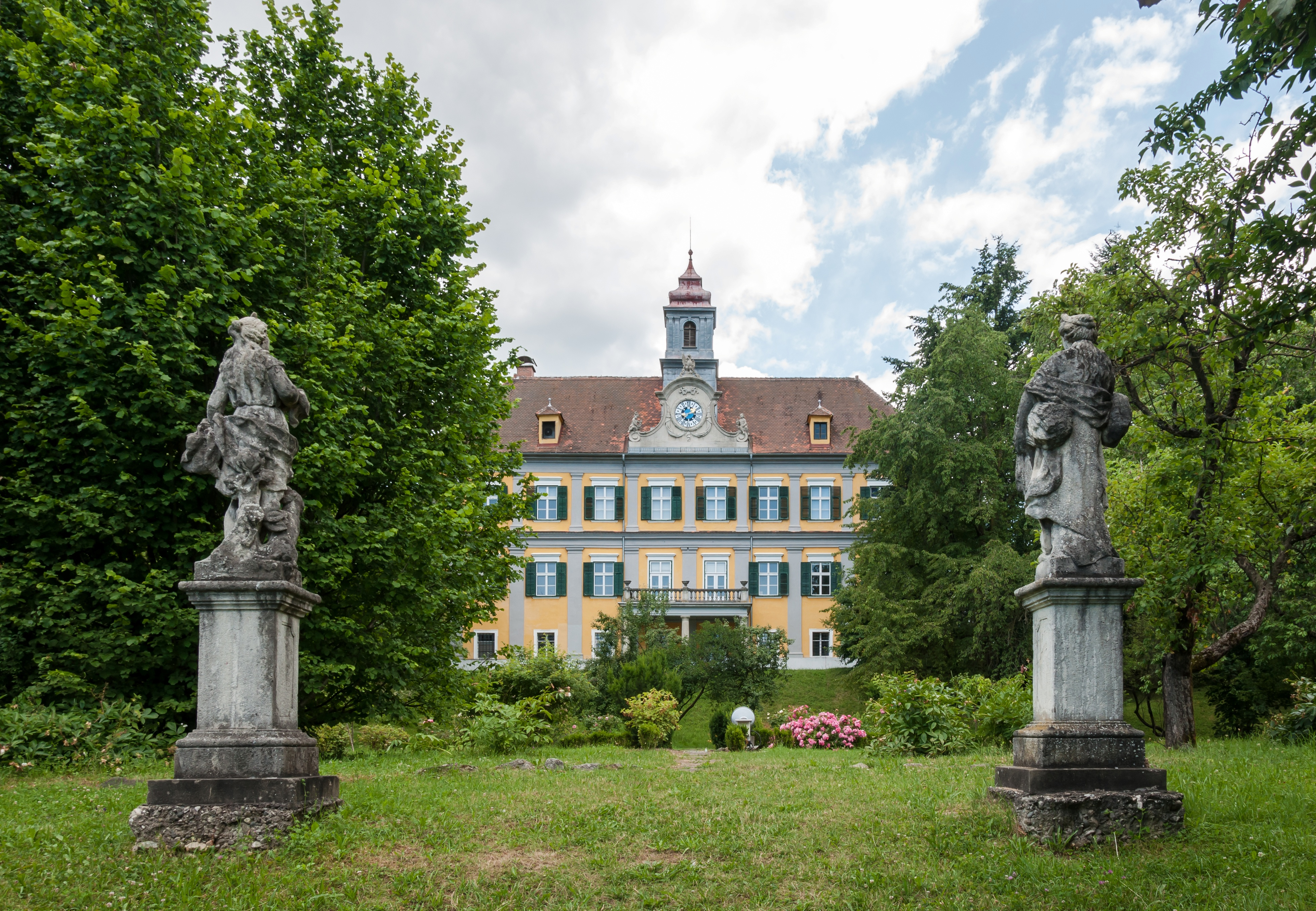
Schloss Premstätten
