= Köflach railway line =

Railway line in Austria

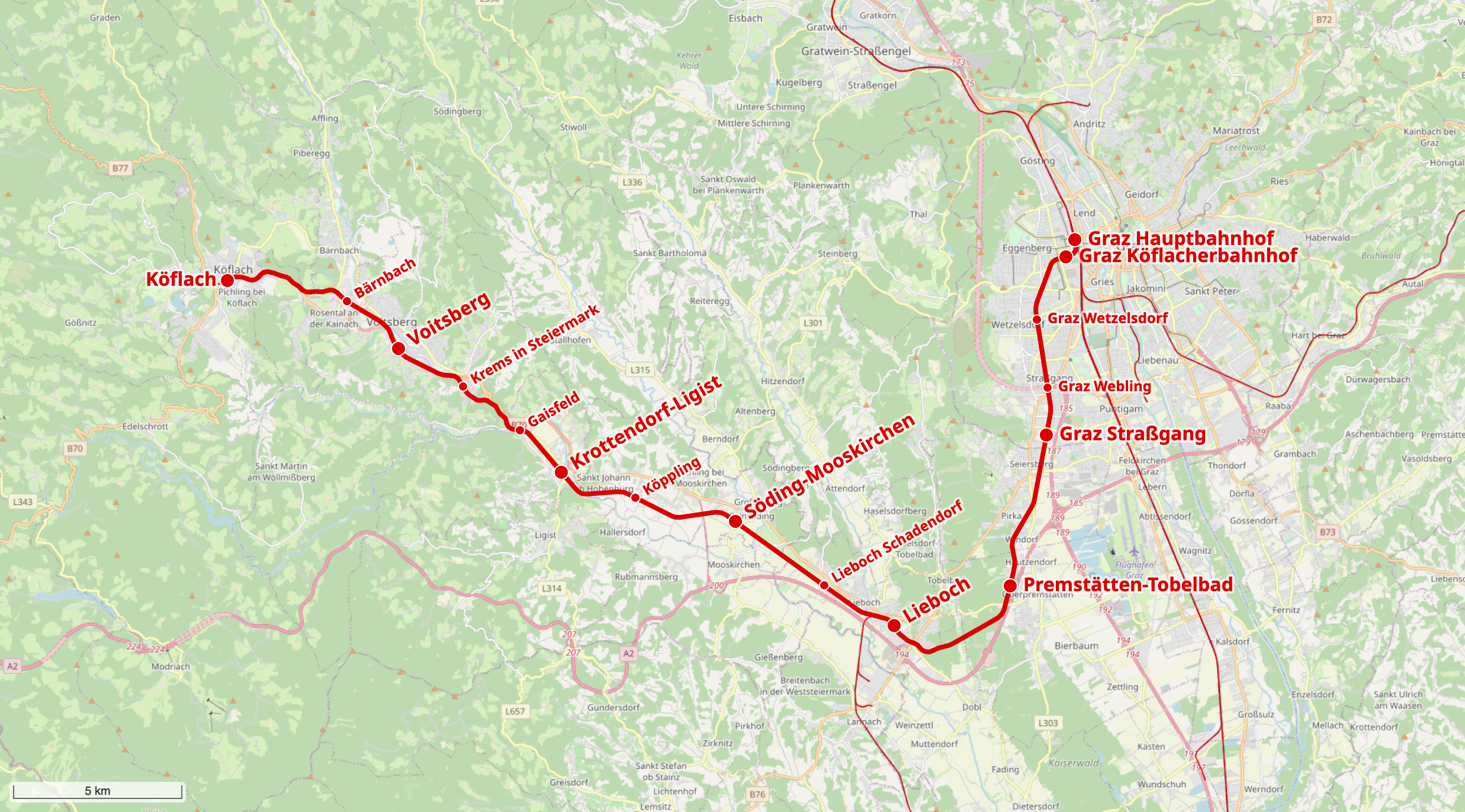
- Route map

Overview
- Owner: ÖBB
- Termini: Graz; Köflach
- Stations: 16

Service
- Route number: 43401
- Operator(s): Graz-Köflacher Bahn und Busbetrieb

History
- Opened: 3 April 1860

Technical
- Line length: 40.2 km (25.0 mi)
- Track gauge: 1,435 mm (4 ft 8 1/2 in) standard gauge
- Electrification: 2026
- Highest elevation: 448 m (1,470 ft)

The Köflach railway line (German: Köflacherbahn) is a standard gauge railway line in the province of Styria in Austria. It runs 40.2 kilometres (25.0 mi) from a junction with the Southern railway line at Graz Hauptbahnhof to Köflach. Graz-Köflacher Bahn und Busbetrieb (GKB) owns and operates the line.

== History ==
The Graz-Köflacher Eisenbahn- und Bergbaugesellschaft (lit. 'Graz-Köflach Railway and Mining Company') was established in 1856 to construct a railway line from Köflach to Graz. The line opened for goods traffic on 3 April 1860; passenger service began on 1 November. The Wieserbahn, which branches off south from the line at Lieboch, opened on 8 April 1873. Ownership of the line was transferred to ÖBB in 2024 as part of plans to electrify and modernize both lines.

== Route ==
The line originates at Graz Hauptbahnhof, on the west side of Graz, and runs south to Lieboch, where the Wieserbahn continues south. The line then turns west and follows the Kainach river to Bärnbach. At Bärnbach, it crosses the Kainach and follows the Gradnerbach tributary to Köflach.

== Operation ==
Graz-Köflacher Bahn und Busbetrieb (GKB) operates two services of the Styria S-Bahn over the line. The S7 operates hourly, with additional service on weekdays, over the entire line between Graz and Köflach. The S61 provides additional service via Lieboch to Wies-Eibiswald via the Wieserbahn.

== Stations ==
Name	Locality	Services	Coordinates
Graz Hauptbahnhof	Graz	Austrian Federal Railways Styria S-Bahn	47°04′19″N 15°25′01″E
Graz Köflacherbahnhof	Graz	Styria S-Bahn	47°04′06″N 15°24′50″E
Graz Wetzelsdorf	Graz	Styria S-Bahn	47°03′05″N 15°24′05″E
Graz Webling	Graz	Styria S-Bahn	47°01′56″N 15°24′21″E
Graz Straßgang	Graz	Styria S-Bahn	47°01′15″N 15°24′20″E
Premstätten-Tobelbad	Premstätten	Styria S-Bahn	46°58′47″N 15°23′28″E
Lieboch	Lieboch	Styria S-Bahn	46°58′07″N 15°20′44″E
Lieboch Schadendorf	Lieboch	Styria S-Bahn	46°58′47″N 15°19′03″E
Söding-Mooskirchen	Söding-Sankt Johann	Styria S-Bahn	46°59′49″N 15°16′58″E
Köppling	Söding-Sankt Johann	Styria S-Bahn	47°00′11″N 15°14′38″E
Krottendorf-Ligist	Krottendorf-Gaisfeld	Styria S-Bahn	47°00′35″N 15°12′52″E
Gaisfeld	Krottendorf-Gaisfeld	Styria S-Bahn	47°01′17″N 15°11′50″E
Krems in Steiermark	Voitsberg	Styria S-Bahn	47°01′58″N 15°10′32″E
Voitsberg	Voitsberg	Styria S-Bahn	47°02′36″N 15°09′01″E
Bärnbach	Bärnbach	Styria S-Bahn	47°03′21″N 15°07′47″E
Köflach	Köflach	Styria S-Bahn	47°03′42″N 15°04′58″E
