= Leoben Hauptbahnhof =

Railway station in Styria, Austria

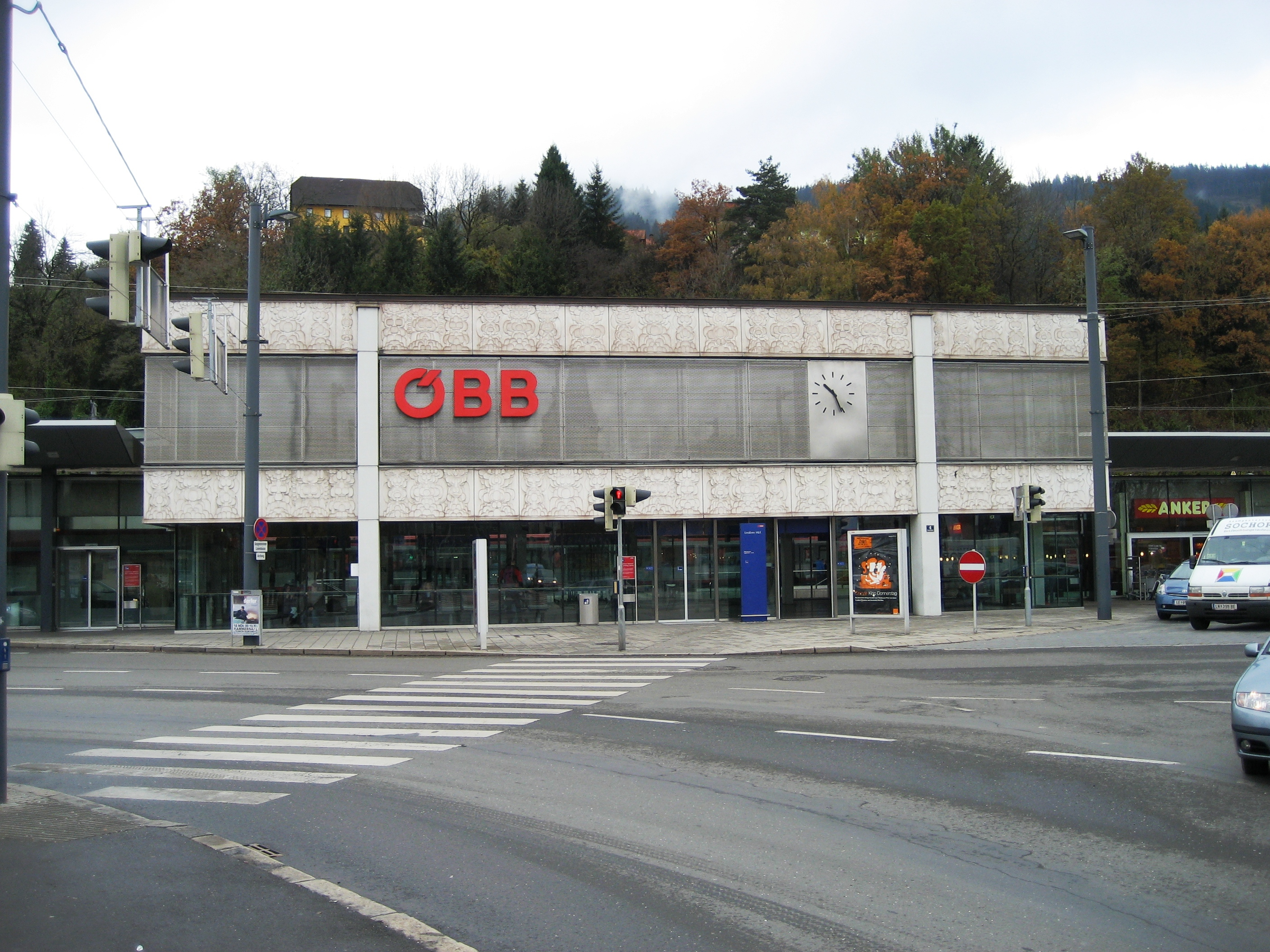
- The station building in 2009

General information
- Location: Bahnhofplatz 4 Leoben; Austria
- Coordinates: 47°23′12″N 15°05′23″E
- Owner: Austrian Federal Railways (ÖBB)
- Lines: Rudolf Railway; Bruck an der Mur–Leoben railway
- Distance: 16.5 km (10.3 mi) from Bruck an der Mur
- Train operators: ÖBB
Services
Preceding station	EuroCity	Following station
St. Michael in Oberstmk towards Frankfurt (Main) Hbf	EuroCity	Graz Hbf Terminus
St. Michael in Oberstmk towards Saarbrücken Hbf	EuroCity	Graz Hbf Terminus
St. Michael in Oberstmk towards Zürich HB	EuroCity	Graz Hbf Terminus
Preceding station	ÖBB	Following station
Knittelfeld towards Venezia Santa Lucia	Railjet	Bruck an der Mur towards Wien Hbf
Sankt Veit an der Glan towards Venezia Santa Lucia	Railjet	Bruck an der Mur towards Wien Hbf
Rottenmann Stadt towards Linz Hbf	InterCity	Graz Hbf Terminus
St. Michael in Oberstmk towards Salzburg Hbf	InterCity	Graz Hbf Terminus
St. Michael in Oberstmk towards Innsbruck Hbf	InterCity	Graz Hbf Terminus
Knittelfeld towards Villach Hbf	InterCity	Bruck an der Mur towards Wien Hbf
Knittelfeld towards Roma Termini or La Spezia Centrale	Nightjet	Bruck an der Mur towards Wien Hbf
St. Michael in Oberstmk towards Zürich HB	Nightjet	Bruck an der Mur towards Graz Hbf
Preceding station	Styria S-Bahn	Following station
St. Michael in Oberstmk towards Unzmarkt	S8	Leoben Lerchenfeld towards Bruck an der Mur
Location

Leoben Hauptbahnhof is the main station at Leoben, a city in the federal state of Styria in Austria. The station is located on the Bruck an der Mur–Leoben railway. West of the station, the Rudolf Railway branches off to the north.

== Services ==
As of the December 2022 timetable change, the following services stop at Leoben Hauptbahnhof:

- EuroCity: daily service between Graz and Frankfurt (Main), Saarbrücken, and Zürich.
- Railjet: service every two hours between Wien (Vienna) and Villach; some trains continue from Villach to Venezia Santa Lucia or Lienz in Osttirol.
- Nightjet:
  - overnight service between Vienna and La Spezia Centrale or Roma Termini (Rome).
  - overnight service between Graz and Zürich.
- InterCity: service to Vienna, Graz, Innsbruck, Linz, Salzburg, and Villach.
- Styria S-Bahn: hourly service between Unzmarkt and Bruck an der Mur.
