= Lieboch =

- Municipality
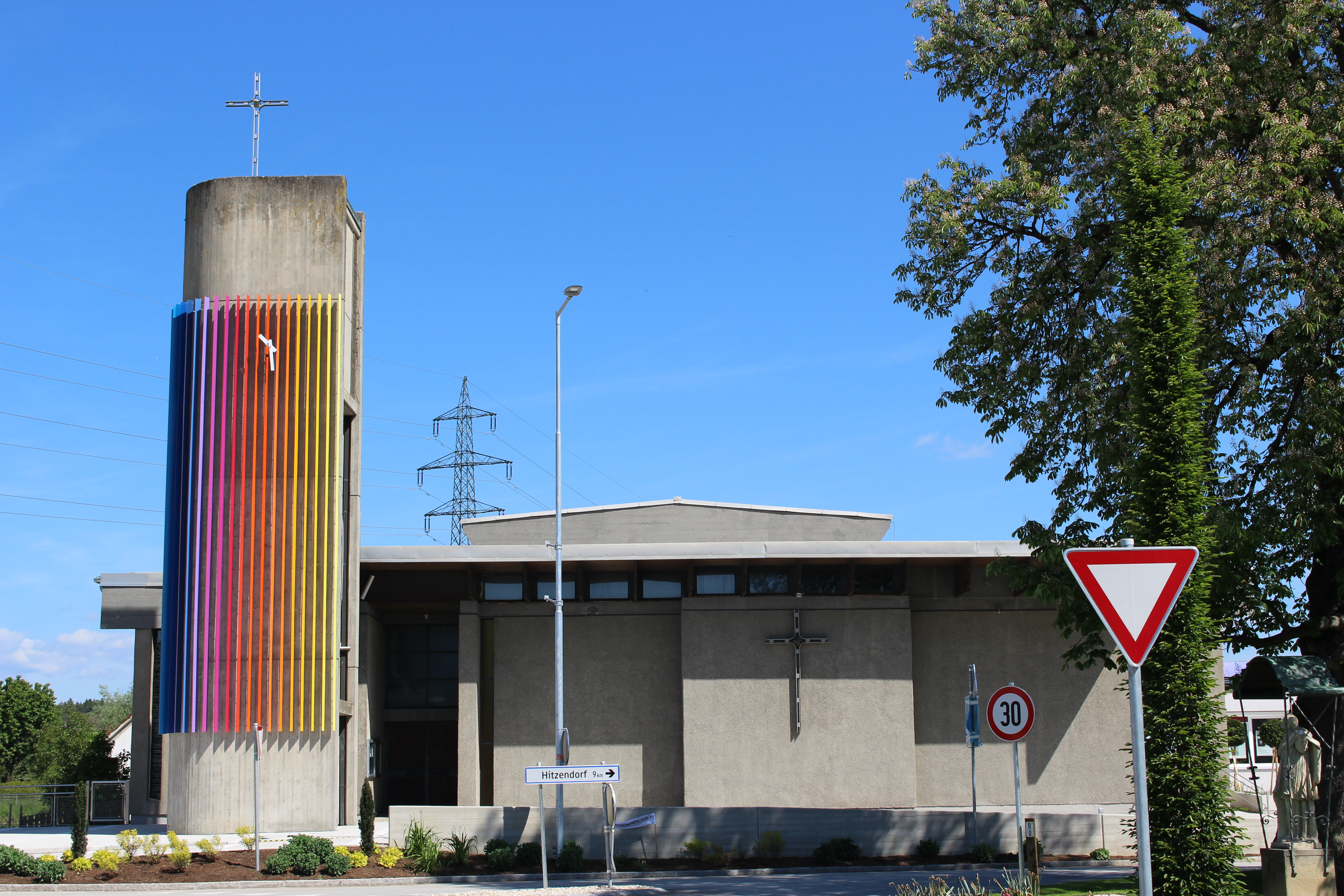
- Parish church

- Coat of arms

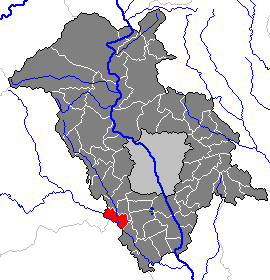
- Location within Graz-Umgebung district

- Location within Austria
- Coordinates: 46°58′27″N 15°20′15″E
- Country: Austria
- State: Styria
- District: Graz-Umgebung

Government
  - Mayor: Stefan Helmreich (ÖVP)

Area
  - Total: 11.76 km^{2} (4.54 sq mi)
- Elevation: 334 m (1,096 ft)

Population (2018-01-01)
  - Total: 5,096
  - Density: 433.3/km^{2} (1,122/sq mi)
- Time zone: UTC+1 (CET)
  - Summer (DST): UTC+2 (CEST)
- Postal code: 8501
- Area code: 0 31 36
- Vehicle registration: GU
- Website: www.lieboch.com

Lieboch (German: [liˈbɔx]) is a municipality in the district of Graz-Umgebung in the Austrian state of Styria.

== Population ==
Historical population
Year	Pop.	±%
1869	614	—
1880	664	+8.1%
1890	769	+15.8%
1900	733	−4.7%
1910	827	+12.8%
1923	894	+8.1%
1934	1,160	+29.8%
1939	1,198	+3.3%
1951	1,642	+37.1%
1961	2,004	+22.0%
1971	2,457	+22.6%
1981	2,859	+16.4%
1991	3,363	+17.6%
2001	3,995	+18.8%
2011	4,691	+17.4%
2021	5,438	+15.9%

== Infrastructure ==
Lieboch has two stations, Lieboch and Lieboch Schadendorf, on the Köflach railway line, which runs between Graz Hauptbahnhof and Köflach. Multiple services of the Styria S-Bahn stop at the stations.
