= Dobl-Zwaring =

- Municipality
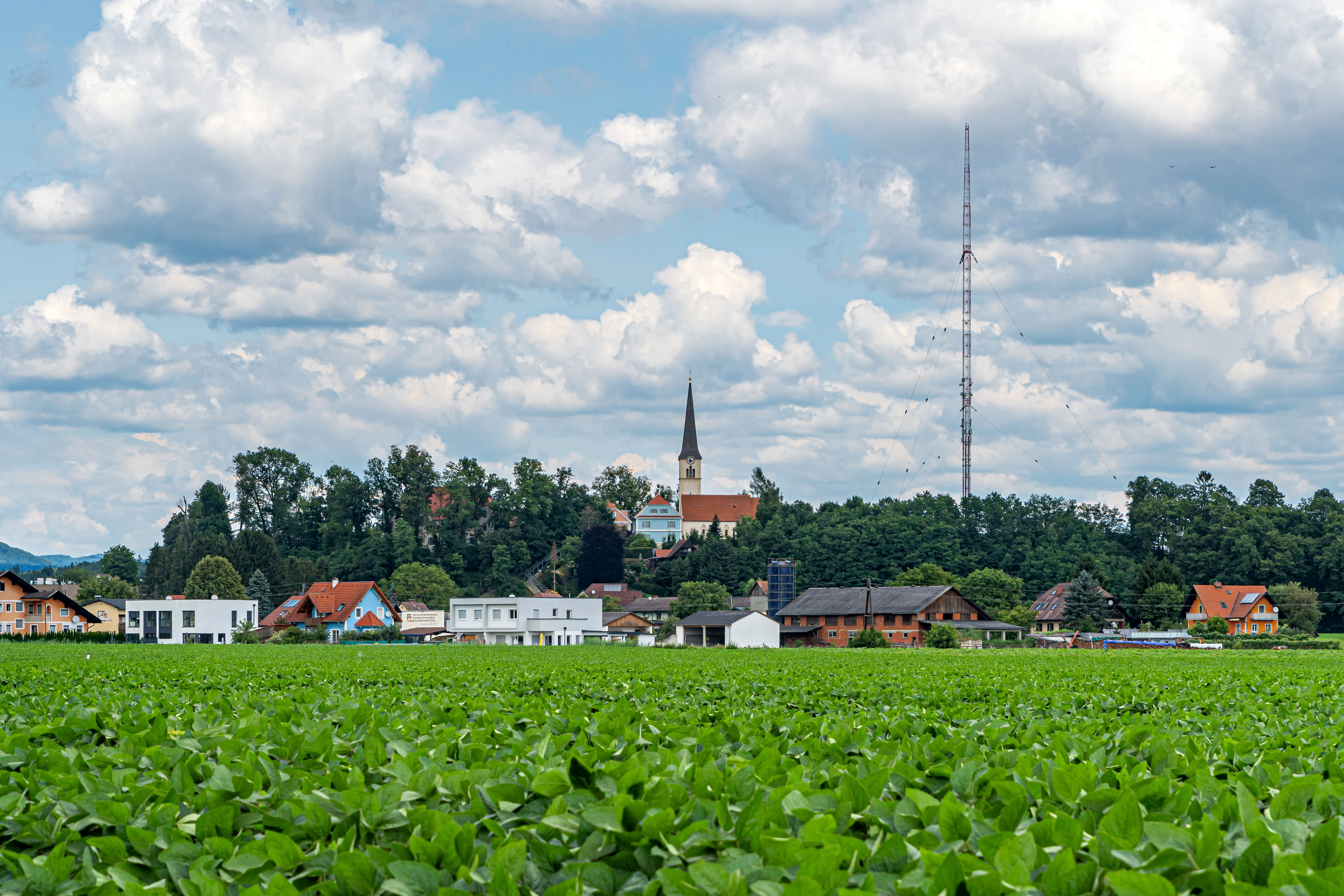
- View of Dobl

- Coat of arms

- Location within Austria
- Coordinates: 46°56′48″N 15°22′35″E
- Country: Austria
- State: Styria
- District: Graz-Umgebung

Government
  - Mayor: Anton Weber (ÖVP)

Area
  - Total: 37.66 km^{2} (14.54 sq mi)

Population (2018-01-01)
  - Total: 3,537
  - Density: 93.92/km^{2} (243.2/sq mi)
- Time zone: UTC+1 (CET)
  - Summer (DST): UTC+2 (CEST)
- Postal code: 8142, 8143, 8504, 8141, 8410, 8411, 8503
- Area code: 03136
- Website: www.dobl-zwaring.gv.at

Dobl-Zwaring is a market town with 3,445 residents (as of 1 January 2016) in Styria, Austria. It lies in the southwest part of Graz-Umgebung District.

The municipality was founded as part of the Styria municipal structural reform, on 31 December 2014, from the dissolved independent municipalities Dobl und Zwaring-Pöls.

== Geography ==
=== Geographic layout ===
Dobl-Zwaring is located in the southwest part of the Graz-Umgebung District, about 14 kilometres (8.7 mi) south of Graz.

The municipality crosses the Kainach river, a branch of the Mur. The area belongs to Weststeiermark.

=== Municipality arrangement ===
The municipality territory includes the following 11 sections (populations as of 1 January 2016)):

- Dietersdorf (285)
- Dobl (824)
- Fading (186)
- Lamberg (114)
- Muttendorf (575)
- Petzendorf (87)
- Pöls an der Wieserbahn (174)
- Steindorf (188)
- Weinzettl (401)
- Wuschan (215)
- Zwaring (394)

Dobl-Zwaring consists of eight Katastralgemeinden (areas as of 2015):

- Dietersdorf (705.31 ha or 1,742.9 acres)
- Dobl (585.02 ha or 1,445.6 acres)
- Lamberg (63.09 ha or 155.9 acres)
- Muttendorf (512.14 ha)
- Petzendorf (268.45 ha)
- Pöls (332.41 ha)
- Wuschan (352.58 ha)
- Zwaring (972.16 ha or 2,402.3 acres)

== Incorporations ==
The municipalities of Zwaring and Pöls were merged on 1 January 1968. Today's settlement was established on 1 January 2015, by merging the municipalities of Dobl and Zwaring-Pöls.

== History ==
Dobl was first mentioned as a "Tobel" in 1219 by Archbishop Eberhard II. from Salzburg to Sprengel, the newly established Diocese Seckau likewise. For centuries, the history of Dobl was determined by Gjaidhof Castle, which was a hunting lodge of Maria Theresa.

The history of Fading dates back to a settlement in Carolingian times. Its settlement history is examined in detail. The name is derived from the prefix "Fadi-" as meaning "man" in the sense of "warrior, hero". Names ending in "-ing" can, if added on the place or person names, in the German language area form evidence for settlements from the 7th to 9th century.

The first municipalities were founded as autonomous corporations in 1850. After the annexation of Austria by Germany in 1938, the municipalities came to the Reichsgau of Styria. Between 1945 and 1955, they were part of the British occupation zone in Austria. The former municipality of Pöls on the Wieserbahn was acquired on January 1, 1957 from the district of Leibnitz in the Graz-Umgebung District.

The municipalities of Zwaring and Pöls were merged on January 1, 1968, on the proposal of the district management team of Graz-Umgebung. Both municipalities voted for the voluntary merger in October 1967, as they received a higher share of the tax revenues. There was disagreement only when the commune was established. While the congregation Zwaring and the district capital pleaded for name "Zwaring-Pöls", the municipality Pöls voiced for "Pöls-Zwaring" because Pöls was first mentioned in 1244 as the older part of the village, and there "Zwaring-Pöls" alphabetically stood at the end of the municipalities in the Graz-Umgebung District.

== Coat of arms ==
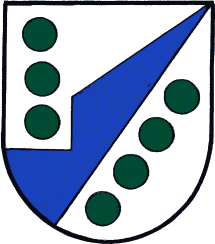
Zwaring-Pöls

The town crests of the dissolved communities lost their official validity on January 1, 2015.

On 29 October 2015, the municipal council decided to establish the former Dobler coat of arms as the coat of arms of the new market municipality, Dobl-Zwaring. After consultation with the National Archives to create a corresponding template, the Styrian government then awarded, with order of 25 February 2016, the market town the right to use the new municipal coat of arms beginning on 10 March 2016.

The blazon reads:

"In a shield divided from silver to green, above a pair of red stag antlers, and below a silver hunting horn on a straight string."

== Economy and Infrastructure ==
=== Transportation ===
The main village Dobl is located on the South motorway (A2); the nearest interchanges are Lieboch (194) 3 km (1.9 mi) away and Unterpremstätten (188) 5 km (3.1 mi). The Pyhrn motorway A9 can be reached via the junction Schachenwald (192), 5 km.

The southern part of the municipality is located off the main road, but is well connected to the regional road network. The Pyhrn motorway A9 can be reached via the interchanges Wundschuh (197) and Wildon (202).

A train station is not available in the municipal area, but the neighboring communities offer access to:

- the Graz-Köflach Railway: in Unterpremstätten and Lieboch, the route Graz-Köflach and in Lieboch and Lannach the route (Graz)-Lieboch-Wies-Eibiswald,
- the southern railway and Koralmbahn: in Kalsdorf and Werndorf.

The Graz Airport is easily accessible from all the districts.

=== Established businesses ===
The area includes:

- the substation Kainachtal the Austrian electricity-AG.
- the Service Area Kaiserwald on the motorway A 2.

== Culture and sights ==
=== Buildings ===
The Pöls castle was first mentioned in 1244 as Zehenthof the Bishop of Salzburg. At the end of the 16th century, it was converted into a nobleman's seat, which in the later period frequently changed hands. Late 18th century, the castle eventually served as a brewery, which was however already in 1801 again closed. In 1840, the estate was owned by the Saffran family, most recently by Ludwig Freiherr von Saffran until 1855. Estate and castle were Pöls were acquired in 1855 by Friederike, Duchess of Oldenburg, nee Baroness from Washington to her marriage to Maximilian Emanuel von Washington, a relative of the first President of the United States, George Washington. The family commissioned the Viennese architect Moritz Wappler with basic reconstruction works, which were partly trained as "buildings in the Swiss township". A contemporary source of the "poultry barn" ... built according to the most rational principles, provided with eggs, brood and mast rooms, offers room for about 30 breeds of different chickens and pheasants, which lead their spurs to the places with low wire grids The garden side. "There was also a luxury horse stallion in the business area of the castle. The estate comprised 108 hectares (270 acres) of land and several hectares of leased land.

The Pöls Castle became an agricultural model enterprise under the Washington family. Maximilian von Washington was in contemporary literature as "one of the finest authorities of Austria in areas of agriculture and farmers".

The farm was a model for poultry, fish, pigs and horses, but also for working with agricultural machinery. At his coronation as King of Hungary in 1876 the Austrian Emperor Franz Joseph I rode on a stallion from the Pölser stable. Maximilian von Washington organized in 1863 in Pöls the first agricultural exhibition of Styria.

The complex of the castle park, whose grounds were almost bald on the acquisition in 1855, goes back to Friederike von Oldenburg, which also had exotic plants, such as this tulip tree, laciniate Beech, paulownia and other plants. In later years the focus was on poultry farming; is also documented an extensive consignments of hatching eggs within the framework.
In the years 1870-71, the manor was for family reasons in economic difficulties, but was able to recover it again, stayed in their possession until the death of Friederike von Washington on 20 March 1891, and then went to her son, George von Washington. On the occasion of his second marriage with Maria Kreuzig on November 24, 1924, George von Washington transferred all his property to his wife (with the exception of small donations to his daughter, Hubert von Hohenpriel). Maria von Washington sold the castle, together with its estate, to the family Freiherren von Allesch in 1928, which still exists today. (H. Roessmann, great-grandson of Maria von Washington).

- A sight to mention is the Dobl transmitter, a medium-wave transmitter from the Second World War. The transmission tower stands as well as the broadcasting center, in which the private radio station Antenne Steiermark had its headquarters, as a historical monument.

=== Natural monuments ===
On 23 June 2003 in the park at Pöls, a giant spruce (or grand fir) was uprooted, which in 1856 by King I. Otto of Greece (cousin of Emperor Franz Joseph I of Austria - the father of Otto I and the mother of Francis Joseph Were siblings and brother-in-law of Marie Friederike von Washington), was planted together with his wife Amalie (duchess of Oldenburg and sister of Friederike von Washington), on the occasion of his visit to Pöls Castle, and had a height of 5 m (16 ft) (H. Rößmann - quoted from the Upper Bavarian Archive, Volume 131).

=== Holy Rinn ===
The "Holy Rinn" is a mountain spring in a forest area in the south of the municipality. The water of this source is said to have been given special powers, since in the nineteenth century an almost blind woodsman was beginning to see better with this water by washing his eyes. The site was restored in the years 2001-02 and was consecrated on 14 August 2006 by the minister of Preding.

== Historical maps ==
The municipality territory in the Austro-Hungarian Register from 1790 to 1910

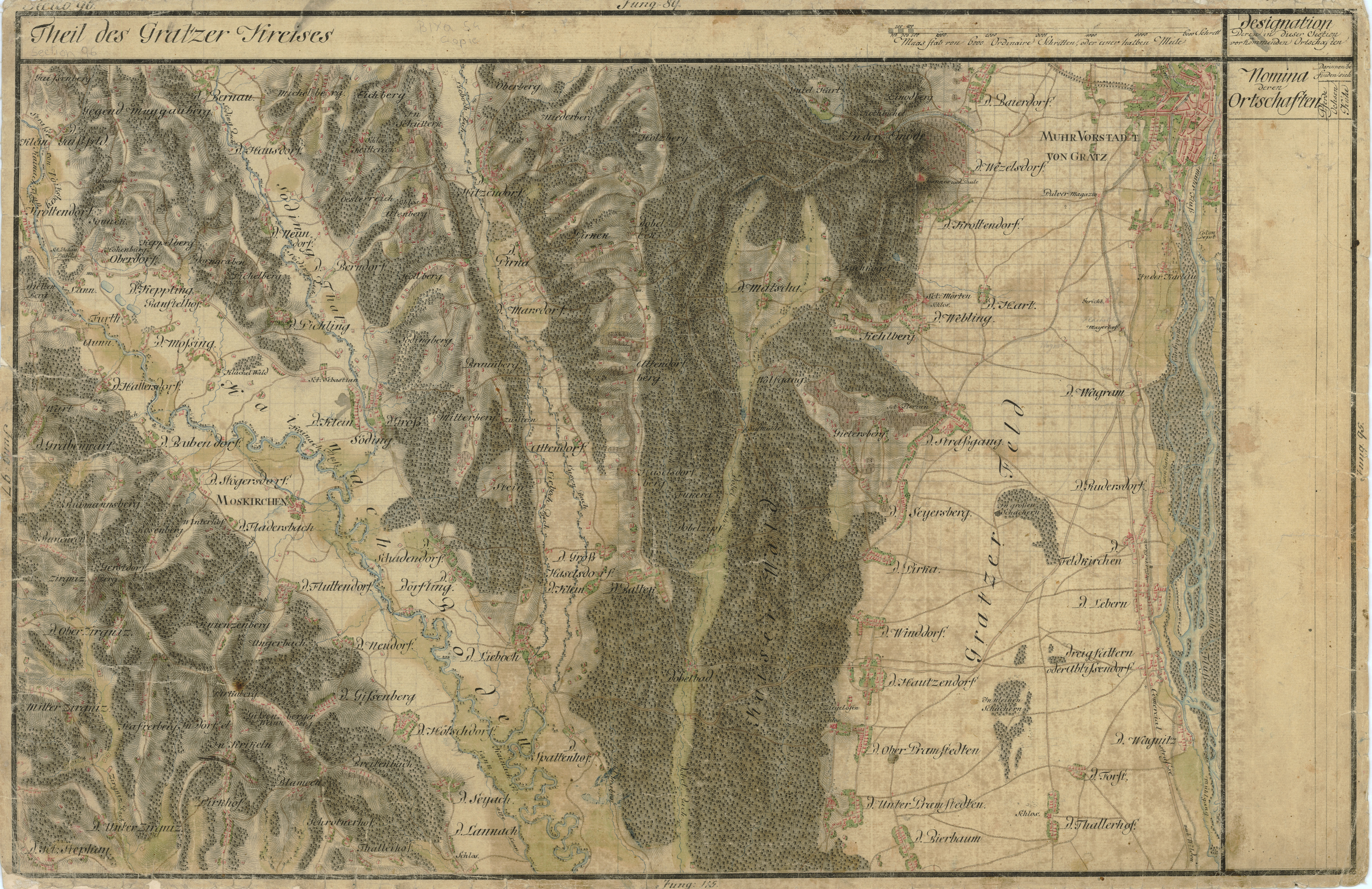
The area north of Dobl mit Dobelbad and Dobelzipf in the Josephinischen Landesaufnahme c.1790

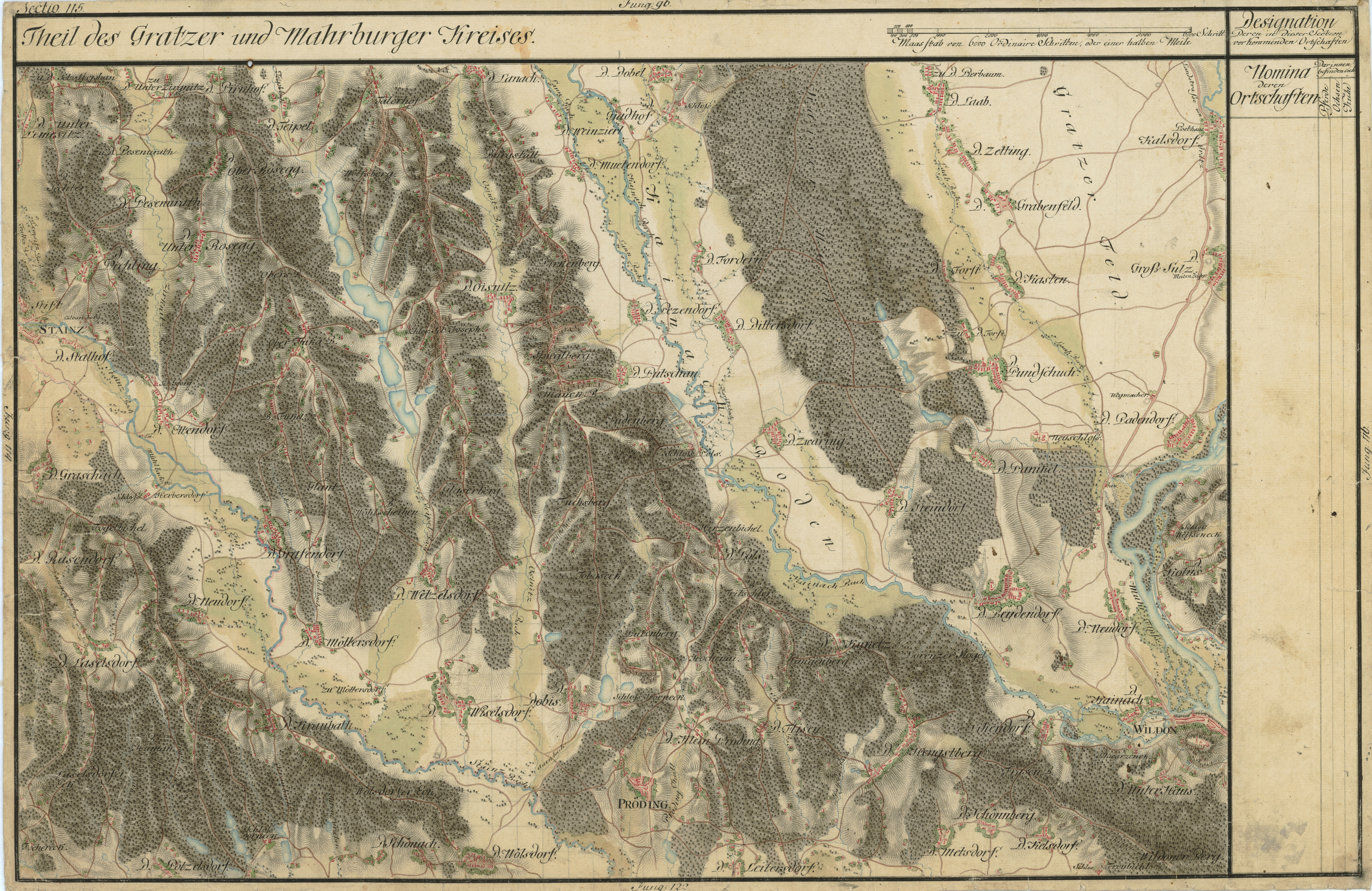
Village Dobl and Fading as „D(orf) Fordern“; c.1790

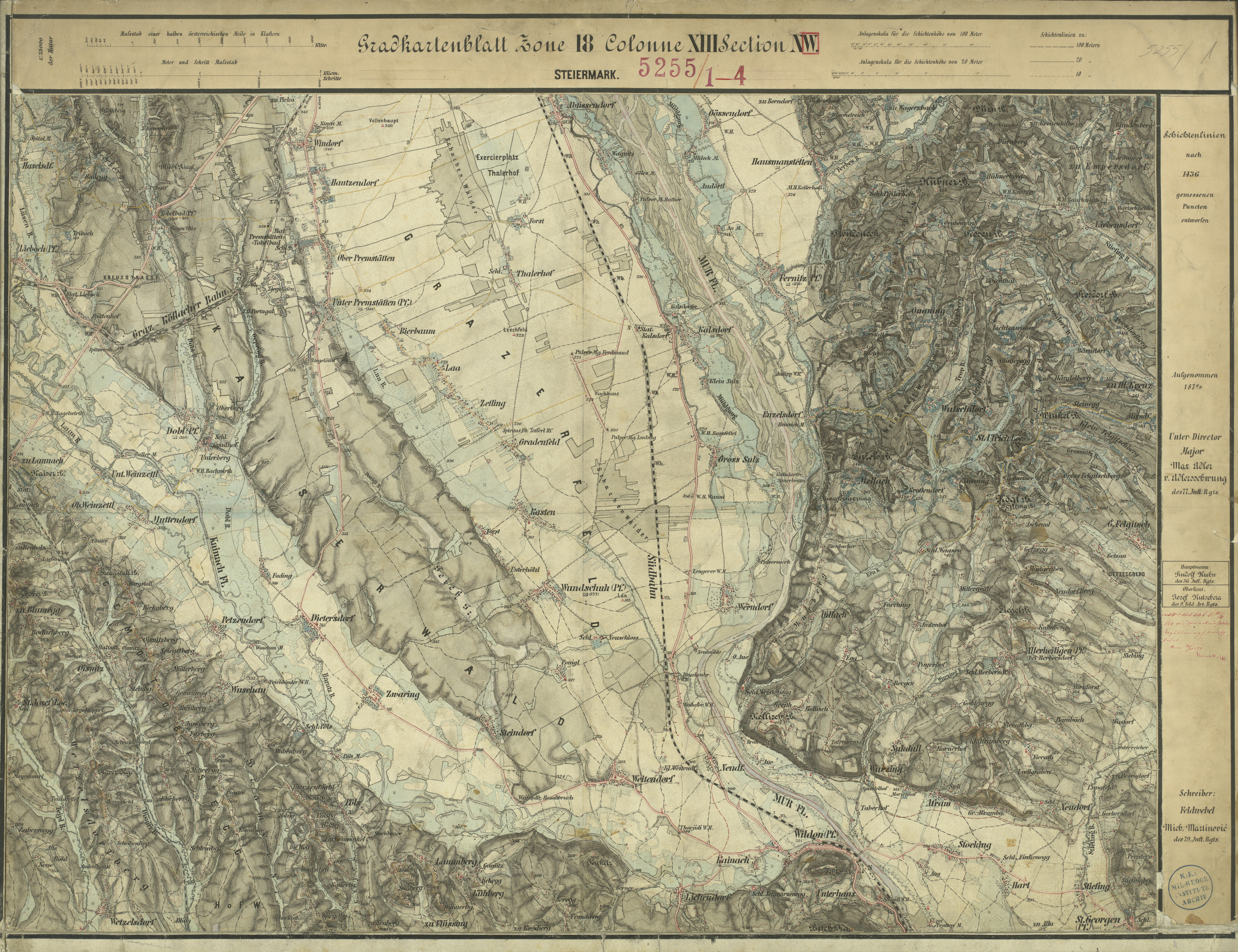
Dobl north of Kainachtals, Franzisco-Josephinische Landesaufnahme c.1878/79

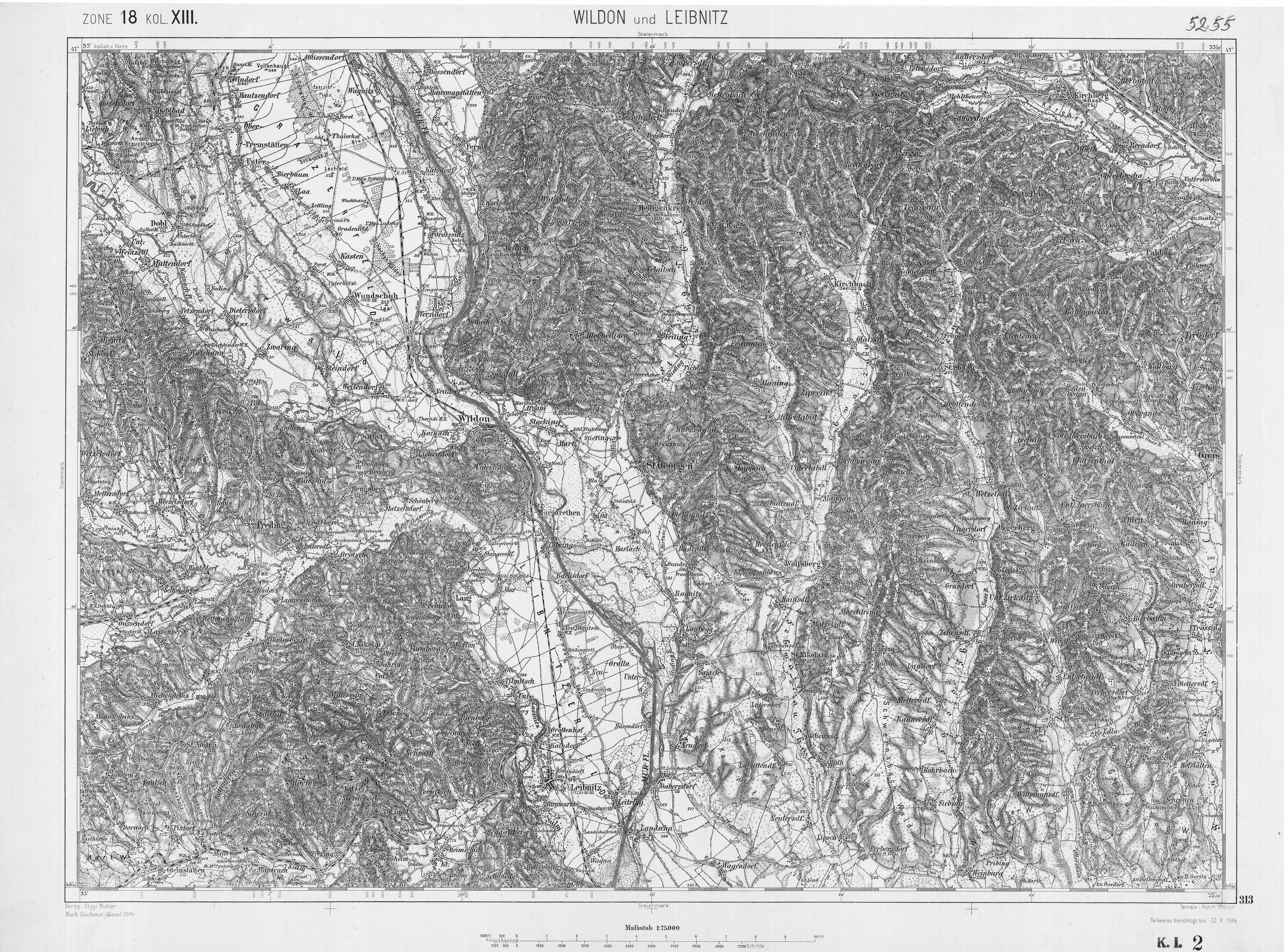
The town region in Franzisco-Josephinischen Landesaufnahme c.1910
