= Bruck an der Mur–Leoben railway =

Railway line in Austria

Overview
- Line number: 413 01

Service
- Route number: 250 (Bischofshofen – Leoben); 600 (Wien Meidling – Tarvisio)

History
- Opened: 1 September 1868

Technical
- Line length: 23.4 km (14.5 mi)
- Number of tracks: 2
- Track gauge: 1,435 mm (4 ft 8 1/2 in) standard gauge
- Electrification: 15 kV 16.7 Hz AC
- Operating speed: 160 km/h (99 mph) (max)
- Maximum incline: 1.0%

The Bruck an der Mur–Leoben railway is a main line in Styria, Austria. It was opened on 1 September 1868 by the Austrian Southern Railway Company (Südbahngesellschaft). It is part of the core network of ÖBB Infra.

The line is one of the most important railways in Austria as it forms part of the Vienna–Klagenfurt–Villach (–Lienz/–Venice) long-distance route. The line is currently operated by Railjets (or an IC train on the Vienna–Lienz route) every two hours.

Line S8 (Unzmarkt—Leoben—Bruck an der Mur) of the S-Bahn Steiermark also runs on the Bruck an der Mur–Leoben railway.

The route is also used by InterCity and EuroCity services on the Graz–Salzburg (–Germany) and Innsbruck/Zürich routes.

Until 1998, services on the St. Michael–Leoben section of the Rudolf Railway ran through the Annaberg tunnel via Leoben-Hinterberg station and, after bypassing the Häuselberg, via Leoben Göss to Leoben Hauptbahnhof. Since then, the 5460 m-long Galgenberg tunnel has replaced most of this section up to the Annaberg tunnel. The Leoben 2 junction–Leoben Göss section was permanently closed on 9 December 2012 and is only used for the storage of freight wagons.
