= Dobl =

- Former municipality
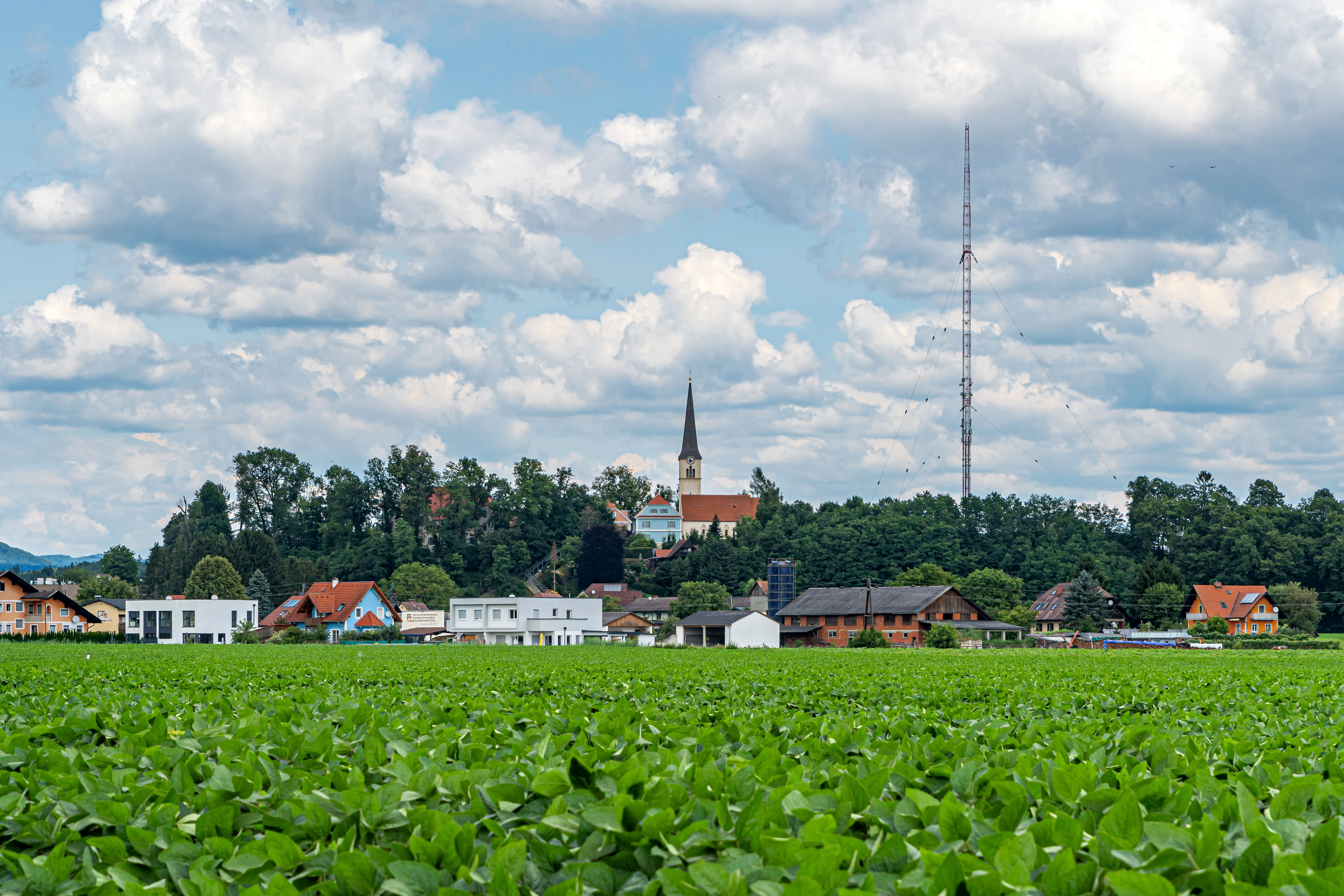

- Coat of arms

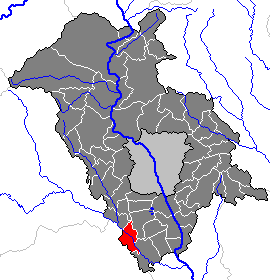
- Location within Graz-Umgebung district

- Location within Austria
- Coordinates: 46°56′48″N 15°22′35″E
- Country: Austria
- State: Styria
- District: Graz-Umgebung

Area
  - Total: 13.76 km^{2} (5.31 sq mi)
- Elevation: 362 m (1,188 ft)

Population (2014-01-01)
  - Total: 1,805
  - Density: 131.2/km^{2} (339.7/sq mi)
- Time zone: UTC+1 (CET)
  - Summer (DST): UTC+2 (CEST)
- Postal code: 8143
- Area code: 03136
- Vehicle registration: GU
- Website: www.dobl.at

Dobl was a municipality in Austria which merged in January 2015 into Dobl-Zwaring in the Graz-Umgebung District of Styria, Austria.

== Geography ==
Dobl is located in the Kaiser forest in the valley of the Kainach River, about 14 km (8.7 mi) southwest of Graz.
