= Hubert Eisner =

Austrian Nazi

Hubert Eisner (born 7 August 1897 in Köflach, Austria; 16 August 1969) was an Austrian Nazi and became Kreisleiter of Voitsberg.

== Biography ==
Eisner attended primary (Volksschule) and secondary (Hauptschule) schools, and completed his education in Fachhochschule. He was taught and impressed by pan-German thinking. After school, he went to work running his father's mill, made it flourishing business. At the begin of the 1930s he sympathized with the illegal Austrian National Socialist movement. Eisner joined the Nazi Party on 1 May 1934.

Belonging to a group of former participants of the paramilitary organization Heimatschutz, he saw himself as weak Nazi. On 19 February 1934 he was arrested for illegal arming and therefore did not take part in the failed July Putsch. After the failed uprising against the Austrian state, Eisner tried to convince his former Heimatschutz members and the NSDAP group they had built with others to follow the Vaterländische Front. This wasn't successful and Eisner became isolated within the illegal Styrian NSDAP.

At this time he came into contact with Sepp Helfrich. Beginning in 1936, he started new activities within NSDAP with the help of Helfrich.

In June 1936 Eisner became the illegal Kreisleiter (Nazi Party county leader) of Voitsberg. Beneath the Gauleiter (regional leader) were lower-level officials, the so-called Kreisleiter (county leaders). This early career as illegal Kreisleiter ended a year later in May 1937. Eisner had personal differences with NSDAP-Landesleiter Josef Leopold, and chose to leave his Kreisleiter position over that difference.

When the NSDAP came to power in Austria, Eisner wasn't engaged in the party organization. In October 1938, Burgenland was dissolved and its territory divided among the Reichsgaue of Lower Danube and Styria. Tobias Portschy was appointed Gauleiter of Styria. He once stated that Hubert Eisner was still candidate for Kreisleiter, but he could not achieve this function against internal opposition.

In July 1938 Kreisleiter Anton Weissensteiner invited Eisner to engage in party politics. Beginning in August 1939, Eisner was installed as Kreiswirtschaftsberater (county economic minister) and in April 1940 he finally took over Weissensteiner's agenda and became deputy Kreisleiter. Beginning in November 1940 he was head of the Ortsgruppe Köflach. In November 1941, after Weissensteiner was called to army service, Eisner finally took over the position of Kreisleiter in the county of Voitsberg. During this time he still made his living as owner and tradesman of the mill. He refused to be paid for his function as Kreisleiter.

At the end of the war Kreisler was arrested by the British in Wolfsberg and interned. In the following trial at the Volksgericht Graz, Eisner was sentenced to 10 years in prison. He was released in 1949 by an act of amnesty passed by the Austrian president Karl Renner, supported by the Austrian People's Party and Social Democratic Party of Austria. He lived out the remainder of his life in Köflach as a free man.
