= Hannah Perschel =

Hannah Perschel (born 1940 in Köflach, Styria) is an Austrian born and raised artist of Swiss nationality. With her basic art education in painting and typography at the Zurich School of Art and Design Perschel continued her learning at the international summer academy in Salzburg. Influenced by masters Joseph Mikl and Emilo Vedova, she soon started to develop her own distinctive style of paintings focusing in her works on the effects and interactions of lights and colors.

Perschel's interest in chromatics and the effects of lights redirected her artistic talents with noticeable impact on her works. Since 1989 she conducts chromatic seminars and courses in painting in Germany, Switzerland and Austria. Starting in 1993, she further deepened her expertise and education in the interdisciplinary composition of colors in the area of architecture at the International Association of Color Consultants (IACC) represented by the alliance of European color consultants (BEF) in Salzburg.

In 1996 Perschel graduated with a revolutionizing diploma work: Perception of colors and effects of compositions of colors in the medical field. Her work was established at the Gynecological department of the Zurich University Hospital.

== Influences ==
Professors: Joseph Mikl, Vienna; Emilio Vedova, Milano; Rudolf Hradil, Salzburg; Bruce McLean, London; Jürgen Partenheimer, Cologne. Graphic print assignment by Professor Josef Schneeweiss, Graz.

Self-studies of theories of colors: Johann Wolfgang von Goethe, Rudolf Steiner, Wilhelm von Bezold, Johannes Itten, Carry van Biema, Wilhelm Ostwald, Harald Küppers and others.

Natural science literature, in particular the physical laws of light: A.P. Speiser; the physical laws of colors: Ernst Boller, Donald Brinkmann, Emil J. Walter, Kirlian literature. Bio photonic: F. A. Popp.

Literature: Ernst Schrödinger: “What is life?”; Marcus Chown: „Warum Gott doch würfelt“; Thomas Görnitz: „Quanten sind anders“; Brian Greene: „Der Stoff, aus dem der Kosmos ist“; Dr. Dr. H.C. Hans Lueth: "Quantenphysik in der Nanowelt"; Prof. Lee Smolin: "Die Zukunft der Physik".

Prof. Des. J. Grossmann: Studies interdisciplinary compositions of colors, systematic color planning for creative and human environment, color/form relation; Prof. Dr. Franz Mairinger: Chemistry of colors, pigments and paint techniques; Dr. Hans Jürgen Scheuerle: Impact of colors in a room; Prof. Guenter Deutsch: Colors as information.

Prof. Dr. Eng. Dieter Lorenz: Human being and workplace; Dr. Bettina Rodek: Psychology of color and composition of colors in public rooms; Prof. Gerhard Meerwein: Colors and compositions of cityscapes; Dr. Herwig Lang: Physical science of colors; Dipl. Eng. Carl-Heinz Herbst: Light and Humans, Light as a tool; and many others.

== Works ==
Initially inspired by construction sites, coal mining and heavy industries, Perschel started to use architectural drawings as medium for her paintings. Over the decades she specialized in the knowledge of color compositions and the physical characteristics of lights to reach today the zone of quantum physics in modern art painting.

During many years Perschel devoted her time and artistic work to the subject of the interconnection of waves and particles. A combination of physical forms and a distinctive creative style that has influenced her paintings ever since.

Today, Perschel's work is far away from the artistic mainstream as her paintings succeed to fill a room with a mood and expression of art and science and facilitate an interconnection of matter and human beings. Her latest series of terra robusta paintings (2010) are currently exhibited in the Swiss art scene.

== Exhibitions ==
- 1988: Schloss Halbinsel Au – Switzerland
- 1989: Volksbank Köflach – Austria
- 1990: Galerie Adler, Rorbas – Switzerland
- 1990: Galerie GKB, Grazbach Galerie, Graz – Austria
- 1991: Gemeindegalerie Trofaiach – Austria
- 1991: Galerie du Relais, Horgen – Switzerland
- 1993: Galerie am Platz, Eglisau – Switzerland
- 1994: Digicomp AG, Zurich – Switzerland
- 1995: Kulturstiftung Sigristenkeller, Bülach – Switzerland
- 1997: Tan Gallery, Zurich – Switzerland
- 1998: 150 Jahre Schweizerische Bundesverfassung, Hochschule Wädenswil - Switzerland
- 1999: Tan Gallery, Zurich – Switzerland
- 2000: Galerie P’Art Claudine Hohl, Zurich – Switzerland
- 2001: Swiss Society Beijing - China
- 2002: Gottfried Keller Zentrum, Glattfelden – Switzerland
- 2003: Galerie für Gegenwartskunst, Bonstetten – Switzerland
- 2003: Galerie RW Fine Arts Collection Limited, Winterthur – Switzerland
- 2004: Galerie P’Art Claudine Hohl, Zurich – Switzerland
- 2005: Kunsthaus Köflach – Austria
- 2006: Private Gallery Maktoum Dubai - United Arab Emirates
- 2007: RW Fine Arts Collection, Winterthur – Switzerland
- 2007: Star Estates, Ulaanbaatar – Mongolia
- 2008: a la recherche du bonheur, Winterthur – Switzerland
- 2008: Galerie Catrina, Stäfa – Switzerland
- 2010: Hilton Cebu Resort & Spa, Cebu – Philippines
- 2010: Museum Bärengasse, Zurich – Switzerland
- 2011: Kunstetage Zurich – Switzerland
