= Unterpremstätten =

- Former municipality
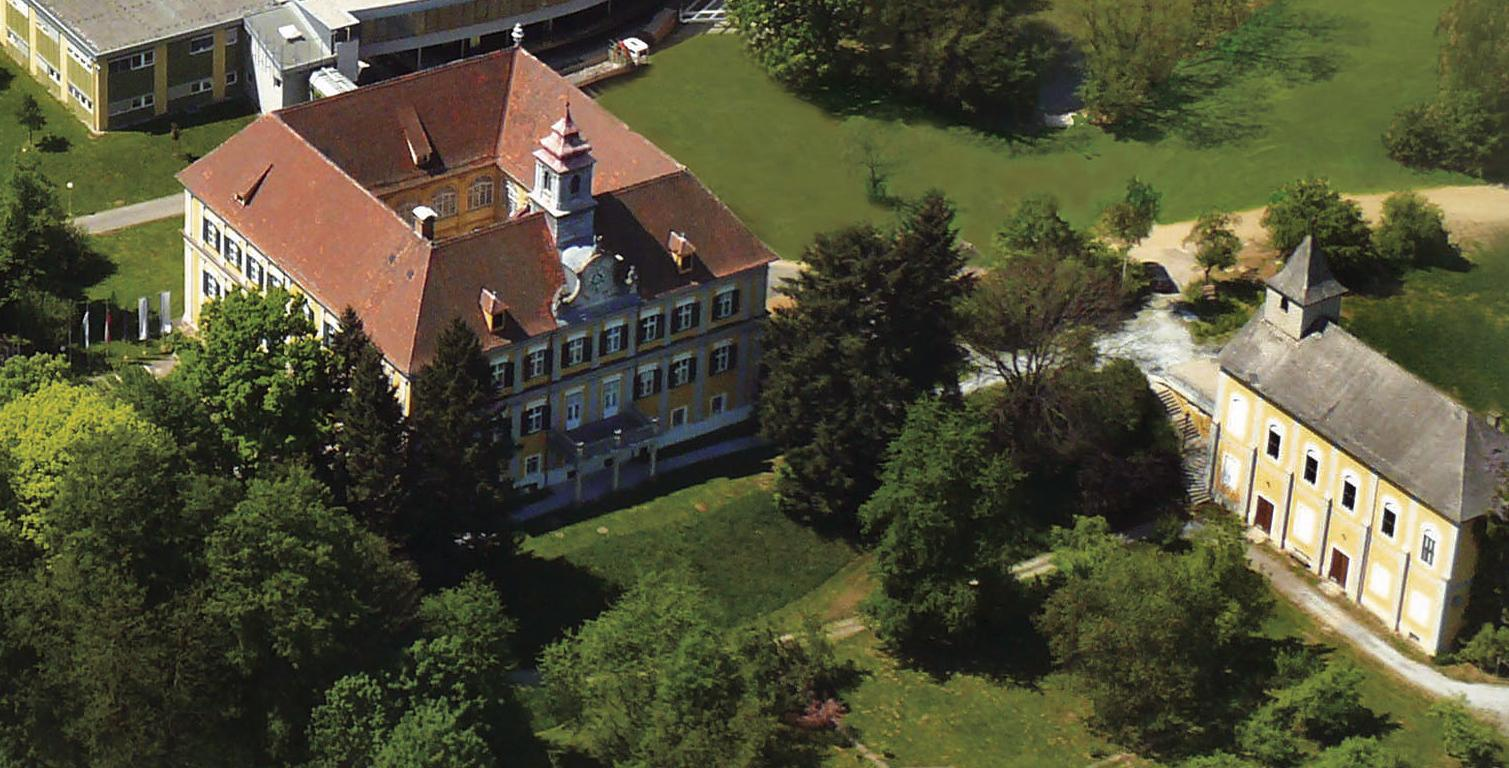
- Premstätten Castle and chapel

- Coat of arms

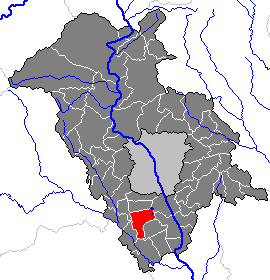
- Location within Graz-Umgebung district

- Location within Austria
- Coordinates: 46°57′53″N 15°24′15″E
- Country: Austria
- State: Styria
- District: Graz-Umgebung

Area
  - Total: 17.77 km^{2} (6.86 sq mi)
- Elevation: 351 m (1,152 ft)

Population (1 January 2016)
  - Total: 3,964
  - Density: 223.1/km^{2} (577.8/sq mi)
- Time zone: UTC+1 (CET)
  - Summer (DST): UTC+2 (CEST)
- Postal code: 8141
- Area code: 0 31 36
- Vehicle registration: GU
- Website: www.unterpremstaetten.at

Unterpremstätten is a former municipality in the district of Graz-Umgebung in the Austrian state of Styria. Since the 2015 Styria municipal structural reform, it is part of the municipality Premstätten.

AMS-Osram, formerly known as austriamicrosystems AG, is headquartered within Unterpremstätten.

== Population ==
Historical population
| Year | Pop. | ±% |
|---|---|---|
| 1869 | 949 | — |
| 1890 | 1,048 | +10.4% |
| 1900 | 1,098 | +4.8% |
| 1910 | 1,321 | +20.3% |
| 1923 | 1,246 | −5.7% |
| 1934 | 1,581 | +26.9% |
| 1939 | 1,661 | +5.1% |
| 1951 | 1,812 | +9.1% |
| 1961 | 1,966 | +8.5% |
| 1971 | 2,058 | +4.7% |
| 1981 | 2,129 | +3.4% |
| 1991 | 2,574 | +20.9% |
| 2001 | 3,188 | +23.9% |
| 2011 | 3,605 | +13.1% |
