= Zwaring-Pöls =

- Former municipality
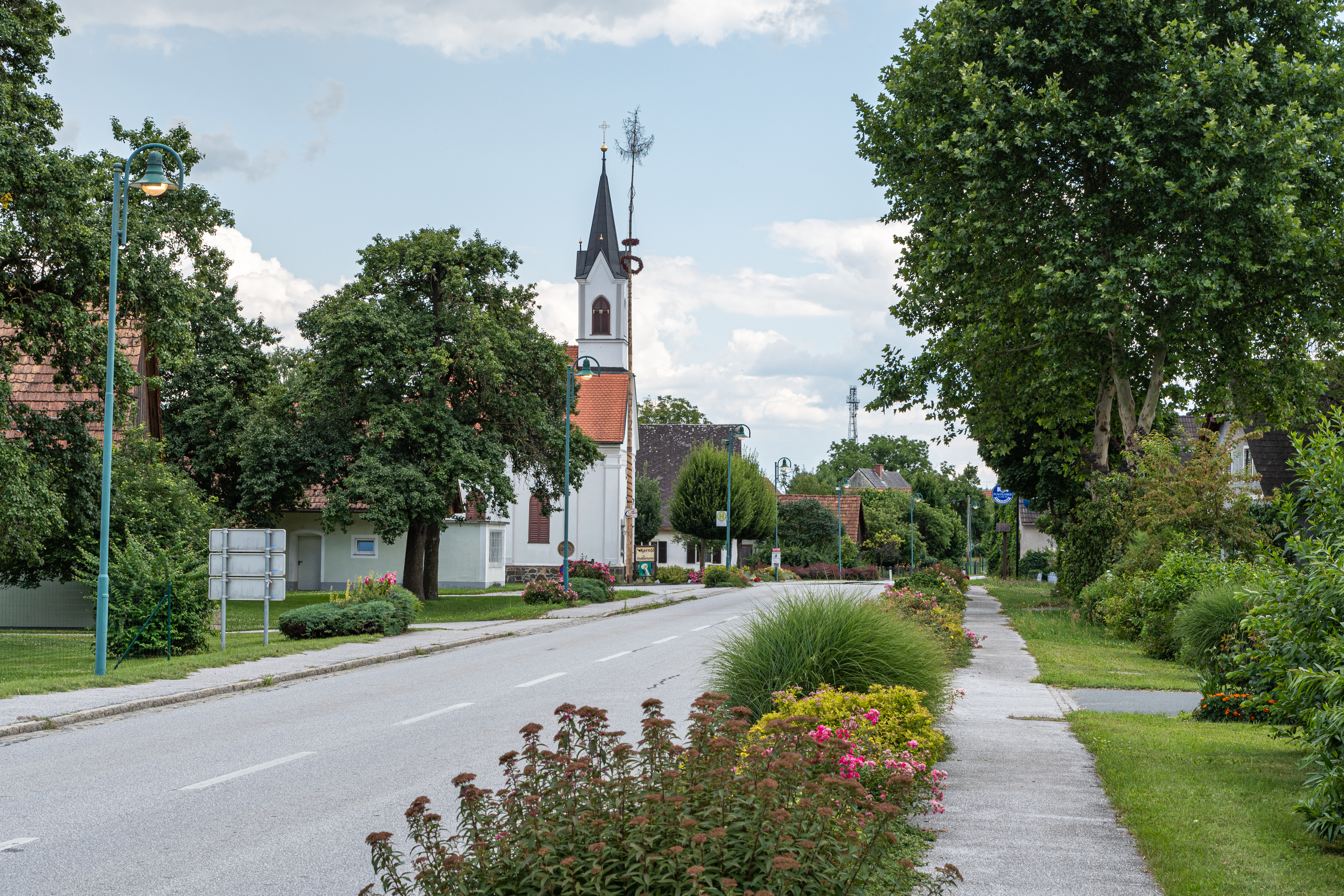
- Zwaring

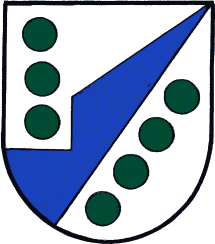
- Coat of arms

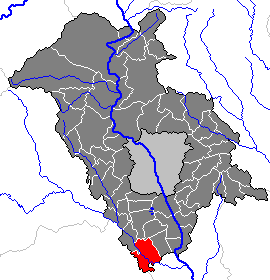
- Location within Graz-Umgebung district

- Location within Austria
- Coordinates: 46°54′37″N 15°24′46″E
- Country: Austria
- State: Styria
- District: Graz-Umgebung

Area
  - Total: 23.98 km^{2} (9.26 sq mi)
- Elevation: 312 m (1,024 ft)

Population (2014-01-01)
  - Total: 1,552
  - Density: 64.72/km^{2} (167.6/sq mi)
- Time zone: UTC+1 (CET)
  - Summer (DST): UTC+2 (CEST)
- Postal code: 8142, 8504
- Area code: 03136
- Vehicle registration: GU
- Website: www.zwaring-poels.at

Zwaring-Pöls was a municipality in Austria which merged in January 2015 into Dobl-Zwaring in the Graz-Umgebung District of Styria, Austria.

== Population ==
Historical population
Year	Pop.	±%
1869	1,243	—
1880	1,264	+1.7%
1890	1,274	+0.8%
1900	1,207	−5.3%
1910	1,211	+0.3%
1923	1,204	−0.6%
1934	1,212	+0.7%
1939	1,351	+11.5%
1951	1,189	−12.0%
1961	1,114	−6.3%
1971	1,222	+9.7%
1981	1,281	+4.8%
1991	1,348	+5.2%
2001	1,363	+1.1%
2007	1,497	+9.8%
2014	1,552	+3.7%
