= Kainach (Mur) =

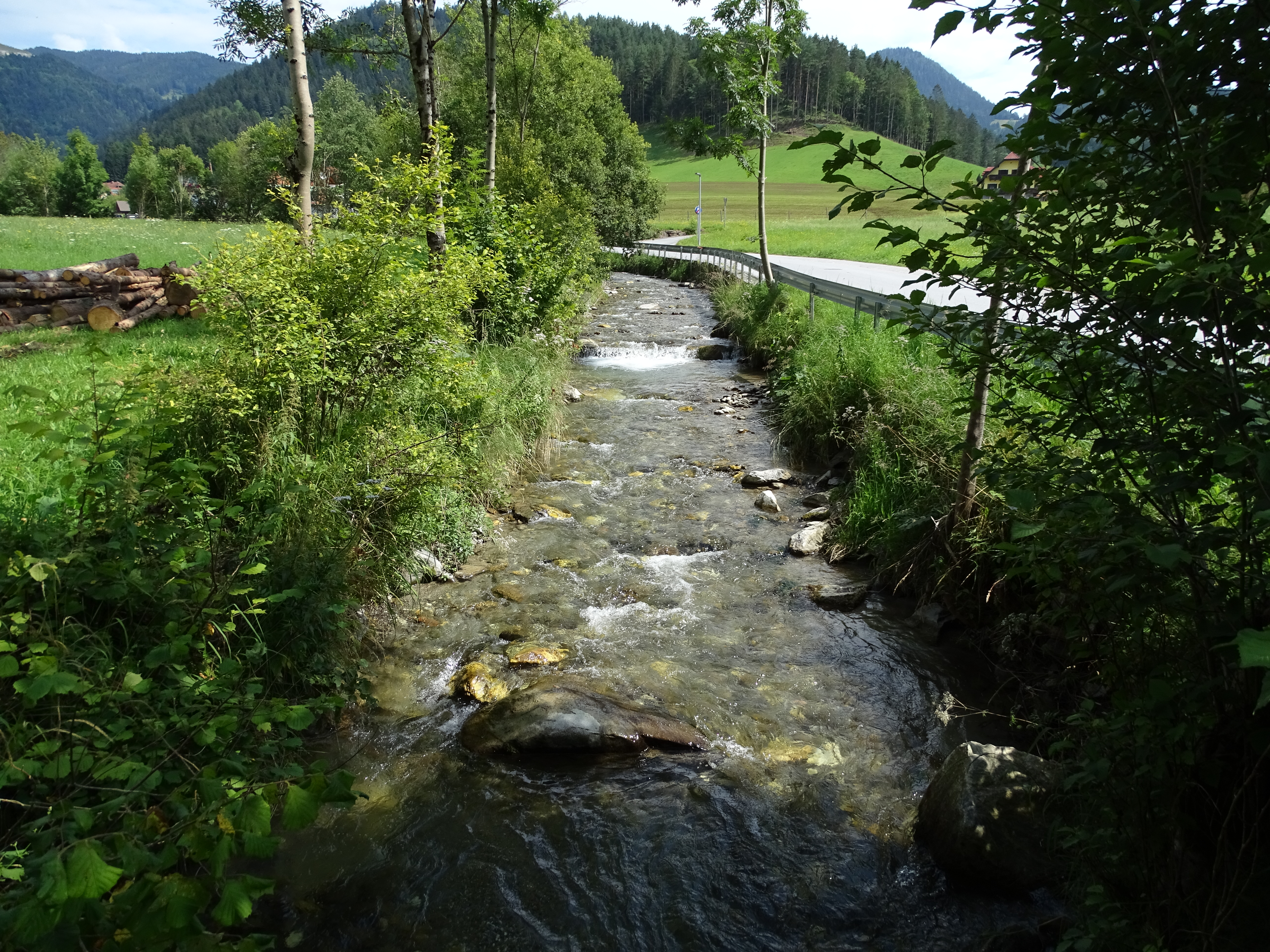
- The Kainach at Gallmannsegg

Location
- Country: Austria
- State: Styria

Physical characteristics
- Mouth
  - location: Mur
  - coordinates: 46.8869°N 15.5177°E
- Length: 65.3 km (40.6 mi)
- Basin size: 852 km^{2} (329 sq mi)

Basin features
- Progression: Mur→ Drava→ Danube→ Black Sea

Kainach is a river of Styria, Austria. It is a right tributary of the Mur in Wildon. Its drainage basin is 852 km^{2} (329 sq mi).
