= Styria S-Bahn =

Ongoing rail project in Styria, Austria

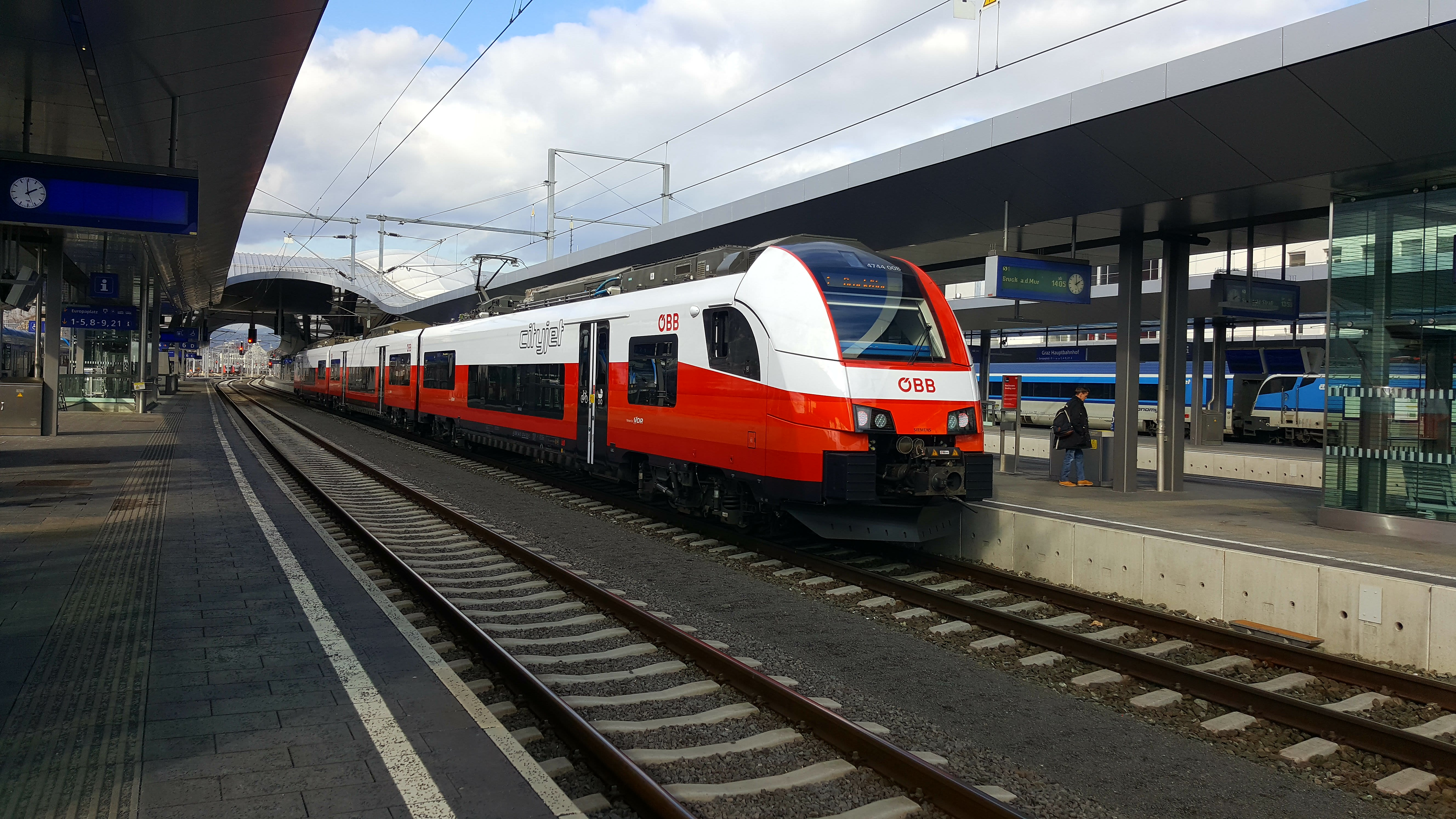
ÖBB S-Bahn train on als S1 in Graz Hauptbahnhof

The Styria S-Bahn (German: S-Bahn Steiermark), initially also known as "Graz S-Bahn", is a local transport project that connects the metropolitan area of Graz and the central region of Upper Styria of the Austrian state of Styria. This project has been working since 1998. Commissioning took place on 9 December 2007.

Completion is scheduled for 2026. In the future, the S-Bahn should provide better connections in 15- or 30-minute intervals as well as air-conditioned and low-floor trains. In 2017, for example, there is an hourly train every sunday between the airport and the city of Graz. The 30-minute clock is maintained by the regional bus service. The attractiveness of rail transport has significantly increased passenger numbers, which is in line with the goal of counteracting the increase in motorized private transport with public transport.

== Lines ==
Route map of S-Bahn Steiermark and other Styrian rail lines

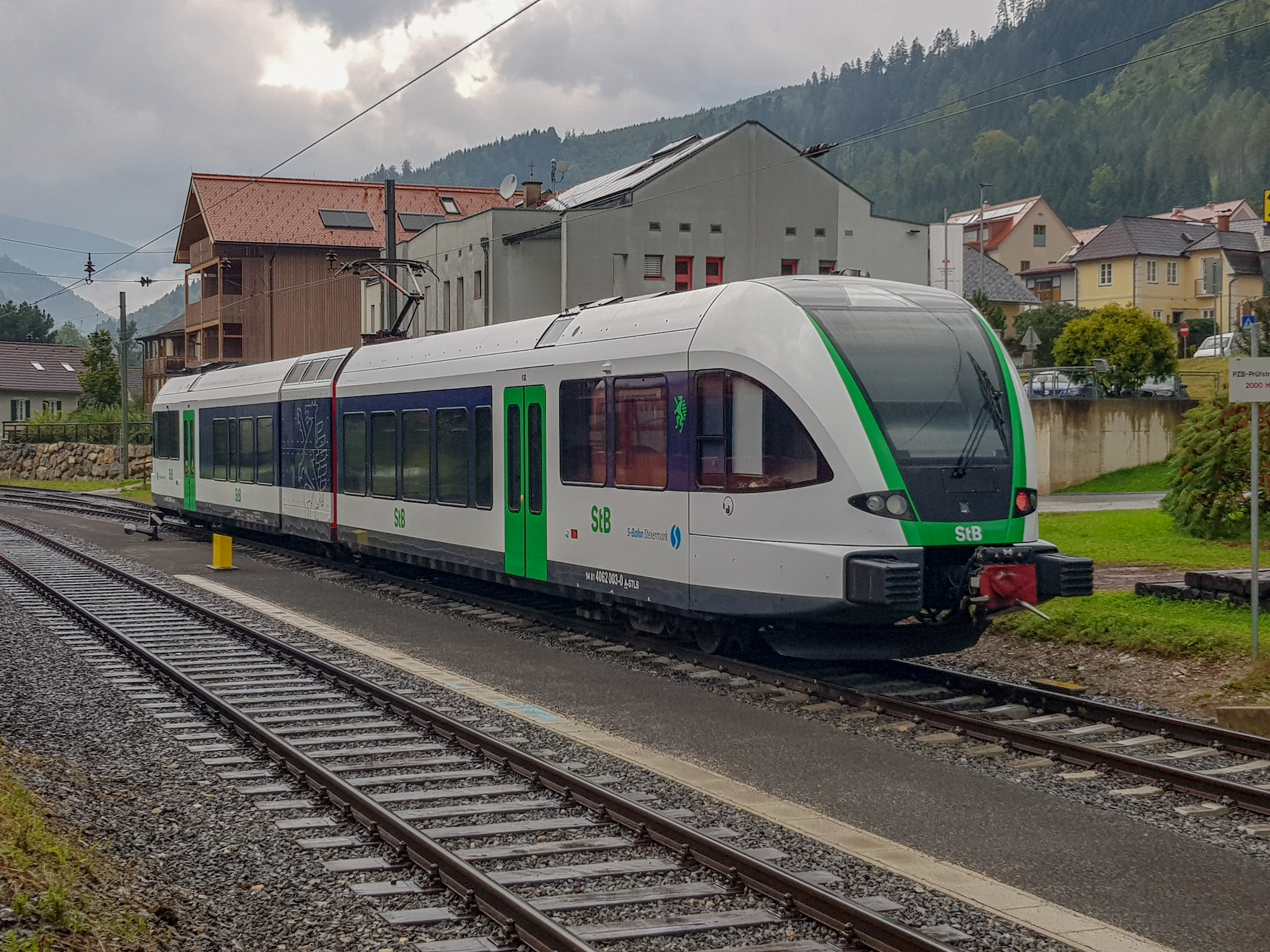
StB S-Bahn train on S11 in Übelbach

Line	Route	Operating company	Start date
Styria S-Bahn	Graz — Peggau — Frohnleiten — Bruck an der Mur	ÖBB	9 December 2007
Styria S-Bahn	(Graz) — Peggau-Deutschfeistritz — Deutschfeistritz — Übelbach	StB	9 December 2007
Styria S-Bahn	Graz — Gleisdorf — Feldbach — Fehring	ÖBB	12 December 2010
Styria S-Bahn	(Graz) — Gleisdorf — Weiz	StB	12 December 2010
Styria S-Bahn	Graz — Leibnitz - Spielfeld-Straß	ÖBB	9 December 2007
Styria S-Bahn	(Graz) — Spielfeld-Straß — Bad Radkersburg	ÖBB	9 December 2007
Styria S-Bahn	Graz — Werndorf — Wies-Eibiswald (*)	GKB	12 December 2010
Styria S-Bahn	Graz — Lieboch — Wies-Eibiswald (*)	GKB	9 December 2007 (Note: Part of the S6 until 11 December 2010)
Styria S-Bahn	Graz — Lieboch — Köflach	GKB	9 December 2007
Styria S-Bahn	Unzmarkt — Leoben — Bruck an der Mur	ÖBB	11 December 2016
Styria S-Bahn	Bruck an der Mur — Kapfenberg — Mürzzuschlag	ÖBB	11 December 2016

== Future extension ==
There are plans to extend the lines {S6 and S61 to Eibiswald and to electrify the routes of the S6, S7 and S61. Due to the construction of the Koralmbahn, an underground line including a tunnel station at Graz Airport.
