= Graz Hauptbahnhof =

Railway station in Styria, Austria

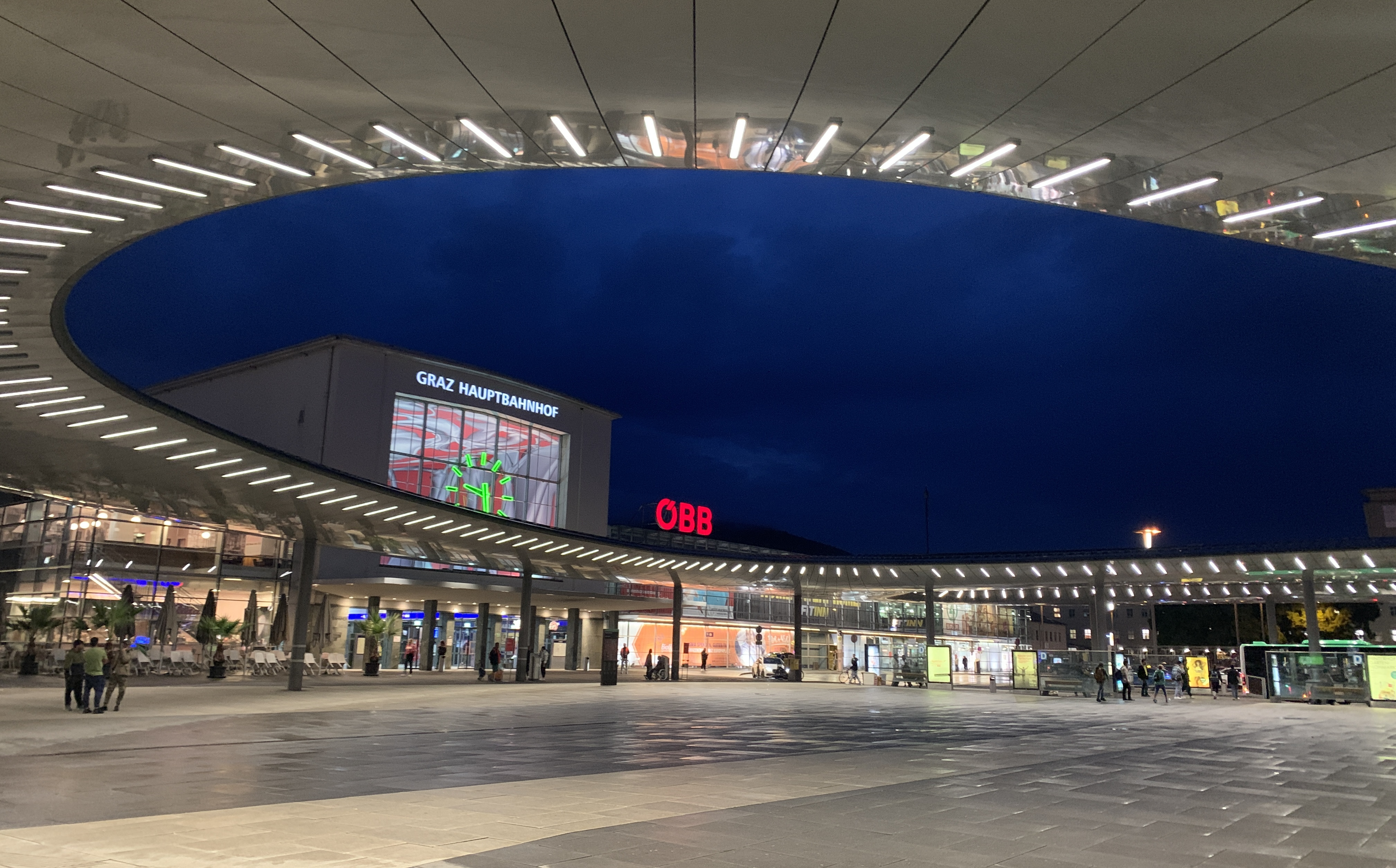
- Graz Central Station at nighttime

General information
- Other names: Graz Main Station; Graz Central Station
- Location: Europaplatz; 8020 Graz; Austria
- Coordinates: 47°4′20″N 15°25′2″E
- Owner: Austrian Federal Railways (ÖBB)
- Operator: ÖBB Infra
- Lines: Köflach railway line; Koralm railway line; Southern railway line; Styrian Eastern railway line
- Distance: 40.2 kilometres (25.0 mi) from Köflach; 211.4 kilometres (131.4 mi) from Wien Hauptbahnhof; 250.7 kilometres (155.8 mi) from Győr
- Platforms: 1 side platform; 4 island platforms
- Tracks: 9
- Connections: Tram: Graz trams; Bus: Local and regional and international

Construction
- Architect: Wilhelm Aduatz (1956)

Other information
- IATA code: GGZ

History
- Opened: 1847
- Rebuilt: 1876 and 1956
Services
Preceding station	ÖBB	Following station
Terminus	Railjet	Bruck an der Mur towards Berlin-Charlottenburg
Terminus	Railjet	Bruck an der Mur towards Praha hl.n.
Terminus	Railjet	Bruck an der Mur towards Vienna Airport
Terminus	EuroCity	Bruck an der Mur towards Przemyśl Główny
Leibnitz towards Trieste Centrale	EuroCity	Bruck an der Mur towards Wien Hbf
Leibnitz towards Zagreb Glavni kolodvor	EuroCity	Bruck an der Mur towards Wien Hbf
Leoben towards Zürich HB	EuroCity (Transalpin)	Terminus
Terminus	InterCity	Graz Ostbahnhof-Messe towards Budapest Keleti
Leibnitz towards Ljubljana	InterCity	Graz Ostbahnhof-Messe towards Budapest Keleti
Leoben towards Innsbruck Hbf	InterCity	Terminus
Leoben towards Linz Hbf	InterCity	Terminus
Leoben towards Salzburg Hbf	InterCity	Terminus
Terminus	EuroNight	Bruck an der Mur towards Warszawa Wschodnia
Terminus	Nightjet	Bruck an der Mur towards Berlin-Charlottenburg or Warszawa Wschodnia
Bruck an der Mur towards Zürich HB	Nightjet	Terminus
Preceding station	DB Fernverkehr	Following station
Klagenfurt Hbf towards Frankfurt (Main) Hbf or Münster Hbf	ICE 62	Terminus
Preceding station	Styria S-Bahn	Following station
Judendorf-Straßengel towards Bruck an der Mur	S1	Terminus
Judendorf-Straßengel towards Übelbach	S11	Terminus
Terminus	S3	Graz Don Bosco towards Fehring
Terminus	S31	Graz Don Bosco towards Weiz
Terminus	S5	Graz Don Bosco towards Spielfeld-Straß
Graz Don Bosco towards Wies-Eibiswald	S6	Terminus
Graz Köflacher towards Wies-Eibiswald	S6	Terminus
Graz Köflacher towards Köflach	S7	Terminus
Location
- Location within Styria Location within Austria Location within Europe

Graz Hauptbahnhof, abbreviated Graz Hbf (German for Graz Main Station; sometimes translated as Graz Central Station), is the main railway station in Graz, the capital of the Austrian federal state Styria. The station is located some 2 kilometres (1.2 mi) west of the city centre, to which it is connected by tram. It is the most frequented railway station in Austria, outside of Vienna.

The station serves as a major node on the Southern Railway, which links it to Vienna in the north, and Slovenia in the south. It is also the terminus of the Styrian Eastern railway line, which runs eastwards towards Hungary, and of the local Köflach railway line to the west. In the future, the Koralm Railway will provide a direct link from Graz to Italy via Klagenfurt.

== History ==
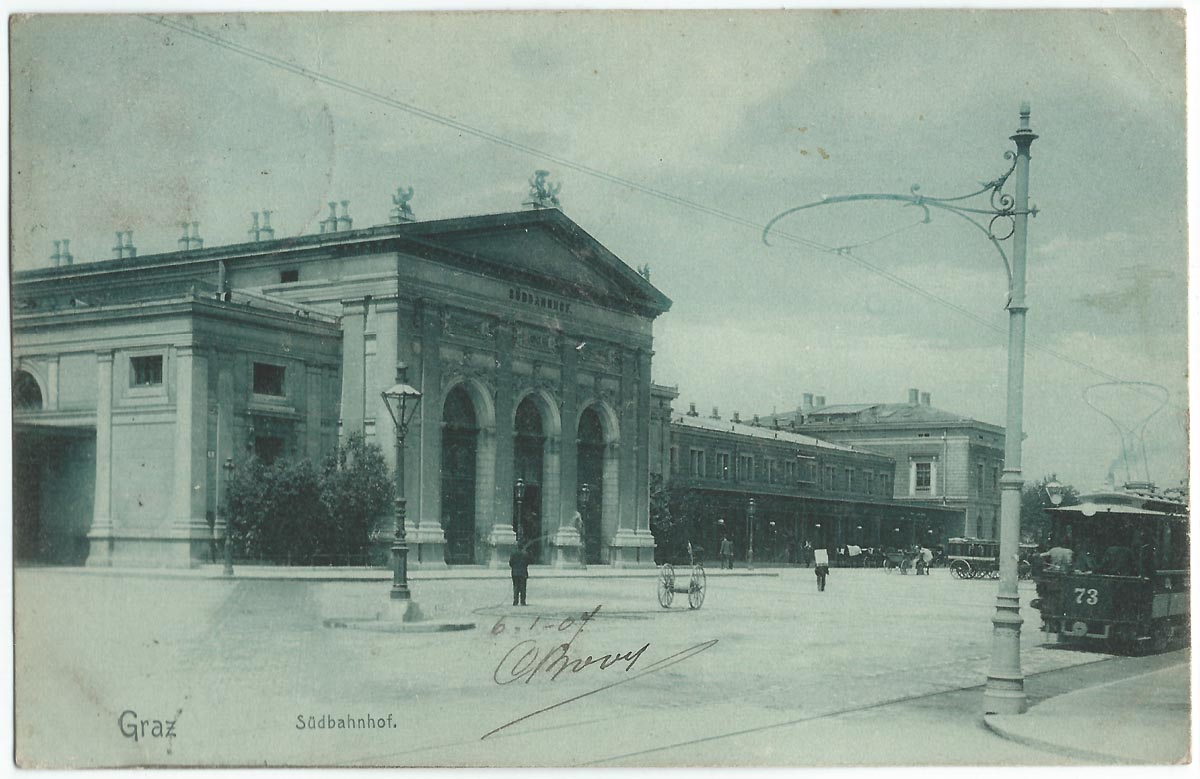
Original station from 1876 (destroyed in 1945)

The first railway station was opened here in 1847 and due to an increase in passenger numbers a larger station was constructed on the same site between 1871 and 1876.

In 1945 the railway station from 1876 was totally destroyed in allied bombing raids. In 1956 the construction of the current station was completed. The station was built in the typical style of the 1950s and the main ticket hall is now a listed building.

In 2001 the station was modernised and partly rebuilt to incorporate escalators to the platforms and also a small shopping mall.

== Project Hauptbahnhof 2020 ==
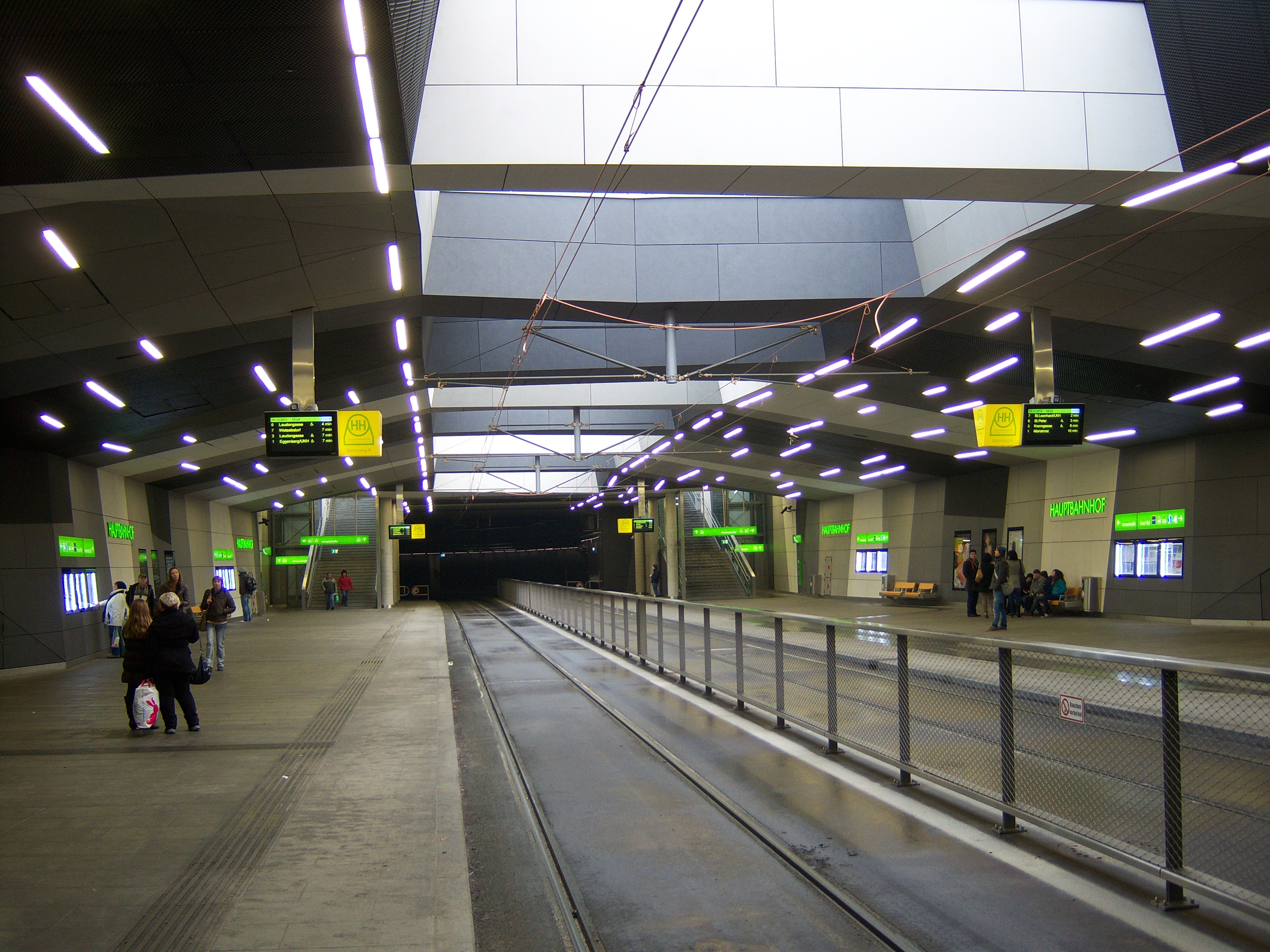
New subsurface tram stop at the Hauptbahnhof

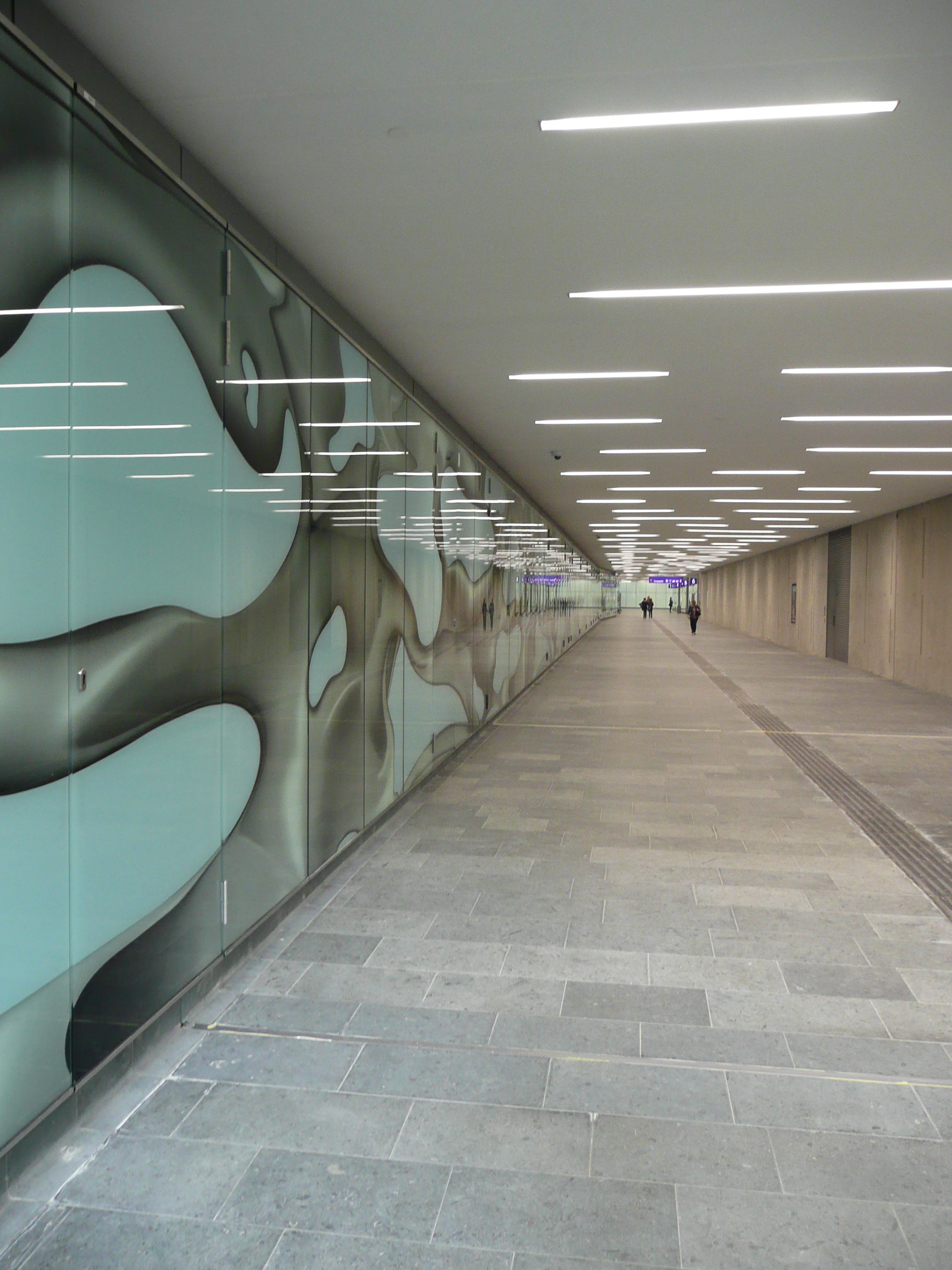
New pedestrian tunnel to Wagner Biro Straße

Since 2010 the station has been adapted for its new role as an international transport hub and to cope with increasing national and regional traffic. When the construction of the Koralm Railway is completed all international traffic from Vienna to Italy will pass through Graz.

This includes rebuilding and lengthening all platforms and the construction of two extra platforms for regional trains. All platforms have new, modern roofing.

One of the two pedestrian tunnels to the platforms has been extended to the Wagner Biro Straße giving access to the station from the west as well.

The railway bridge over the Eggenberger Straße has also been rebuilt to make room for extra tracks.

A new local transport hub for trams and buses has been built on and under the station forecourt to connect four tram lines to the station. Up until recently two of these tramlines used to terminate on the station forecourt while the other two passed the station nearby. To rectify this problem a new subsurface tram stop was built under the station forecourt, enabling all four tram lines to stop outside the main entrance of the station.

== Layout ==
Graz Hauptbahnhof has five platforms serving nine tracks.

== Train services ==
The station is served by the following services:

- RailJet services: Graz - Vienna - Břeclav - Brno - Pardubice - Prague
- EuroCity services: Zagreb - Maribor - Graz - Vienna

== See also ==
- Rail transport in Austria
