= Köflach =

City in Styria, Austria

- Municipality
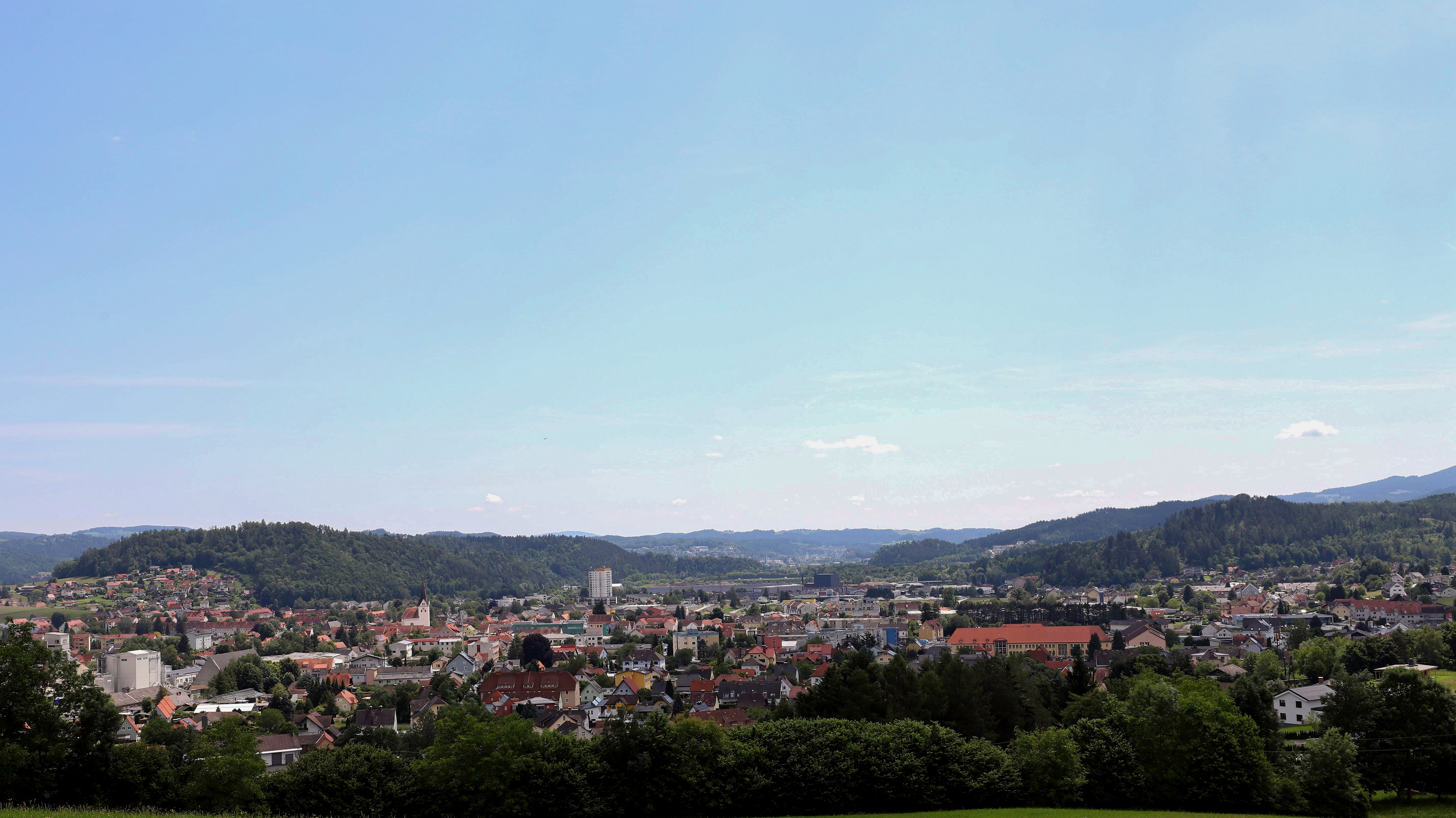
- Köflach seen from the west

- Coat of arms

- Location within Austria
- Coordinates: 47°04′N 15°05′E
- Country: Austria
- State: Styria
- District: Voitsberg

Government
  - Mayor: Mag. Helmut Linhart (ÖVP)

Area
  - Total: 43.07 km^{2} (16.63 sq mi)
- Elevation: 449 m (1,473 ft)

Population (2018-01-01)
  - Total: 9,888
  - Density: 229.6/km^{2} (594.6/sq mi)
- Time zone: UTC+1 (CET)
  - Summer (DST): UTC+2 (CEST)
- Postal code: A-8580
- Area code: 61609
- Website: www.koeflach.at

Köflach is a small city in the district of Voitsberg in the Austrian state of Styria, at the foot of the Stubalpe mountain. The town has a federal stud in the village of Piber that supplies the Lipizzaner horses to the famous Spanish Riding School in Vienna. Traditionally known for its coal mining, Köflach is slowly changing from an industrial town to a center of the service sector. It is connected by rail to Voitsberg.

== Population ==
Historical population
Year	Pop.	±%
1869	3,474	—
1880	5,507	+58.5%
1890	6,900	+25.3%
1900	7,131	+3.3%
1910	6,564	−8.0%
1923	7,288	+11.0%
1934	7,742	+6.2%
1939	8,044	+3.9%
1951	11,321	+40.7%
1961	12,658	+11.8%
1971	12,629	−0.2%
1981	12,055	−4.5%
1991	11,276	−6.5%
2001	10,671	−5.4%
2011	9,757	−8.6%
2014	9,567	−1.9%

== Sights ==
The main attractions are "Bundesgestüt Piber" (Piber Federal Stud) with its famous white Lipizzaner horses and the thermal bath "Therme Nova" which is supplied from mineral spring in Piber.

Also a point of interest is the House of Art and Culture which holds exhibitions, mostly of local artists.

== Infrastructure ==
Köflach has a small train station, it is the terminus of the railway line between Köflach and Graz. It is served by the suburban rail line S7. The operator is GKB.

The nearest Autobahn (Freeway) is the "A2 Südautobahn", the nearest connections are "Modriach" and "Mooskirchen". The most important Roads are the "B70 Packerbundesstraße" connecting Köflach with Graz and Villach and the "B77 Gaberl Straße".

== Economy ==
The important industrial sites are Stölzle Oberglas, producer of glass, and LEAR, producer of car seats (especially for Magna Steyr).

== Twin towns ==
- Giengen an der Brenz, Germany, since 1962

== Sons and daughters ==
- Ferdinand Pamberger (1873-1956), painter and graphic artist
- Hannah Perschel (born 1940), artist
- Stefanie Werger (born 1951), musician, author and actress
- Leo Lukas (born 1959), cabaret artist and writer
- Hannah Scheucher (born 1993), graphic designer
- Edmund Dittmer (born 1956), wine friend
- Hubert Eisner (born 1897-?), Austrian Nazi

== Other members of the community history ==
- Viktor Elser (1893-1979), national politician, national councilor of the council (mayor of 1924-1934)
- Anton Lukesch (1912-2003) and Karl Lukesch (1917-1991), missionaries and South American researchers

== See also ==
- Green Boots
