= List of Knight's Cross of the Iron Cross recipients (W) =

The Knight's Cross of the Iron Cross (German: Ritterkreuz des Eisernen Kreuzes) and its variants were the highest awards in the military and paramilitary forces of Nazi Germany during World War II. The Knight's Cross of the Iron Cross was awarded for a wide range of reasons and across all ranks, from a senior commander for skilled leadership of his troops in battle to a low-ranking soldier for a single act of extreme gallantry. A total of 7,321 awards were made between its first presentation on 30 September 1939 and its last bestowal on 17 June 1945. (Note: Großadmiral and President of Germany Karl Dönitz, Hitler's successor as Head of State (Staatsoberhaupt) and Supreme Commander of the Armed Forces, had ordered the cessation of all promotions and awards as of 11 May 1945 (Dönitz-decree). Consequently the last Knight's Cross awarded to Oberleutnant zur See of the Reserves Georg-Wolfgang Feller on 17 June 1945 must therefore be considered a de facto but not de jure hand-out.) This number is based on the analysis and acceptance of the order commission of the Association of Knight's Cross Recipients (AKCR). Presentations were made to members of the three military branches of the Wehrmacht—the Heer (Army), Kriegsmarine (Navy) and Luftwaffe (Air Force)—as well as the Waffen-SS, the Reichsarbeitsdienst (RAD—Reich Labour Service) and the Volkssturm (German national militia). There were also 43 recipients in the military forces of allies of the Third Reich.

These recipients are listed in the 1986 edition of Walther-Peer Fellgiebel's book, Die Träger des Ritterkreuzes des Eisernen Kreuzes 1939–1945 [The Bearers of the Knight's Cross of the Iron Cross 1939–1945]. Fellgiebel was the former chairman and head of the order commission of the AKCR. In 1996, the second edition of this book was published with an addendum delisting 11 of these original recipients. Author Veit Scherzer has cast doubt on a further 193 of these listings. The majority of the disputed recipients had been nominated for the award in 1945, when the deteriorating situation of Germany during the final days of World War II left a number of nominations incomplete and pending in various stages of the approval process.

Listed here are the 446 Knight's Cross recipients of the Wehrmacht and Waffen-SS whose last name starts with "W". Scherzer has challenged the validity of 11 of these listings. The recipients are initially ordered alphabetically by last name. The rank listed is the recipient's rank at the time the Knight's Cross was awarded.

== Background ==
The Knight's Cross of the Iron Cross and its higher grades were based on four separate enactments. The first enactment, Reichsgesetzblatt I S. 1573 of 1 September 1939 instituted the Iron Cross (Eisernes Kreuz), the Knight's Cross of the Iron Cross and the Grand Cross of the Iron Cross (Großkreuz des Eisernen Kreuzes). Article 2 of the enactment mandated that the award of a higher class be preceded by the award of all preceding classes. As the war progressed, some of the recipients of the Knight's Cross distinguished themselves further and a higher grade, the Knight's Cross of the Iron Cross with Oak Leaves (Ritterkreuz des Eisernen Kreuzes mit Eichenlaub), was instituted. The Oak Leaves, as they were commonly referred to, were based on the enactment Reichsgesetzblatt I S. 849 of 3 June 1940. In 1941, two higher grades of the Knight's Cross were instituted. The enactment Reichsgesetzblatt I S. 613 of 28 September 1941 introduced the Knight's Cross of the Iron Cross with Oak Leaves and Swords (Ritterkreuz des Eisernen Kreuzes mit Eichenlaub und Schwertern) and the Knight's Cross of the Iron Cross with Oak Leaves, Swords and Diamonds (Ritterkreuz des Eisernen Kreuzes mit Eichenlaub, Schwertern und Brillanten). At the end of 1944 the final grade, the Knight's Cross of the Iron Cross with Golden Oak Leaves, Swords, and Diamonds (Ritterkreuz des Eisernen Kreuzes mit goldenem Eichenlaub, Schwertern und Brillanten), based on the enactment Reichsgesetzblatt 1945 I S. 11 of 29 December 1944, became the final variant of the Knight's Cross authorized.

== Recipients ==
Knight's Cross of the Iron Cross (W)
Service	Number of presentations	Posthumous presentations
Heer	307	30
Kriegsmarine	22	2
Luftwaffe	92	7
Waffen-SS	25	2

The Oberkommando der Wehrmacht (Supreme Command of the Armed Forces) kept separate Knight's Cross lists for the Heer (Army), Kriegsmarine (Navy), Luftwaffe (Air Force) and Waffen-SS. Within each of these lists a unique sequential number was assigned to each recipient. The same numbering paradigm was applied to the higher grades of the Knight's Cross, one list per grade. Of the 446 awards made to servicemen whose last name starts with "W", 46 were later awarded the Knight's Cross of the Iron Cross with Oak Leaves and 11 the Knight's Cross of the Iron Cross with Oak Leaves and Swords; 41 presentations were made posthumously. Heer members received 307 of the medals; 22 went to the Kriegsmarine, 92 to the Luftwaffe, and 25 to the Waffen-SS. The sequential numbers greater than 843 for the Knight's Cross of the Iron Cross with Oak Leaves and 143 for the Knight's Cross of the Iron Cross with Oak Leaves and Swords are unofficial and were assigned by the Association of Knight's Cross Recipients (AKCR) and are therefore denoted in parentheses.

This along with the + (plus) indicates that a higher grade of Knight's Cross was awarded as well.
This along with the * (asterisk) indicates that the Knight's Cross was awarded posthumously.
This along with the ? (question mark) indicates that author Veit Scherzer has expressed doubt regarding the veracity and formal correctness of the listing.

Name	Service	Rank	Role and unit (Note: For an explanation of the various naming schemes used by the Luftwaffe, Heer, Kriegsmarine and Waffen-SS refer to nomenclature used by the Wehrmacht and Waffen-SS.)	Date of award	Notes	Image
Franz Wabro	Heer	Unteroffizier	Group leader in the Stabskompanie/Grenadier-Regiment 534	4 July 1944	—	—
Friedrich Wachowiak	Luftwaffe	Unteroffizier	Pilot in the III./Jagdgeschwader 52 (Note: According to Scherzer as pilot in the 8./Jagdgeschwader 52.)	5 April 1942	—	—
Hans Wack	Heer	Hauptmann	Commander of the II./Infanterie-Regiment 485	23 October 1941	—	—
Rudolf Wätjen	Heer	Major	Commander of Panzer-Aufklärungs-Abteilung "Großdeutschland"	14 April 1943	—	—
Carl Wagener	Heer	Oberst im Generalstab (in the General Staff)	Chief of the general staff of the 1. Panzerarmee	14 May 1944	—	
Dr. Otto Wagener? (Note: The Knight's Cross presentation to Otto Wagener was unlawfully made by the Dönitz Government after 8 May 1945. This can be verified by documented radio communication dated on 21 May 1945. The presentation date was backdated by Walther-Peer Fellgiebel.)	Heer	Generalmajor	Commander Division Insel Rhodos	5 May 1945	—	—
Ludwig Wagenfeld	Luftwaffe	Hauptmann	Staffelkapitän of the 3.(F)/Aufklärungs-Gruppe 122 (Note: According to Scherzer as Staffelkapitän of the Aufklärungsstaffel 3.(F)/122.)	24 March 1943	—	—
Edmund Wagner	Luftwaffe	Oberfeldwebel	Pilot in the 9./Jagdgeschwader 51	17 November 1941*	Killed in action 13 November 1941	—
Erich Wagner	Heer	Obergefreiter	Geschützführer (gun layer) in the 16./Jäger-Regiment 38	23 August 1943	—	—
Ferdinand Wagner	Heer	Unteroffizier	Rifle leader in the 4./Grenadier-Regiment 32	12 December 1944	—	—
Gustav Wagner	Heer	Oberst	Commander of Infanterie-Regiment 44	14 December 1941	—	A man wearing a military uniform.
Hans Wagner	Heer	Oberst	Commander of Artillerie-Regiment 5	18 April 1943	—	—
Hans-Joachim Wagner	Heer	Hauptmann of the Reserves	Chief of the Stabsbatterie/Sturmgeschütz-Brigade 286	25 January 1945	—	—
Heinz Wagner	Heer	Leutnant of the Reserves	Zugführer (platoon leader) in the Kradschützen-Bataillon 6	24 January 1943	—	—
Helmut Wagner	Luftwaffe	Leutnant	Zugführer (platoon leader) in the 6./Fallschirmjäger-Regiment 1	24 January 1942	—	—
Helmut Wagner	Heer	Hauptmann of the Reserves	Commander of the I./Grenadier-Regiment 431 (Note: According to Scherzer as leader of the I./Grenadier-Regiment 431.)	9 December 1944	—	—
Herbert Wagner	Heer	Generalleutnant	Commander of the 132. Infanterie-Division	23 October 1944	—	—
Josef Wagner	Heer	Oberleutnant	Chief of the 1./Jäger-Regiment 227	18 February 1945	—	—
Jürgen Wagner+	Waffen-SS	SS-Oberführer	Commander of SS-Panzergrenadier-Regiment 9 "Germania" (Note: According to Scherzer as commander of SS-Panzergrenadier-Regiment "Germania".)	24 July 1943	Awarded 680th Oak Leaves 11 December 1944	
Klaus Wagner	Heer	Oberleutnant	Leader of the 3./Sturmgeschütz-Abteilung 667	4 September 1942	—	—
Rudolf Wagner	Luftwaffe	Leutnant	Pilot in the 12./Jagdgeschwader 51 "Mölders" (Note: According to Scherzer as pilot in the 10./Jagdgeschwader 51 "Mölders".)	26 March 1944	Missing in action 11 December 1943	—
Werner Wagner	Heer	Oberleutnant	Chief of the 3./Panzer-Jäger-Lehr-Abteilung 130	14 April 1945	—	—
Wilhelm Wagner	Heer	Major	Commander of the II./Artillerie-Regiment 158	11 April 1944	—	—
Willi Wagner	Heer	Oberwachtmeister	Zugführer (platoon leader) in the 3./Heeres-Küsten-Artillerie-Abteilung 789	17 May 1943	—	—
Dietmar Wahl	Heer	Major	Commander of the I./Grenadier-Regiment 282	29 August 1943* (Note: According to Scherzer on 27 August 1943.)	Died of wounds 13 August 1943	—
Ernst Wahl	Heer	Unteroffizier	Zugführer (platoon leader) in the 2./Pionier-Bataillon 389	17 September 1944	—	—
Hans Wahl	Heer	Oberleutnant of the Reserves (Note: According to Scherzer as Leutnant of the Reserves.)	Leader of the 3./Grenadier-Regiment 23	26 March 1944	—	—
Kurt Wahl+	Waffen-SS	SS-Hauptsturmführer	Leader of a Kampfgruppe in SS-Panzergrenadier-Regiment 38 "Götz von Berlichingen" (Note: According to Scherzer as adjutant in SS-Panzergreadier-Regiment 38 and leader of a Kampfgruppe.)	23 August 1944	Awarded 720th Oak Leaves 1 February 1945	—
Wolfgang Wahl	Heer	Hauptmann	Commander of the II./Panzer-Regiment 8	6 January 1942	—	—
Helmut Waldecker	Luftwaffe	Hauptmann	Staffelkapitän in the I./Kampfgeschwader 6 (Note: According to Scherzer as Staffelkapitän of the 6./Kampfgeschwader 6.)	22 November 1943	—	—
Bruno Walden	Waffen-SS	Major of the Schupo	Commander of the III./SS-Polizei-Regiment 2	18 January 1945	—	—
Siegfried von Waldenburg	Heer	Oberst	Leader of the 116. Panzer-Division	9 December 1944	—	A man wearing a military uniform, peaked cap and neck order in the shape of a cross.
Rudolf Freiherr von Waldenfels+	Heer	Oberst (Note: According to Scherzer as Oberstleutnant.)	Commander of Schützen-Regiment 4	11 October 1941	Awarded 476th Oak Leaves 14 May 1944	—
Johann Waldhauser	Luftwaffe	Oberleutnant (Note: According to Scherzer as Oberleutnant of the Reserves.)	Staffelkapitän of the 9./Sturzkampfgeschwader 77	24 January 1942	—	—
Hans Waldmann	Luftwaffe	Feldwebel	Pilot in the 6./Jagdgeschwader 52	5 February 1944	—	—
Hans Waldmüller	Waffen-SS	SS-Sturmbannführer	Commander of the I./SS-Panzergrenadier-Regiment 25 "Hitlerjugend" (Note: According to Scherzer as commander of the I./SS-Panzergrenadier-Regiment 25.)	27 August 1944	—	—
Franz Waldner	Heer	Obergefreiter	Richtschütze (gunner) in the 2./schwere Panzer-Jäger-Abteilung 655	12 August 1944	—	—
Hermann Waldow	Heer	Oberleutnant	Chief of Panzerspäh-Kompanie 700 (Note: According to Scherzer as chief of Panzerspäh-Kompanie 700/Panzer-Verband 700.)	30 January 1943	—	—
Gustav Walle? (Note: Gustav Walle's nomination by the troop, OB Nordwest, was received by Heerespersonalamt-Außenstelle (HPA/A—Branch of the Army Staff Office) as teleprinter message on 2 May 1945 at 17:00, indicating that he had destroyed nine enemy tanks with a Panzerfaust. A Heerespersonalamt-Außenstelle-Verleihungsvorschlag (HPA/A-VV—Branch of the Army Staff Office Nomination Recommendation) was not created. The person in charge, Hauptmann Goerske, noted on the teleprinter message: "to be processed". The process was not completed before the end of hostilities and he indicated "for the archives". No further evidence can be found that the process was completed. The Federal Ministry of Defence stated in a letter to the German Federal Archives from 1963 that they hold no record of the presentation. Major Walle was struck from a list, which very likely was created by the IIa (divisional adjutant for personnel matters of the officers) of OB Nordwest for nominated Knight's Crosses, indicating that the Knight's Cross may have been presented. A legitimate presentation is thus possible, but also not verifiable. According to the Association of Knight's Cross Recipients (AKCR) the award was presented in accordance with the Dönitz-decree. This is illegal according to the Deutsche Dienststelle (WASt) and lacks legal justification. The presentation date was assigned by Walther-Peer Fellgiebel.)	Heer	Major	Commander of Panzer-Jäger-Abteilung "Großdeutschland"	8 May 1945	—	—
[Prof. Dr.] Karl-Heinz Wallhäuser (Note: The brackets around the professor and doctor title [Prof. Dr.] denotes that the academic title was attained after the Knight's Cross of the Iron Cross was awarded.)	Luftwaffe	Oberleutnant of the Reserves	Leader of the 1./Fallschirm-Panzer-Jäger-Abteilung "Hermann Göring"	30 November 1944	—	—
Walther Wallowitz	Heer	Leutnant	Leader of the 5./Grenadier-Regiment 82	14 November 1943*	Killed in action 20 October 1943	—
Domenikus Walter	Luftwaffe	Oberfeldwebel	Pilot in the IV./Kampfgeschwader z.b.V. 1	24 December 1942 (Note: According to Scherzer on 23 December 1942.)	—	—
Gerhard Walter	Heer	Oberfeldwebel	Zugführer (platoon leader) in the 5.(MG)/Grenadier-Regiment 29 (motorized) (Note: According to Scherzer as Zugführer (platoon leader) in the 5./Grenadier-Regiment (motorized) 29.)	1 January 1944	—	—
Helmut Walter? (Note: Helmut Walter's nomination by the troop, most likely a teleprinter message, does not exist anymore. A Heerespersonalamt-Verleihungsvorschlag (HPA-VV—Army Staff Office Nomination Recommendation) was not created nor a file card. Major Joachim Domaschk listed him in the 1st section of the book "Verliehene Ritterkreuze" (Awarded Knight Crosses) with an entry number Nr. 5100. This number was assigned twice since the 2nd section of the book also begins with Nr. 5100. Why Major Domaschk entered him this way is unknown. The entry reveals that a nomination by the troop was received by the HPA on 9 May 1945, and further processed the same day (Scherzer assumes to General Ernst Maisel) and presented. The presentation had been communicated to the OB West. The file card in the German Archive was created in the 1960s by the Federal Ministry of Defence based on the entry in the book "Verliehene Ritterkreuze". The presentation was unlawful, first because it was made after 8 May 1945, secondly neither General Maisel nor Major Domaschk were authorized at this time.)	Heer	Hauptmann	Battalion leader in Feld-Unteroffizier-Schule Dahlhausen (2. Panzer-Division)	9 May 1945	—	—
Karl Walter	Heer	Oberstleutnant	Commander of Grenadier-Regiment 131	22 January 1943	—	—
Kurt Walter+	Heer	Major (Note: According to Scherzer as Hauptmann.)	Commander of the II./Infanterie-Regiment 32	25 September 1942	Awarded 345th Oak Leaves 5 December 1943	Black-and-white portrait of a man on the phone in semi profile wearing a military uniform with an Iron Cross displayed at his neck. He is holding a cigarette in his left hand.
Kurt Walter	Luftwaffe	Hauptmann	Gruppenkommandeur of the III./Sturzkampfgeschwader 3	26 March 1943* (Note: According to Scherzer on 18 May 1943.)	Killed in action 26 October 1942	—
Bernhard Walterbach	Heer	Unteroffizier	Zugführer (platoon leader) in the 2./Pionier-Bataillon 253	22 September 1943	—	—
Erich Walther+	Luftwaffe	Major	Commander of the I./Fallschirmjäger-Regiment 1	24 May 1940	Awarded 411th Oak Leaves 2 March 1944; 131st Swords 1 February 1945	—
Gerhard Walther	Luftwaffe	Hauptmann	Gruppenkommandeur of the II./Schlachtgeschwader 4	26 March 1944	—	—
Wilhelm Walther	Heer	Oberleutnant	Shock troops leader in the 4./Bau-Lehr-Bataillon z.b.V. 800 "Brandenburg" (Note: According to Scherzer as shock troops leader in the 4./Bau-Lehr-Bataillon z.b.V. 800.)	24 June 1940	—	—
Hans Walz	Heer	Oberleutnant	Chief of the 1./Panzer-Abteilung 103	14 April 1945	—	
Friedrich-Wilhelm Wandel	Heer	Hauptmann	Commander of the I./Grenadier-Regiment 347	27 October 1943*	Died of wounds 26 October 1943	—
Joachim Wandel	Luftwaffe	Hauptmann	Staffelkapitän of the 5./Jagdgeschwader 54	21 August 1942 (Note: According to Scherzer on 23 August 1942.)	—	—
Martin Wandel	Heer	Generalmajor	Commander of the 121. Infanterie-Division	23 November 1941	—	—
Martin Wandersleb	Heer	Hauptmann of the Reserves	Chief of the 10./Grenadier-Regiment 12	31 July 1943	—	—
Helmut Wandmaker	Heer	Major of the Reserves	Commander of the II./Panzergrenadier-Regiment 76	5 April 1945	—	—
Max Wandrey+	Heer	Oberleutnant of the Reserves	Chief of the 11./Jäger-Regiment 1 "Brandenburg"	9 January 1944	Awarded 787th Oak Leaves 16 March 1945	—
Friedrich-Wilhelm Wangerin	Luftwaffe	Hauptmann	Commander of the III./Fallschirmjäger-Regiment 16 -Ost- (Note: According to Scherzer as commander of the III./Fallschirmjäger-Regiment 16.)	24 October 1944	—	—
Günter Wanhöfer	Waffen-SS	SS-Hauptsturmführer (Note: According to Scherzer as SS-Hauptsturmführer of the Reserves and commander of SS-Pionier-Bataillon 54.)	Commander of SS-Pionier-Bataillon 54 "Nederland"	27 August 1944	—	—
Karl Wanka+	Heer	Oberleutnant of the Reserves	Leader of the I./Grenadier-Regiment 446	23 February 1944	Awarded 800th Oak Leaves 23 March 1945	—
Artur Wanke	Heer	Oberstleutnant	Commander of Grenadier-Regiment 680	25 October 1943	—	—
Erich Wapnitz	Heer	Unteroffizier	Group leader in the Stabskompanie (Radfahrzug)/Grenadier-Regiment 671 (Note: According to Scherzer as group leader in the Radfahrzug Stabskompanie/Grenadier-Regiment 671.)	17 March 1945	—	—
Fritz Warnecke	Heer	Major	Commander of the III./Grenadier-Regiment 517	22 January 1943	—	—
Karl Warnhoff	Heer	Major	Leader of Grenadier-Regiment 587	30 September 1943*	Killed in action 2 September 1943	—
Wolfgang Warnkross	Heer	Leutnant of the Reserves	Fähnrichsvater (ensign father/mentor) in Lehrkompanie of Grenadier-Feldausbildungs-Regiment 640 (Note: According to Scherzer as Fähnrichsvater (ensign father/mentor) in Lehrkompanie of Grenadier-(Feldausbildungs)-Regiment 640.)	12 August 1944	—	—
Hinrich Warrelmann+	Heer	Oberst	Commander of Grenadier-Regiment 502	16 April 1944	Awarded 555th Oak Leaves 19 August 1944	—
Wilhelm Warrelmann	Heer	Unteroffizier	Zugführer (platoon leader) in the 6./Grenadier-Regiment 328	15 March 1944*	Killed in action 13 February 1944 (Note: According to Scherzer killed in action on 12 March 1944.)	—
Horst Warschnauer+	Heer	Oberleutnant of the Reserves	Chief of the 2./Pionier-Bataillon "Großdeutschland" (motorized)	12 December 1942	Awarded 753rd Oak Leaves 24 February 1945	—
Guido von Wartenberg	Heer	Major	Leader of Panzergrenadier-Regiment 111	6 October 1943	—	—
Friedrich-Karl Warwel	Heer	Stabsfeldwebel	Zugführer (platoon leader) in the 14./Grenadier-Regiment 477	13 September 1943	—	—
Adolf Waßmann	Heer	Obergefreiter	Machine gunner in the 6./Grenadier-Regiment 255	16 March 1944	—	—
Ernst Wawrok	Heer	Oberfeldwebel	Zugführer (platoon leader) in the 13./Jäger-Regiment 28	9 February 1943	—	—
Alfons Weber	Heer	Hauptmann	Leader of the II./Gebirgsjäger-Regiment 91	9 June 1944	—	—
Alois Weber+	Heer	Major	Commander of the I./Infanterie-Regiment 19	26 November 1941	Awarded 579th Oak Leaves 10 September 1944	—
Alois Weber	Waffen-SS	SS-Hauptscharführer	Zugführer (platoon leader) in the 16.(Pi)/SS-Panzergrenadier-Regiment "Deutschland" (Note: According to Scherzer as Zugführer (platoon leader) in the 16./SS-Panzergrenadier-Regiment "Deutschland".)	30 July 1943	—	—
Benno Weber	Heer	Unteroffizier	Group leader in the 2./Grenadier-Regiment 467	23 December 1943	—	—
Franz Weber	Heer	Obergefreiter	In the 8./Jäger-Regiment 28	28 October 1944	—	—
Friedrich Weber	Heer	Oberstleutnant	Commander of Infanterie-Regiment 481	8 June 1940	—	—
Gerhard Weber	Heer	Oberst	Commander of Grenadier-Regiment 41 (motorized)	26 October 1943	—	—
Gottfried Weber+	Heer	Major	Commander of the I./Infanterie-Regiment 162	13 October 1941	Awarded 490th Oak Leaves 9 June 1944	—
Hans-Joachim Weber	Heer	Hauptmann (Note: According to Scherzer as Hauptmann of the Reserves.)	Commander of the III./Füsilier-Regiment 27	27 December 1944	—	—
[Dr.] Horst Weber (Note: The brackets around the doctor title [Dr.] denotes that the academic title was attained after the Knight's Cross of the Iron Cross was awarded.)	Kriegsmarine	Oberleutnant zur See of the Reserves (Note: According to Scherzer as Oberleutnant zur See and commander of Schnellboot S-55.)	Commander of Schnellboot S-55 in the 3. Schnellbootflottille	5 July 1943	—	—
Jakob Weber	Heer	Feldwebel	Demi Zugführer (platoon leader) in the 2./Panzer-Abteilung 21	16 August 1943	—	—
Karl-Heinz Weber+	Luftwaffe	Oberleutnant	Staffelführer of the 7./Jagdgeschwader 51 "Mölders"	12 November 1943	Awarded 529th Oak Leaves 20 July 1944	—
Otto Weber	Heer	Major of the Reserves	Commander of Grenadier-Regiment 933	31 October 1944*	Died of wounds 14 September 1944	—
Paul Weber	Heer	Leutnant of the Reserves	Leader of the 9./Grenadier-Regiment 508	25 July 1943	—	—
Paul-Friedel Weber	Heer	Oberleutnant	Chief of the 2./schwere Heeres-Flak-Abteilung 303 (Note: According to Scherzer as chief of the 2./Heeres-Flak-Artillerie-Abteilung 303.)	10 October 1942	—	—
Rudolf Weber	Heer	Feldwebel	Zugführer (platoon leader) in the 9./Panzer-Regiment 4	14 February 1945	—	—
Siegfried Weber	Heer	Oberleutnant	Leader of the III./Jäger-Regiment 49	30 October 1942	—	—
Walter Weber	Heer	Unteroffizier	Company troop leader in the 7./Infanterie-Regiment 211	13 October 1941	—	—
Wilhelm Weber	Waffen-SS	SS-Obersturmführer	Leader of the divisions combat school of the 33. (französisch) SS-Freiwilligen-Grenadier-Division "Charlemagne" (Note: According to Scherzer as leader of the divisions combat school/33. Waffen-Grenadier-Division der SS "Charlemagne" (französische Nr. 1).)	29 April 1945	—	—
Irnfried Freiherr von Wechmar	Heer	Oberstleutnant	Commander of Aufklärungs-Abteilung 3	13 April 1941	—	—
Willi Wechsung	Heer	Oberleutnant	Chief of the 1./Grenadier-Regiment 426	1 October 1943	—	—
Hans-Joachim Weck? (Note: No evidence of the award can be found in the German Federal Archives. Unlawful presentation of the Knight's Cross of the Iron Cross by the commanding general of the I. Fallschirmkorps, General der Fallschirmtruppe Richard Heidrich. Hans-Joachim Weck was a member of the Association of Knight's Cross Recipients.)	Luftwaffe	Leutnant	Leader of the 3./Fallschirmjäger-Regiment 4	30 April 1945	—	—
Franz Wecker? (Note: Franz Wecker's nomination by the troop was approved by all intermittent commanding officers and was received by the Heerespersonalamt (HPA—Army Staff Office) as a teleprinter message on 21 April 1945. It was not listed in the book "Verliehene Ritterkreuze" (Awarded Knight Crosses). It was left unfinished by the end of the war. There exists a file card for approved or unapproved nominations. According to the Association of Knight's Cross Recipients (AKCR) the award was presented in accordance with the Dönitz-decree. This is illegal according to the Deutsche Dienststelle (WASt) and lacks legal justification. The presentation date was assigned by Walther-Peer Fellgiebel.)	Heer	Oberstleutnant	Commander of Jäger-Regiment 734	9 May 1945	—	—
Ernst Weddig	Heer	Leutnant	Leader of the 4./Panzergrenadier-Regiment 101	20 April 1943*	Killed in action 8 March 1943	—
Busso von Wedel	Heer	Oberst	Commander of Grenadier-Regiment 89	18 May 1943	—	—
Hermann von Wedel	Heer	Oberst	Commander of Grenadier-Regiment 590	8 June 1943	—	—
Paul Wegener	Heer	Wachtmeister	Geschützführer (gun layer) in the 1./Sturmgeschütz-Abteilung 237	18 October 1943	—	—
Werner Wegener	Heer	Major of the Reserves	Commander of Pionier-Bataillon 3 (motorized)	24 December 1944	—	—
Wilhelm Wegener+	Heer	Oberst	Commander of Infanterie-Regiment 94	27 October 1941	Awarded 66th Oak Leaves 19 January 1942; 97th Swords 17 September 1944	—
Alois Weger	Heer	Oberleutnant of the Reserves	Chief of the 3./Panzergrenadier-Regiment 33	9 December 1944	—	—
Ferdinand Wegerer+	Heer	Unteroffizier	Zugführer (platoon leader) in the 1./Panzergrenadier-Regiment 10	8 October 1943	Awarded 483rd Oak Leaves 4 June 1944	—
Friedrich Weglehner	Heer	Major of the Reserves	Commander of the II./Grenadier-Regiment 390	12 August 1944	—	—
Wilhelm Wegner	Heer	Oberwachtmeister	Zugführer (platoon leader) in the 1./Sturmgeschütz-Abteilung "Großdeutschland"	13 June 1943	—	—
Anton Wehinger	Heer	Oberleutnant of the Reserves	Chief of the 1./Grenadier-Regiment 578	9 January 1945	—	—
Hermann Wehking	Heer	Oberwachtmeister	Vorgeschobener Beobachter (forward observer) in the 1./Artillerie-Regiment 146 (motorized)	15 January 1944	—	—
Lothar Wehlitz	Heer	Hauptmann of the Reserves	Chief of the 1./schwere Artillerie-Abteilung 845	6 February 1944	—	—
Alfred Wehmeyer	Luftwaffe	Oberleutnant	Staffelkapitän of the 7./Zerstörergeschwader 26 "Horst Wessel"	4 September 1942*	Killed in action 1 June 1942	
Gerhard Wehrmann	Heer	Hauptmann	Leader of Panzer-Grenadier-Feld-Ersatz-Bataillon 3 (Note: According to Scherzer as leader of Feld-Ersatz-Bataillon 3.)	3 November 1944	—	—
Ernst Weible	Luftwaffe	Oberfeldwebel	Pilot in the 3./Kampfgeschwader 54	6 April 1944*	Killed in action 25 March 1944	—
Maximilian Freiherr von und zu Weichs an der Glon+	Heer	General der Kavallerie	Commander-in-Chief of the 2. Armee	29 June 1940	Awarded 731st Oak Leaves 5 February 1945	A man wearing a military uniform and glasses with an Iron Cross displayed at the front of his uniform collar.
August Weichsel	Heer	Unteroffizier	Group leader in the 6./Grenadier-Regiment 948	30 April 1945	—	—
Ernst Weichsel	Heer	Major	Commander of the II./Panzergrenadier-Regiment 115	5 May 1945	—	—
Wilhelm Weidenbrück+	Heer	Oberleutnant	Chief of the 5./Panzer-Regiment 3	16 September 1942	Awarded 649th Oak Leaves 16 November 1944	—
Otto Weidhofer	Heer	Oberfeldwebel	Zugführer (platoon leader) in the 8./Grenadier-Regiment 162	15 May 1944	—	—
Otto Weidinger+	Waffen-SS	SS-Sturmbannführer	Commander of SS-Panzer-Aufklärungs-Abteilung 2 "Das Reich" (Note: According to Scherzer as commander of SS-Panzer-Aufklärungs-Abteilung 2.)	21 April 1944	Awarded 688th Oak Leaves 26 December 1944 (150th) Swords 6 May 1945? (Note: No evidence of the award can be found in the German Federal Archives. The award was unlawfully presented by SS-Oberstgruppenführer Sepp Dietrich. The date is taken from the announcement made by the 6. SS-Panzerarmee. The sequential number "150" was assigned by the Association of Knight's Cross Recipients (AKCR). Weidinger was member of the AKCR.)	A man wearing a military uniform, peaked cap and a neck order in the shape of a cross. His cap has an emblem in shape of a human skull and crossed bones.
Helmuth Weidling+	Heer	Generalmajor	Commander of the 86. Infanterie Division	15 January 1943	Awarded 408th Oak Leaves 22 February 1944; 115th Swords 28 November 1944	A man wearing a military uniform with an Iron Cross displayed at the front of his uniform collar.
Hermann Weigel	Heer	Major	Leader of Grenadier-Regiment 328	19 February 1945	—	—
Rudolf Weigel	Luftwaffe	Stabsfeldwebel	Pilot in the 7./Sturzkampfgeschwader 77	27 April 1942	—	—
Werner Weihrauch	Luftwaffe	Oberfeldwebel	Pilot in the 2./Sturzkampfgeschwader 77	19 February 1943	—	—
Hans Weik	Luftwaffe	Leutnant	Staffelführer of the 10./Jagdgeschwader 3 "Udet"	27 July 1944	—	—
[Dr.] August Weiler	Heer	Hauptmann	Battalion leader in Regiment "von Stössel" (Note: According to Scherzer as battalion leader in Regiment "von Stössel" (Alarm-Einheit (emergency unit) in the school VI for Fahnenjunker (cadets) of the infantry Metz)/Division-Nr. 462.)	16 November 1944	—	—
Bruno Weiler? (Note: Bruno Weiler's nomination by the troop was received by the Heerespersonalamt (HPA—Army Staff Office) on 28 April 1945. It was noted in the book "Verliehene Ritterkreuze" (Awarded Knight Crosses) with an entry number Nr. 5141. Major Joachim Domaschk approved on 30 April 1945. There is no file card nor further evidence regarding its presentation can be found. According to the Association of Knight's Cross Recipients (AKCR) the award was presented in accordance with the Dönitz-decree. This is illegal according to the Deutsche Dienststelle (WASt) and lacks legal justification. The presentation date was assigned by Walther-Peer Fellgiebel.)	Heer	Oberst	Commander of Ski-Jäger-Regiment 1	9 May 1945	—	—
Kilian Weimer+	Heer	Hauptmann	Commander of the I./Infanterie-Regiment 109	31 August 1941	Awarded 478th Oak Leaves 14 May 1944	—
Otto Weimer	Heer	Leutnant of the Reserves	Leader of the 2./Grenadier-Regiment 957	24 December 1944	—	—
Georg Weinbuch	Heer	Oberwachtmeister	Zugführer (platoon leader) in the 6./schweres Artillerie-Regiment 46 (Note: According to Scherzer in the 6./schweres Artillerie-Regiment 46.)	28 July 1942*	Died of wounds 24 May 1942	—
Johannes Weineck	Luftwaffe	Oberleutnant	Observer in the 5.(F)/Aufklärungs-Gruppe 122 (Note: According to Scherzer as observer in the Aufklärungsstaffel 5.(F)/122.)	29 February 1944	—	—
Rudolf Weinelt	Heer	Leutnant of the Reserves	Leader of the 2./Panzer-Pionier-Bataillon 19	12 November 1943	—	—
Friedrich-August Weinknecht	Heer	Generalmajor	Commander of the 79. Infanterie-Division	15 July 1944	—	—
Werner Weinlig? (Note: There is no reference of the Knight's Cross awarded to Werner Weidlig in the German Federal Archives. His personal file contains a letter from 1955 by the Deutsche Dienststelle (WASt), indicating that no proof of the award exists. The date was assigned by the Association of Knight's Cross Recipients (AKCR).)	Kriegsmarine	Kapitänleutnant	Commander of Torpedoboot T-23	10 May 1945	—	—
Fritz Weinreich	Heer	Unteroffizier	Zugführer (platoon leader) in the 4./Reiter-Regiment 41	17 March 1945*	Killed in action 1 February 1945	—
Helmut Weinreich	Luftwaffe	Oberleutnant	Staffelkapitän in the III./Kampfgeschwader 30	21 January 1943 (Note: According to Scherzer on 22 January 1943.)	—	—
Gustav Weippert	Luftwaffe	Oberfeldwebel	Pilot and observer in the 2.(H)/Aufklärungs-Gruppe 4 (Note: According to Scherzer as pilot and observer in the 2./Nahaufklärungsgruppe 4.)	30 September 1944	—	—
Hubert Weise	Luftwaffe	General der Flakartillerie	Commanding general of the I. Flak-Korps	24 June 1940	—	
Karl Weisenberger	Heer	Generalleutnant	Commander of the 71. Infanterie-Division	29 June 1940	—	
Hermann Weiser	Waffen-SS	SS-Obersturmführer of the Reserves	Leader of the 2.(Aufklärungs-Abteilung)/"Leibstandarte SS Adolf Hitler" (Note: According to Scherzer as leader of the 2./SS-Aufklärungs-Abteilung "Leibstandarte SS Adolf Hitler".)	28 March 1943	—	—
Hans-Georg Weisleder	Heer	Hauptmann of the Reserves	Commander of the III./Grenadier-Regiment 453	21 September 1944	—	—
Ernst Weismann	Luftwaffe	Leutnant	Pilot in the 12./Jagdgeschwader 51 "Mölders"	21 August 1942	—	—
Adolf Weiß	Luftwaffe	Oberfeldwebel	Pilot in the 4./Sturzkampfgeschwader 77	29 February 1944	—	—
Christian Weiß	Heer	Hauptmann	Commander of the II./Infanterie-Regiment 26	10 April 1942	—	—
Ernst Weiß	Heer	Oberst	Commander of Grenadier-Regiment 572	24 June 1944	—	—
Franz Weiß	Heer	Major of the Reserves	Commander of the III./Panzer-Regiment 2	11 March 1945	—	—
Friedrich Weiß	Luftwaffe	Unteroffizier	Geschützführer (gun layer) in the 1./Flak-Regiment 36 (motorized) (Note: According to Scherzer as Geschützführer (gun layer) in the 1./Flak-Regiment 36.)	21 December 1942	—	—
Georg Weiß	Heer	Unteroffizier	Group leader in the 6./Grenadier-Regiment 521	12 November 1943	—	—
Hans Weiss	Waffen-SS	SS-Hauptsturmführer	Commander of SS-Panzer-Aufklärungs-Abteilung 2 "Das Reich" (Note: According to Scherzer as commander of SS-Panzer-Aufklärungs-Abteilung 2.)	6 April 1943	—	A smiling man wearing a military uniform, peaked cap with skull emblem and neck order in the shape of a cross.
Herbert Weiß	Heer	Hauptmann of the Reserves	Commander of the II./Grenadier-Regiment 418	7 January 1943	—	—
Josef Weiß	Heer	Obergefreiter	Company troop messenger in the 1./Grenadier-Regiment 24 (Note: According to Scherzer as messenger in the 1./Grenadier-Regiment 24.)	23 March 1945*	Died of wounds 13 March 1945	—
Otto Weiß+	Luftwaffe	Hauptmann	Gruppenkommandeur of the II.(S)/Lehrgeschwader 2	18 May 1940	Awarded 52nd Oak Leaves 31 December 1941	The head and shoulders of a young man, shown from the front. He wears a military uniform, with an Iron Cross displayed at the front of his white shirt collar. His facial expression is a determined and a grim smile; his eyes are looking to the left of the camera.
Paul Weiß	Heer	Obergefreiter	Group leader of the 6./Grenadier-Regiment 481	16 September 1943	—	—
Richard Weiß	Heer	Major of the Reserves	Commander of Panzer-Abteilung 8	30 April 1945	—	—
Robert Weiß+	Luftwaffe	Oberleutnant	Staffelkapitän of the 3./Jagdgeschwader 54 (Note: According to Scherzer as Staffelkapitän in the IV./Jagdgeschwader 54.)	26 March 1944	Awarded 782nd Oak Leaves 12 March 1945	
Walter Weiß+	Heer	Generalmajor	Commander of the 26. Infanterie-Division	12 September 1941	Awarded 646th Oak Leaves 5 November 1944	A man wearing a military uniform with an Iron Cross displayed at the front of his uniform collar.
Wilhelm Weißberg	Luftwaffe	Hauptmann	Commander of the I./Flak-Regiment 25 (motorized) (Note: According to Scherzer as commander of the I./Flak-Regiment 25.)	24 October 1944	—	—
Bruno Weisse	Heer	Hauptmann of the Reserves	Leader of the II./Grenadier-Regiment 430	28 October 1944	—	—
[Dr.] Horst Weissenberg	Heer	Major (Note: According to Scherzer as Major of the Reserves and commander of the I./Grenadier-Regiment 1.)	Commander of Grenadier-Regiment 1	23 March 1945	—	—
Theodor Weissenberger+	Luftwaffe	Leutnant	Pilot in the 6./Jagdgeschwader 5	13 November 1942	Awarded 266th Oak Leaves 2 August 1943	Black-and-white portrait of a man wearing a peaked cap and military flight suit with an Iron Cross displayed at his neck.
Erich Weißflog	Luftwaffe	Oberleutnant	Information officer and wireless operator of Nachtjagdgeschwader 1 (Note: According to Scherzer as information officer in the Stab/Nachtjagdgeschwader 1.)	24 June 1944	—	—
Hans-Joachim Weißflog	Heer	Leutnant	Leader of the 2./Panzer-Regiment 16	5 March 1945	—	—
[Prof. Dr.] Eginhard Weißmann	Luftwaffe	Leutnant	Pilot in the 1./Schlachtgeschwader 2 "Immelmann"	5 September 1944	—	—
Ludwig Weißmüller	Heer	Hauptmann	Commander of the II./Grenadier-Regiment 462	11 October 1943*	Killed in action 18 August 1943	—
Josef Weiter	Heer	Feldwebel	Zugführer (platoon leader) in the 1./Grenadier-Regiment 697	24 June 1944	—	—
Adolf Weitkunat+	Heer	Rittmeister of the Reserves	Chief of Aufklärungs-Schwadron 206	4 November 1941	Awarded 346th Oak Leaves 5 December 1943	—
Paul Weitkus	Luftwaffe	Oberstleutnant	Geschwaderkommodore of Kampfgeschwader 53 "Legion Condor"	18 September 1941	—	—
Adalbert Weitzel	Heer	Oberstleutnant	Commander of Panzergrenadier-Regiment 6	23 August 1944*	Killed in action 17 August 1944	—
Martin Wekenmann	Heer	Oberleutnant of the Reserves	Leader of the I./Panzergrenadier-Regiment 35	5 February 1945	—	—
Heinrich Welken	Luftwaffe	Oberleutnant	Chief of the 2./Flak-Regiment 231 (motorized)	5 September 1944	—	—
Franz Weller+	Heer	Major	Leader of Infanterie-Regiment 54	4 September 1941	Awarded 626th Oak Leaves 23 October 1944	—
Ernst Wellmann+	Heer	Oberstleutnant	Commander of the I./Panzergrenadier-Regiment 3	2 September 1942	Awarded 342nd Oak Leaves 30 November 1943	—
Willi Welsch	Heer	Hauptmann	Chief of the 2./Schützen-Regiment 110	29 September 1941	—	A man wearing a military uniform and neck order in the shape of a cross.
Heinrich Welskop	Luftwaffe	Oberfeldwebel	Zugführer (platoon leader) in the 11./Fallschirmjäger-Regiment 3	21 August 1941	—	—
Kurt Welter+	Luftwaffe	Leutnant	Pilot in the 2./Nachtjagdgeschwader 11 (Note: According to Scherzer as pilot in the 10./Jagdgeschwader 300.)	18 October 1944	Awarded 769th Oak Leaves 11 March 1945	—
Franz-Josef Welzel	Heer	Major	Commander of the I./Infanterie-Regiment 461	19 July 1940	—	—
Karl-Heinrich Welzel	Luftwaffe	Feldwebel	Pilot in the 7./Schlachtgeschwader 10	5 September 1944	—	—
Walther Wenck	Heer	Oberst im Generalstab (in the General Staff)	German chief of the general staff in the 3. Rumänische Armee (Note: According to Scherzer as chief of the general staff of the Armeegruppe Hollidt.)	28 October 1942	—	A man wearing a military uniform and neck order in the shape of a cross.
Gerhard Wendenburg	Heer	Major	Commander of Panzer-Abteilung 67	15 August 1940	—	—
Heinrich Wendland	Heer	Oberleutnant of the Reserves	Chief of the 5./Panzergrenadier-Regiment 304	20 July 1944*	Killed in action 18 June 1944	—
Siegfried Wendlandt	Heer	Hauptmann of the Reserves	Commander of the I./Grenadier-Regiment 320	16 January 1945	—	—
Helmut Wendorff	Waffen-SS	SS-Untersturmführer	Zugführer (platoon leader) in the 13.(schwere)/SS-Panzer-Regiment 1 "Leibstandarte SS Adolf Hitler" (Note: According to Scherzer as Zugführer (platoon leader) in the 13.(schwere)/SS-Panzer-Regiment 1.)	12 February 1944	—	—
Gustáv Wendrinský	Waffen-SS	SS-Oberscharführer	Zugführer (platoon leader) in the 1./SS-Panzer-Jäger-Abteilung 8 "Florian Geyer" (Note: According to Scherzer as Zugführer (platoon leader) in the 1./SS-Panzer-Jäger-Abteilung 8.)	27 January 1945	—	—
Karl Wendt	Heer	Oberfeldwebel	Zugführer (platoon leader) in the 2./Grenadier-Regiment 412	21 September 1944*	Killed in action 17 September 1944	—
Manfred Wendt	Heer	Hauptmann	Tasked with the leadership of the I./Panzergrenadier-Regiment 66 (Note: According to Scherzer as leader of the I./Panzergrenadier-Regiment 66.)	9 July 1944	—	—
Rudi Wendt	Luftwaffe	Oberfeldwebel	Pilot in the Stab/Schlachtgeschwader 2 "Immelmann"	17 April 1945	—	—
Wilhelm Wendt	Heer	Hauptfeldwebel	Kompaniefeldwebel (company sergeant) in the 5./Panzer-Regiment 5	30 June 1941	—	—
Wolf Wendt	Heer	Hauptmann	Adjutant in Grenadier-Regiment 88	12 August 1944	—	—
Leopold Wenger	Luftwaffe	Oberleutnant	Staffelkapitän of the 4./Schlachtgeschwader 10 (Note: According to Scherzer as pilot in the 4./Schlachtgeschwader 10.)	14 January 1945	—	A man wearing a military uniform and neck order in the shape of a cross.
Maximilian Wengler+	Heer	Oberstleutnant of the Reserves	Commander of Infanterie-Regiment 366	6 October 1942	Awarded 404th Oak Leaves 22 February 1944; 123rd Swords 21 January 1945	A man wearing a military uniform, peaked cap and neck order in the shape of a cross.
Karl Weniger	Kriegsmarine	Kapitän zur See	Leader of the 2. Sicherungs-Division	15 November 1941*	Killed in action 1 October 1941	—
Josef Wenigmann	Luftwaffe	Oberfeldwebel	Pilot in the 3./Sturzkampfgeschwader 3	5 July 1941	—	—
Klaus Wenke	Kriegsmarine	Oberleutnant zur See of the Reserves	Commander of U-Jäger UJ-208	5 November 1944	—	—
Matthias Wensauer	Heer	Major (Note: According to Scherzer as Major of the Reserves and combat commander of Oppeln.)	Leader of Grenadier-Regiment 442	30 April 1945	—	—
Fritz Wentzell	Heer	Generalmajor	Chief of the general staff of the 10. Armee	23 October 1944	—	—
Alfred Wenz	Heer	Oberleutnant (Note: According to Scherzer as Oberleutnant of the Reserves.)	Chief of the 7./Grenadier-Regiment 435	21 September 1944*	Died of wounds 19 September 1944	—
Bernhard Wenzel	Heer	Oberleutnant	Chief of the 12./Panzer-Regiment 24	12 August 1944	—	—
Georg Wenzelburger	Heer	Hauptmann	Leader of the II./Grenadier-Regiment 1098	26 December 1944	—	—
Richard von Werder	Heer	Oberstleutnant	Commander of the II./Infanterie-Regiment 102	4 September 1940	—	—
Dr. chem. Peter Werfft	Luftwaffe	Hauptmann (Note: According to Scherzer as Oberleutnant of the Reserves)	Gruppenkommandeur of the III./Jagdgeschwader 27	28 January 1945	—	—
Wilhelm Werlin	Luftwaffe	Hauptmann	Staffelkapitän in the I./Kampfgeschwader 27 "Boelcke"	30 December 1942	—	—
Rudolf Wermter	Heer	Hauptmann	Leader of the I./Grenadier-Regiment 415	13 December 1942	—	—
Ernst Werner	Heer	Hauptmann	Leader of the III./Infanterie-Regiment 516	10 September 1942	—	—
Ernst-August Werner	Heer	Hauptmann of the Reserves	Commander of the II./Grenadier-Regiment 980	19 August 1944	—	—
Gerhard Werner+	Heer	Oberleutnant	Chief of the 5./Jagd-Kommando 8	23 February 1942	Awarded 793rd Oak Leaves 23 March 1945	—
Heinz Werner	Heer	Major	Commander of the I./Artillerie-Regiment 240	6 March 1944* (Note: According to Scherzer on 7 March 1944.)	Killed in action 26 January 1944	—
Heinz Werner+	Waffen-SS	SS-Hauptsturmführer	Leader of the III.(gepanzert)/SS-Panzergrenadier-Regiment 4 "Der Führer" (Note: According to Scherzer as leader of the III./SS-Panzergrenadier-Regiment 4 "Der Führer".)	23 August 1944	Awarded (864th) Oak Leaves 6 May 1945 (Note: No evidence of the award can be found in the German Federal Archives. The award was unlawfully presented by SS-Oberstgruppenführer Sepp Dietrich. The date is taken from the announcement made by the 6. SS-Panzerarmee. The sequential number "864" was assigned by the Association of Knight's Cross Recipients (AKCR). Werner was a member of the AKCR.)	—
Otto Werner	Heer	Oberfeldwebel	Zugführer (platoon leader) in the 3./schwere Panzer-Jäger-Abteilung 666 (Note: According to Scherzer as Zugführer (platoon leader) in the 3./schwere Heeres-Panzer-Jäger-Abteilung 666.)	22 January 1944*	Killed in action 18 December 1943	—
Paul-Hermann Werner	Heer	Oberst	Commander of Panzer-Regiment 31	3 June 1940	—	—
Walter Werner	Luftwaffe	Feldwebel	Group leader in the 1./Fallschirm-Pionier-Bataillon 1	9 June 1944	—	—
Heinz Wernicke	Luftwaffe	Leutnant	Pilot in the 1./Jagdgeschwader 54 (Note: According to Scherzer as pilot in the II./Jagdgeschwader 54.)	30 September 1944	—	—
Emil Wernig	Heer	Feldwebel	Zugführer (platoon leader) in the 4./Grenadier-Regiment 105	25 June 1943	—	—
Ulrich Wernitz	Luftwaffe	Feldwebel	Pilot in the 4./Jagdgeschwader 54 (Note: According to Scherzer as pilot in the I./Jagdgeschwader 54.)	29 October 1944	—	—
Franz Baron von Werra	Luftwaffe	Oberleutnant	Adjutant of the II./Jagdgeschwader 3	14 December 1940	—	
Hellmuth Werther (Note: According to Scherzer name is spelled Helmuth Werther who received the Knight's Cross of the Iron Cross as group leader of the Minenschiffe (minelayers) in the 21. UJ-Flottille.)	Kriegsmarine	Oberleutnant zur See of the Reserves	Commander and group leader in the Küstenschutz-Flottille "Attika"	8 November 1944	—	—
Thilo Freiherr von Werthern	Heer	Oberleutnant	Chief of the 3./Schützen-Regiment 394	8 September 1941	—	—
Thilo Freiherr und Herr von Werthern-Beichlingen	Heer	Oberleutnant	Chief of the 1./Panzer-Regiment 27	18 November 1941	—	—
Willy Wesche+	Heer	Major	Commander of Grenadier-Regiment 430 (Note: According to Scherzer as leader of Grenadier-Regiment 430.)	9 April 1943	Awarded 541st Oak Leaves 6 August 1944	—
Rudolf Wessel	Heer	Unteroffizier	Group leader in the 1./Grenadier-Regiment 1076	26 December 1944	—	—
Walter Wessel+	Heer	Oberst	Commander of Infanterie-Regiment 15 (motorized)	15 August 1940	Awarded 76th Oak Leaves 17 February 1942	—
Johann-Friedrich Wessels	Kriegsmarine	Kapitänleutnant (Ing.)	Chief engineer on U-198	9 March 1944	—	—
Otto Weßling+	Luftwaffe	Oberfeldwebel	Pilot in the 9./Jagdgeschwader 3 "Udet" (Note: According to Scherzer on 4 September 1942 as pilot in the 1./Jagdgeschwader 3 "Udet".)	3 September 1942	Awarded 530th Oak Leaves 20 July 1944	—
Günter Westberg	Heer	Leutnant (Note: According to Scherzer as Leutnant of the Reserves.)	Leader of the 1./Aufklärungs-Abteilung 8	31 January 1945*	Killed in action 16 December 1944	—
Walter Westenberger	Heer	Hauptmann	Commander of the I./Grenadier-Regiment 255	12 November 1943	—	—
Wilhelm Westermann	Heer	Leutnant	Leader of the 1./Kradschützen-Bataillon 25	15 September 1941	—	—
Heinrich Westhofen	Heer	Oberleutnant	Chief of the 3./Schützen-Regiment 73	1 March 1942	—	—
Franz Westhoven	Heer	Generalleutnant	Commander of the 3. Panzer-Division	25 October 1943	—	—
Siegfried Westphal	Heer	Oberst im Generalstab (in the General Staff)	Ia (operations officer) in the Deutsch-Italienische Panzerarmee (Note: According to Scherzer as chief of staff of the Deutsch-Italienische Panzerarmee.)	29 November 1942	—	
Otto Westphalen	Kriegsmarine	Oberleutnant zur See	Commander of U-968	23 March 1945	—	—
Heinrich Wetjen	Heer	Hauptmann of the Reserves	Commander of the I./Jäger-Regiment 49	28 March 1945	—	—
Alfred Wettengel	Heer	Oberleutnant of the Reserves	Chief of the Stabsbatterie of the I./Artillerie-Regiment 60	21 September 1944	—	—
Karl Wettengel	Heer	Hauptmann of the Reserves	Adjutant in Grenadier-Regiment 559	24 January 1944	—	—
Friedrich Wetzel	Heer	Unteroffizier	Group leader in the 7./Grenadier-Regiment 438	19 August 1944	—	—
Wilhelm Wetzel	Heer	General der Infanterie	Commanding general of the V. Armeekorps	7 August 1942	—	—
Kurt Wevelsiep (Note: According to Scherzer name is spelled Kurt Wewelsiep who received the Knight's Cross of the Iron Cross as chief of the 2./Heeres-PionierBataillon 327.)	Heer	Oberleutnant of the Reserves	Chief of the 2./Pionier-Bataillon 327	30 September 1944	—	—
Walther Wever	Luftwaffe	Leutnant	Pilot in the 3./Jagdgeschwader 51 "Mölders"	28 January 1945	—	—
Erich Weyel	Heer	Oberleutnant	Leader of the 14.(Panzerjäger)/Infanterie-Regiment 506 (Note: According to Scherzer as leader of the 14./Infanterie-Regiment 506.)	20 December 1941	—	—
Kurt Weyher	Kriegsmarine	Fregattenkapitän	Commander of auxiliary cruiser Orion (HSK-1)	21 August 1941	—	—
Martin Weymann	Heer	Oberstleutnant	Commander of Panzergrenadier-Regiment 3	10 February 1945	—	—
Ernst von Weyrauch	Luftwaffe	Hauptmann	Staffelkapitän of the 2.(H)/Aufklärungs-Gruppe 14 (Note: According to Scherzer as Staffelkapitän of the Aufklärungsstaffel 2.(H)/14.)	31 December 1943	—	—
Helmut Weyrauch	Heer	Leutnant (Note: According to Scherzer as Leutnant of the Reserves and leader of the 4./Grenadier-Regiment 81.)	Leader of the 4.(MG)/Grenadier-Regiment 81	7 December 1943	—	—
Willy Wichert	Heer	Hauptmann of the Reserves	Chief of the 3./Divisions-Füsilier-Bataillon 291	6 November 1943	—	—
Helmut Wick+	Luftwaffe	Oberleutnant	Staffelkapitän of the 3./Jagdgeschwader 2 "Richthofen"	27 August 1940	Awarded 4th Oak Leaves 6 October 1940 (Note: According to Scherzer on 25 October 1940.)	The head and shoulders of a young man. He wears a military uniform, an Iron Cross displayed at the front of his shirt collar and breast pocket.
Wolfhart Wicke	Heer	Oberleutnant of the Reserves (Note: According to Scherzer as Oberleutnant.)	Chief of the 5./Gebirgsjäger-Regiment 144	8 February 1943	—	—
Thomas-Emil von Wickede	Heer	Oberstleutnant	Commander of Infanterie-Regiment 4	15 August 1940	—	—
Paul Wickel	Heer	Hauptmann of the Reserves	Leader of the I./Grenadier-Regiment 57	4 June 1944	—	—
Theo Wickmann	Heer	Hauptmann	Leader of Grenadier-Regiment 248	23 March 1945	—	—
Erwin Widmayer	Heer	Feldwebel	Zugführer (platoon leader) in the 11./Grenadier-Regiment 358	12 August 1944	—	—
Karl-Heinz Wiebe	Kriegsmarine	Kapitänleutnant (Ing.)	Chief engineer on U-178	22 May 1944	—	—
Franz-Josef Wiechec	Heer	Major	Leader of Fähnrichs-Regiment 3 (Division "Märkisch Friedland") (Note: According to Scherzer as leader of Fähnrichs-Regiment 3.)	5 April 1945	—	—
Josef Wiechoczek	Heer	Leutnant of the Reserves	Leader of the 5./Jäger-Regiment 28	9 December 1944	—	—
Friedrich-Wilhelm Wiede	Heer	Hauptmann of the Reserves	Chief of the 9./Artillerie-Regiment 238	7 February 1944	—	—
Wolfgang Wiedemann	Heer	Hauptmann	Commander of Panzer-Aufklärungs-Abteilung 125	10 September 1943*	Killed in action 6 September 1943	—
Karl Wiegand	Luftwaffe	Oberleutnant	Chief of the 2./Flak-Regiment 18 (motorized) (Note: According to Scherzer as chief of the 2./Flak-Regiment 18.)	9 May 1942	—	
Kurt Wiegand	Heer	Obergefreiter	Richtschütze (gunner) in the Panzer-Jäger-Abteilung 32 (Note: According to Scherzer as Richtschütze (gunner) in the 1./Panzer-Jäger-Abteilung 32.)	5 January 1944	—	—
Friedrich Wieland	Heer	Rittmeister of the Reserves	Commander of Aufklärungs-Abteilung 94	16 October 1944	—	—
Willy Wieland	Heer	Unteroffizier	Zugführer (platoon leader) in the 11./Panzergrenadier-Regiment 35	25 January 1945	—	—
Hans Wienke	Heer	Hauptmann of the Reserves	Commander of the I./Grenadier-Regiment 196	13 October 1943*	Killed in action 13 August 1943	—
Walter Wienke	Heer	Hauptmann	Leader of the II./Infanterie-Regiment 426	20 August 1942	—	—
Arno Wienrich	Heer	Stabsgefreiter	Vorgeschobener Beobachter (forward observer) and radio operator in the 2./Artillerie-Regiment 11	5 May 1945 (Note: According to Scherzer on 6 May 1945.)	—	—
Helmuth Wierschin	Heer	Stabsfeldwebel	Zugführer (platoon leader) in the 2./Panzer-Regiment 18	12 January 1942	—	—
Erich Wiese	Luftwaffe	Hauptmann	Observer in the 1.(F)/Nacht-Aufklärungs-Staffel (Note: According to Scherzer as observer in the Aufklärungsstaffel 1.(F)/Nacht.)	26 March 1944*	Killed on active duty 31 December 1943	—
Friedrich Wiese+	Heer	Oberst	Commander of Infanterie-Regiment 39	14 February 1942	Awarded 372nd Oak Leaves 24 January 1944	—
Heinrich Wiese	Heer	Hauptmann	Commander of the III./Grenadier-Regiment 361 (motorized)	4 October 1944	—	—
Hubert Wiese	Heer	Oberst	Commander of Grenadier-Regiment 552	5 May 1945	—	—
Johannes Wiese+	Luftwaffe	Hauptmann	Staffelkapitän of the 2./Jagdgeschwader 52	5 January 1943	Awarded 418th Oak Leaves 2 March 1944	—
Helmut Wieselhuber	Heer	Leutnant	Zugführer (platoon leader) in the I./schweres Werfer-Regiment 1 (Note: According to Scherzer in the I./schweres Werfer-Regiment (motorized) 1.)	14 May 1944	—	—
Emil Wiesemann	Waffen-SS	SS-Hauptsturmführer of the Reserves	Chief of the 2./SS-Sturmgeschütz-Abteilung 1 "Leibstandarte SS Adolf Hitler" (Note: According to Scherzer as chief of the 2./SS-Sturmgeschütz-Abteilung 1.)	20 December 1943*	Killed in action 14 November 1943	—
Otto Wiesemann	Heer	Feldwebel	Zugführer (platoon leader) in the 1./Panzer-Regiment 1	11 December 1944	—	—
Hugo Wiesmann	Heer	Unteroffizier	Richtschütze (gunner) in the 1./Panzer-Regiment 11	21 September 1944	—	—
Herbert Wiesner	Heer	Oberleutnant	Leader of the 3./Heeres-Pionier-Bataillon 42	21 September 1944	—	—
Willi Wiesner	Heer	Major	Commander of the I./Artillerie-Regiment 257	29 September 1941	—	—
Xaver Wiest	Heer	Oberjäger	Group leader in the 3./Skijäger-Regiment 1	26 November 1944	—	—
Gustav Anton von Wietersheim	Heer	General der Infanterie	Commanding general of the XIV. Armeekorps (Note: According to Scherzer as commanding general of the XIV. Armeekorps (mototized).)	20 April 1941	—	—
Walter von Wietersheim	Heer	Hauptmann	Commander of the II./Panzer-Regiment "Großdeutschland"	15 May 1944	—	—
Wend von Wietersheim+	Heer	Oberstleutnant	Commander of Schützen-Regiment 113	10 February 1942	Awarded 176th Oak Leaves 12 January 1943; 58th Swords 26 March 1944	Black-and-white portrait of a man in semi profile wearing a military uniform with an Iron Cross displayed at his neck.
Franz Wieting	Luftwaffe	Oberleutnant	Staffelkapitän of the 6./Kampfgeschwader 30	14 June 1940 (Note: According to Scherzer on 19 June 1940.)	—	—
Mauritz von Wiktorin	Heer	Generalleutnant	Commander of the 20. Infanterie-Division (motorized)	15 August 1940	—	—
Karl-Heinz Wilborn (Note: According to Scherzer name is Manfred Wilborn who received the Knight's Cross of the Iron Cross on 5 May 1945 as Unteroffizier.)	Heer	Unteroffizier of the Reserves	Group leader in the 9./Panzergrenadier-Regiment 25	6 May 1945	—	—
Dr. med. Horst Wilcke	Heer	Oberarzt of the Reserves (rank equivalent to Oberleutnant)	Troop doctor in the III./Infanterie-Regiment 120 (motorized) (Note: According to Scherzer as battalion doctor of the III./Infanterie-Regiment 120 (motorized).)	25 July 1942	—	—
Wolf-Dietrich Wilcke+	Luftwaffe	Hauptmann	Gruppenkommandeur of the III./Jagdgeschwader 53	6 August 1941	Awarded 122nd Oak Leaves 9 September 1942; 23rd Swords 23 December 1942	
Philipp Wild	Waffen-SS	SS-Oberscharführer	Panzer commander in the 1./SS-Panzer-Abteilung 11	21 March 1944	—	—
Heinz Wilde	Heer	Stabsintendant (rank equivalent to Hauptmann) (Note: According to Scherzer as Stabsintendant of the Reserves.)	Divisionsintendant (IV a—replenishment staff officer) in the 353. Infanterie-Division and leader of a Kampfgruppe	21 September 1944	—	—
Dr. jur. Hermann-Eberhard Wildermuth	Heer	Major of the Reserves	Commander of the II./Infanterie-Regiment 272	15 August 1940	—	
Anton Wildner	Heer	Obergefreiter	Group leader in the 1./Regiments-Gruppe 482	10 September 1944	—	—
Waldemar Wildschütz	Heer	Hauptmann	Leader of the I./Infanterie-Regiment 419	2 October 1942	—	—
Günther Wilfling	Heer	Leutnant of the Reserves	Leader of the 11./Grenadier-Regiment 501	5 May 1943	—	—
Hans-Joachim Wilhelm	Luftwaffe	Oberleutnant	Pilot in the 9./Kampfgeschwader 1 "Hindenburg"	29 October 1944	—	—
Karl-Heinz Wilhelm	Heer	Oberleutnant of the Reserves	Chief of the 3./Grenadier-Regiment 46	31 March 1943	—	—
Paul Wilhelm? (Note: No evidence of the award can be found in the German Federal Archives. According to Walther-Peer Fellgiebel the presentation was made by Feldmarschall Ferdinand Schörner in accordance with the enabling act of 3 May 1945. The Order Commission of the Association of Knight's Cross Recipients (AKCR) processed this case in 1973 and decided: "yes". What evidence was analyzed and processed is unknown to Scherzer. Scherzer was denied access to files, which could help clarify the case, of the AKCR on the grounds of the Bundesarchivgesetz (German Archive Law). Paul Wilhelm was a member of AKCR.)	Heer	Hauptfeldwebel	Leader of Alarmkompanie (alarm company) in Marsch-Bataillon 469	5 May 1945	—	—
Giselher Wilke	Heer	Leutnant of the Reserves	Zugführer (platoon leader) in the 1.(Jagdpanzer)/Panzer-Jäger-Abteilung 19 (Note: According to Scherzer as Zugführer (platoon leader) in the 1./Panzer-Jäger-Abteilung 19.)	14 April 1945	—	—
Gustav Wilke	Luftwaffe	Oberstleutnant	Gruppenkommandeur of Kampfgruppe z.b.V. 11	24 May 1940 (Note: According to Scherzer on 29 May 1940.)	—	—
Heinrich Wilke	Luftwaffe	Feldwebel	Radio/wireless operator in the II./Nachtjagdgeschwader 100 (Note: According to Scherzer as radio/wireless operator in the III./Nachtjagdgeschwader 5 on 25 November 1944.)	6 December 1944	—	—
[Dr.] Karl-Heinz Wilke	Luftwaffe	Leutnant	Pilot and observer in the 2.(H)/Aufklärungs-Gruppe 4 (Note: According to Scherzer as pilot and observer in the 2./Nahaufklärungsgruppe 4.)	25 November 1944	—	—
Fritz Will	Luftwaffe	Feldwebel	Pilot in the 6./Kampfgeschwader 53 "Legion Condor"	22 May 1943	—	—
Karl Willig+	Heer	Hauptmann	Leader of the II./Infanterie-Regiment 120 (motorized)	25 July 1942	Awarded 179th Oak Leaves 18 January 1943	—
Gerhard Willing	Heer	Major	Commander of the III./Panzer-Regiment 33	7 March 1943	—	—
Karl Willius	Luftwaffe	Leutnant	Staffelführer of the 2./Jagdgeschwader 26 "Schlageter"	9 June 1944*	Killed in action 8 April 1944	—
Kurt Willms	Heer	Leutnant	Zugführer (platoon leader) in the 1./Pionier-Bataillon 36	23 February 1944	—	—
Alfred Wimmer	Heer	Oberleutnant	Leader of the III./Grenadier-Regiment "Oberrhein" (Note: According to Scherzer as leader of the III./Grenadier-Regiment 3 "Oberrhein" (553. Volksgrenadier-Division).)	16 January 1945*	Killed in action 9 January 1944	—
Friedrich Wimmer	Heer	Oberfeldwebel	Zugführer (platoon leader) in the 8./Grenadier-Regiment 412	30 September 1944	—	—
Johann Wimmer	Luftwaffe	Hauptmann	Commander of the I./Fallschirm-Panzer-Ausbildungs und Ersatz-Regiment "Hermann Göring" (Note: According to Scherzer as commander of the I./Fallschirm-Panzer-Ersatz und Ausbildungs-Regiment "Hermann Göring".)	28 January 1945	—	—
Rainer Winckler	Heer	Hauptmann	Leader of the III./Grenadier-Regiment 57	21 October 1943	—	—
Anton Windbiel	Heer	Hauptmann	Commander of the III./Jäger-Regiment 56	21 November 1942	—	—
Alois Windisch	Heer	Oberst	Commander of Gebirgsjäger-Regiment 139	20 June 1940	—	—
Johann Windisch	Heer	Obergefreiter	Group leader in the 5./Grenadier-Regiment 519	18 November 1943	—	—
Erich Windmann	Heer	Oberst	Artilleriekommandeur 35	6 November 1944	—	—
Harald Windschügl	Heer	Major	Division adjutant of the 227. Infanterie-Division (Note: According to Scherzer as division adjutant (IIa)/227. Infanterie-Division.)	14 April 1945*	Killed in action 21 March 1945	—
Peter Windschüttl	Heer	Unteroffizier of the Reserves (Note: According to Scherzer as Unteroffizier and Geschützführer (gun layer) in the 14./Grenadier-Regiment 72.)	Geschützführer (gun layer) in the 14.(Panzerjäger)/Grenadier-Regiment 72	22 July 1943	—	—
Kurt Winkler	Heer	Oberstleutnant	Commander of Grenadier-Regiment 101	17 March 1945	—	—
Rudolf Winnerl	Luftwaffe	Oberfeldwebel	Pilot in the 4./Kampfgeschwader 1 "Hindenburg"	18 April 1943 (Note: According to Scherzer on 16 April 1943.)	—	—
Friedrich Winter	Luftwaffe	Feldwebel	Pilot in the 2.(H)/Aufklärungs-Gruppe 16 (Note: According to Scherzer on 18 November 1944 as pilot in the Nahaufklärungsstaffel 2./16.)	6 December 1944	—	—
Kurt Winter	Heer	Major	Commander of the III./Jäger-Regiment 83	2 September 1944	—	—
Michael Winter	Heer	Unteroffizier	Geschützführer (gun layer) in the 14.(Panzerjäger)/Grenadier-Regiment 168 (Note: According to Scherzer as Geschützführer (gun layer) in the 14./Grenadier-Regiment 168.)	9 June 1944	—	—
Werner Winter	Kriegsmarine	Kapitänleutnant	Commander of U-103	5 June 1942	—	—
Hild-Wilfried von Winterfeld	Heer	Oberstleutnant	Commander of the I./Panzer-Regiment 24	22 January 1943	—	—
Alexander von Winterfeldt	Luftwaffe	Major of the Reserves	Gruppenkommandeur of the III./Jagdgeschwader 77	5 July 1941	—	—
Karl Winterhoff	Heer	Leutnant of the Reserves	Zugführer (platoon leader) of the 3./Panzergrenadier-Regiment 115	18 December 1944	—	—
Eduard Wintershoff	Heer	Unteroffizier	Geschützführer (gun layer) in the 2./Panzer-Jäger-Abteilung 8	25 August 1942	—	—
Karl Winzen	Heer	Oberstleutnant	Commander of Grenadier-Regiment 289	20 October 1944	—	—
Willy Winzer	Heer	Oberst	Commander of Infanterie-Regiment 578	3 November 1942*	Killed in action 17 October 1942	—
Franz Wipfler	Heer	Feldwebel	Zugführer (platoon leader) in the 11./Jäger-Regiment 56	15 May 1942	—	—
Max Wippermann	Luftwaffe	Oberleutnant	Zugführer (platoon leader) in the 7./Flak-Regiment 4 (motorized) (Note: According to Scherzer as Zugführer (platoon leader) in the 7./Flak-Regiment 4.)	16 November 1942	—	—
[Dr.] Maximilian Wirsching	Heer	Oberleutnant	Chief of the 2./schwere Panzer-Abteilung 507	7 February 1945	—	—
Georg Wirth	Heer	Feldwebel	Zugführer (platoon leader) in the 14.(Panzerjäger)/Grenadier-Regiment 21 (Note: According to Scherzer as Zugführer (platoon leader) in the 14./Grenadier-Regiment 21.)	22 October 1943	—	—
Theodor Wisch+	Waffen-SS	SS-Sturmbannführer	Commander of the II./"Leibstandarte SS Adolf Hitler"	15 September 1941	Awarded 393rd Oak Leaves 12 February 1944; 94th Swords 30 August 1944	—
Dr. med. Werner Wischhusen	Heer	Oberfeldarzt (rank equivalent to Oberstleutnant)	Division doctor in the 22. Infanterie-Division (Note: According to Scherzer as division doctor in the (IVb)/22. Infanterie-Division (LL).)	26 May 1940	—	—
Hermann Wischnewski	Luftwaffe	Fahnenjunker-Oberfeldwebel	Pilot in the 2./Jagdgeschwader 300	16 December 1944	—	—
Günther-Eberhardt Wisliceny+	Waffen-SS	SS-Sturmbannführer	Commander of the III./SS-Panzergrenadier-Regiment "Deutschland"	30 July 1943	Awarded 687th Oak Leaves 26 December 1944 (151st) Swords 6 May 1945? (Note: No evidence of the award can be found in the German Federal Archives. The award was unlawfully presented by SS-Oberstgruppenführer Sepp Dietrich. The date is taken from the announcement made by the 6. SS-Panzerarmee. The sequential number "151" was assigned by the Association of Knight's Cross Recipients (AKCR). Wisliceny was member of the AKCR.)	A man in semi profile wearing a military uniform. His hair is combed back and his facial expression is determined.
Hans-Joachim Wissemann	Heer	Hauptmann	Chief of the 2./Kradschützen-Bataillon 6	8 February 1943*	Killed in action 30 December 1942	—
Rudolf Witsch	Heer	Leutnant of the Reserves	Zugführer (platoon leader) of the 7./Grenadier-Regiment 308	3 September 1942	—	—
Kurt Witschel+	Heer	Oberfeldwebel	Leader of the 2./Jäger-Regiment 28	4 January 1943	Awarded 773rd Oak Leaves 11 March 1945	—
Fritz Witt+	Waffen-SS	SS-Sturmbannführer	Commander of the I./SS-Infanterie-Regiment "Deutschland" (Note: According to Scherzer as commander of the I./SS-Standarte "Deutschland".)	4 September 1940	Awarded 200th Oak Leaves 1 March 1943	
Hans Witt	Kriegsmarine	Kapitänleutnant	Commander of U-129	17 December 1942	—	—
Heinrich Witt	Kriegsmarine	Oberleutnant (M.A.) of the Reserves	Chief of Battery "Sagorsch" in the Marine-Flak-Abteilung 259 (Marine-Flak-Regiment 9) (Note: According to Scherzer as chief 4 (Battery "Sagorsch")/Marine-Flak-Abteilung 259 in Gotenhafen.)	20 April 1945	—	—
Heinz Witt	Heer	Feldwebel	Zugführer (platoon leader) of the 2./Grenadier-Regiment 4	5 September 1944	—	—
Hellmuth Witt	Heer	Oberst	Commander of Artillerie-Regiment 134	27 July 1944	—	—
Hermann Witt	Kriegsmarine	Fregattenkapitän	Harbour commander of Cherbourg	24 September 1944	—	—
Otto Witt	Heer	Feldwebel	Zugführer (platoon leader) of the 8./Grenadier-Regiment 43	21 September 1944	—	—
Heinz Wittchow von Brese-Winiary+	Heer	Hauptmann	Commander of the I./Panzergrenadier-Regiment 108	15 May 1943	Awarded 441st Oak Leaves 6 April 1944	—
Albert Witte	Heer	Oberwachtmeister	Zugführer (platoon leader) in the 1./Sturmgeschütz-Brigade 394 (Note: According to Scherzer as Zugführer (platoon leader) in the 1./Heeres-Sturmgeschütz-Brigade 394.)	11 March 1945	—	—
Gerhard Witte	Heer	Major	Commander of the II./Panzergrenadier-Regiment 25	23 August 1944	—	—
Heinrich Witte	Luftwaffe	Obergefreiter	Richtkanonier (gunner) in the 7./Flak-Regiment "Hermann Göring"	18 May 1943*	Killed in action 8 May 1943	—
Helmut Witte	Kriegsmarine	Kapitänleutnant	Commander of U-159	22 October 1942	—	
Heinz-Willi Wittenstein	Heer	Hauptmann	Commander of the II./Panzergrenadier-Regiment 146	14 February 1945	—	—
Hans Wittenzeller	Heer	Oberfeldwebel	Zugführer (platoon leader) in the 1./Gebirgsjäger-Regiment 144	9 June 1944	—	—
Leo-Volkhard Freiherr von Wittgenstein	Heer	Hauptmann	Commander of the III./Grenadier-Regiment 410	6 April 1943	—	—
Joachim Witthöft	Heer	Generalleutnant	Commander of the 86. Infanterie-Division	14 December 1941	—	—
Karl-Friedrich Wittholz	Heer	Leutnant of the Reserves	Zugführer (platoon leader) in the 6./Panzer-Regiment 36	7 December 1942	—	—
Hans-Karl Wittig	Luftwaffe	Feldwebel	Leader of the 11./Fallschirmjäger-Regiment 1	5 February 1944	—	—
Kaspar Wittkamp	Heer	Feldwebel	In the 4.(MG)/Grenadier-Regiment 77 (Note: According to Scherzer in the 4./Grenadier-Regiment 77.)	18 October 1943	—	—
Heinrich Wittkopf	Heer	Oberst	Commander of Infanterie-Regiment 530	29 September 1941	—	—
Alfred Wittmann	Heer	Oberstleutnant	Commander of Grenadier-Regiment 546	15 May 1944	—	—
August Wittmann	Heer	Oberstleutnant	Commander of Gebirgs-Artillerie-Regiment 95	21 June 1941	—	—
Herbert Wittmann+	Luftwaffe	Hauptmann	Staffelkapitän of the Stabsstaffel/Kampfgeschwader 53 "Legion Condor"	23 November 1941	Awarded 735th Oak Leaves 11 February 1945	—
Michael Wittmann+	Waffen-SS	SS-Untersturmführer (Note: According to Scherzer as SS-Untersturmführer of the Reserves and Zugführer (platoon leader) in the 13.(schwere)/SS-Panzer-Regiment 1.)	Zugführer (platoon leader) in the 13.(schwere)/SS-Panzer-Regiment 1 "Leibstandarte SS Adolf Hitler"	14 January 1944	Awarded 380th Oak Leaves 30 January 1944; 71st Swords 22 June 1944	A man wearing a black military uniform, peaked cap and a neck order in the shape of a cross. His cap has an emblem in shape of a human skull and crossed bones.
Heinrich Wittmer	Luftwaffe	Hauptmann	Gruppenkommandeur of the III./Kampfgeschwader 55	12 November 1941	—	—
Josef Wittrock	Heer	Leutnant of the Reserves	Leader of the 1./Grenadier-Regiment 453	10 September 1944	—	—
Dietrich Witzel (Note: Dietrich Kirn was a cover name used while serving in the Abwehr (military intelligence). His real name is Dietrich Witzel. The Association of Knight's Cross Recipients (AKCR) lists him under his cover name. He is therefore not counted here, see List of Knight's Cross of the Iron Cross recipients (Ka–Km) instead.)	—	—	—	—	See Dietrich Kirn	—
Kurt von Witzendorff	Heer	Oberleutnant	Chief of the 13./Infanterie-Regiment 178	30 August 1941	—	—
Rudolf Witzig+	Luftwaffe	Oberleutnant	Leader of Sturmgruppe "Granit" in the Fallschirmjäger-Sturm-Abteilung "Koch"	10 May 1940	Awarded 662nd Oak Leaves 25 November 1944	—
Erwin von Witzleben? (Note: Generalfeldmarschall Erwin von Witzleben, in connection with the 20 July plot, the failed attempt to assassinate Adolf Hitler, was deprived of all honors, ranks and orders and dishonourably discharged from the Heer on 4 August 1944. The civilian von Witzleben was sentenced to death by the Volksgerichtshof on 8 August 1944.)	Heer	Generaloberst	Commander-in-Chief of the 1. Armee	24 June 1940	—	A man wearing a military uniform and neck order in the shape of a cross.
Henning von Witzleben	Heer	Major	Commander of Panzer-Aufklärungs-Abteilung 16	6 February 1942	—	—
Albert Wodrig	Heer	General der Artillerie	Commanding general of the XXVI. Armeekorps	19 July 1940	—	—
Edmund Woehl? (Note: No evidence of the award can be found in the German Federal Archives. There is also no evidence in the files of the Order Commission of the Association of Knight's Cross Recipients (AKCR). Edmund Woehl's presentation is also not mentioned in the contemporary printed press such as the Völkischer Beobachter or the Flensburger Nachrichten. It remains unclear on what grounds the AKCR has listed Woehl. Listed as Eduard Wöhl who received the Knight's Cross of the Iron Cross on 30 April 1945 as Major and leader of Panzergrenadier-Regiment 51 by Gerhard von Seemen. Von Seemen states that this was a presentation in the "greater combat area of Berlin". Therefore a legal presentation via the command chain (LVI Panzer Korps – Combat commander of Berlin (General Helmuth Weidling) – Chief of the Heerespersonalamt (HPA—Branch of the Army Staff Office) Wilhelm Burgdorf – Adolf Hitler) is possible. Also possible is a direct presentation by Hitler. However, none of this can be verified.)	Heer	Oberstleutnant	Commander of Panzergrenadier-Regiment 30	28 April 1945	—	—
Otto Wöhler+	Heer	General der Infanterie	Commanding general of the I. Armeekorps	14 August 1943	Awarded 671st Oak Leaves 28 November 1944	A man wearing a military uniform with an Iron Cross displayed at the front of his uniform collar.
Ulrich Wöhnert	Luftwaffe	Leutnant	Pilot in the 5./Jagdgeschwader 54	6 December 1944	—	—
Erich Woelfel	Heer	Oberstleutnant	Commander of Infanterie-Regiment 534	28 January 1943	—	—
Heinrich Wohlers	Luftwaffe	Hauptmann	Gruppenkommandeur of the I./Nachtjagdgeschwader 6	31 December 1943	—	—
Helmut Wohlfahrt	Heer	Oberst	Commander of Grenadier-Regiment 110	29 August 1943 (Note: According to Scherzer on 27 August 1943.)	—	—
Herbert Wohlfarth	Kriegsmarine	Kapitänleutnant	Commander of U-556	15 May 1941	—	—
Otto Wohlfeil	Heer	Hauptmann	Commander of the I./Grenadier-Regiment 371	5 September 1943	—	—
Karl von Wohlgemuth	Heer	Major	Commander of Divisions-Füsilier-Bataillon 1 (Note: According to Scherzer as commander of Divisions-Füsilier-Bataillon (A.A.) 1.)	30 September 1944	—	—
Franz Woidich	Luftwaffe	Leutnant of the Reserves (Note: According to Scherzer as Leutnant.)	Pilot in the 3./Jagdgeschwader 52	11 June 1944	—	—
Alfred Wojak	Heer	Oberleutnant	Chief of the 11./Panzer-Artillerie-Regiment 73	9 June 1944	—	—
Bernhard Woldenga	Luftwaffe	Major	Geschwaderkommodore of Jagdgeschwader 77	5 July 1941	—	
Adolf Wolf	Luftwaffe	Oberstleutnant	Commander of the I./Flak-Regiment 64 (motorized) (Note: According to Scherzer as commander of the I./Flak-Regiment 64.)	20 June 1940	—	—
Adolf Wolf	Heer	Hauptmann	Commander of the I./Infanterie-Regiment 431	11 October 1941	—	—
Albin Wolf+	Luftwaffe	Oberfeldwebel	Pilot in the 6./Jagdgeschwader 54 (Note: According to Scherzer as pilot in the II./Jagdgeschwader 54 and posthumously the 464th Oak Leaves on 25 April 1944.)	22 November 1943	Awarded 464th Oak Leaves 27 April 1944	—
Alfred Wolf	Heer	Major	Commander of the I./Panzer-Regiment 23	15 April 1944	—	—
Alois Wolf	Heer	Hauptmann	Chief of the 3./Pionier-Bataillon 161	14 February 1945	—	—
Cosmas Wolf	Heer	Oberfeldwebel	Company troop leader in the 3./Grenadier-Regiment 279	25 January 1945	—	—
Eberhard Wolf (Note: According to Scherzer name is spelled Eberhard Wolff.)	Heer	Hauptmann	Commander of Heeres-Pionier-Bataillon 505	20 July 1944	—	—
Hermann Wolf	Luftwaffe	Leutnant	Pilot in the 9./Jagdgeschwader 11	24 April 1945	—	—
Karl Wolf	Heer	Unteroffizier	Group leader in the II./Grenadier-Regiment 432	28 February 1945	—	—
Richard Wolf	Heer	Oberstleutnant	Commander of Grenadier-Regiment 208	20 January 1943	—	—
Richard Wolf	Heer	Leutnant	In the Kampfgruppe "Tenschert" in the fortress Breslau	4 March 1945	—	—
Walter Wolf	Heer	Oberfeldwebel	Zugführer (platoon leader) in the 4./Panzer-Regiment 35	16 October 1944*	Killed in action 18 September 1944 (Note: According to Scherzer on 17 September 1944.)	—
Werner Wolf	Heer	Hauptmann of the Reserves	Leader of MG-Bataillon 420 (Note: According to Scherzer as leader of Korps-MG-Bataillon 420.)	18 February 1945	—	—
Wilhelm Wolf	Heer	Stabsfeldwebel	Zugführer (platoon leader) in the 2./Panzer-Abteilung 103	7 August 1942	—	—
Dr. Gottlieb Wolff	Luftwaffe	Oberst	Geschwaderkommodore of Kampfgeschwader 4 "General Wever" (Note: According to Scherzer as Geschwaderkommodore of Kampfgeschwader 4.)	5 January 1943	—	—
Hans Freiherr von Wolff+	Heer	Hauptmann	Commander of the I./Schützen-Regiment 8	13 July 1940	Awarded 61st Oak Leaves 16 January 1942	
Hans Wolff	Luftwaffe	Hauptmann	Staffelkapitän of the 1.(F)/Aufklärungs-Gruppe 124 (Note: According to Scherzer on 14 January 1942 as Staffelkapitän of the Aufklärungsstaffel 1.(F)/124.)	12 January 1942	—	—
Hans Wolff (Note: According to Scherzer name is spelled Hanns Wolff. The brackets around the doctor title [Dr.] denotes that the academic title was attained after the Knight's Cross of the Iron Cross was awarded.)	Heer	Oberleutnant	Leader of the 3./Infanterie-Bataillon z.b.V. 540	8 February 1943	—	—
Heinz Wolff	Heer	Hauptmann of the Reserves	Leader of the I./Panzergrenadier-Regiment 110	12 December 1944	—	—
Horst von Wolff	Heer	Oberst	Commander of Infanterie-Regiment 478	10 October 1941	—	—
Joachim-Helmut Wolff	Heer	Oberstleutnant	Commander of Grenadier-Regiment "Feldherrnhalle"	21 January 1945	—	—
Kurt Wolff	Heer	Hauptmann	Commander of the I./Grenadier-Regiment 415	30 November 1943*	Killed in action 12 October 1943	—
Ludwig Wolff+	Heer	Oberst	Commander of Infanterie-Regiment 192	26 May 1940	Awarded 100th Oak Leaves 22 June 1942	A black-and-white photograph of a man in semi profile wearing a military uniform and a neck order in shape of an Iron Cross. His hair appears blond and is combed back.
Max-Eckart Wolff	Kriegsmarine	Korvettenkapitän	Commander of destroyer Georg Thiele (Z-2)	4 August 1940	—	—
Otto Wolff	Heer	Oberleutnant of the Reserves	Chief of the 3./Divisions-Füsilier-Bataillon 263 (Note: According to Scherzer as chief of the 3./Divisions-Füsilier-Bataillon (A.A.) 263.)	29 February 1944	—	—
Richard Wolff	Heer	Feldwebel	Zugführer (platoon leader) in the 1./Füsilier-Regiment 202	12 March 1944	—	—
Werner Wolff	Waffen-SS	SS-Untersturmführer	Adjutant of the III.(gepanzert)/SS-Panzergrenadier-Regiment "Leibstandarte SS Adolf Hitler" (Note: According to Scherzer as adjutant of the III./2. SS-Panzergrenadier-Regiment "Leibstandarte SS Adolf Hitler".)	7 August 1943	—	A man wearing a military uniform and a neck order in the shape of a cross.
Wilhelm Wolff	Luftwaffe	Oberst	Commander of Flak-Regiment 37 (motorized) (Note: According to Scherzer as commander of Flak-Regiment 37.)	24 January 1943	—	—
Wilhelm Wolff	Heer	Oberleutnant of the Reserves	Chief of the 10./Panzer-Regiment 36	9 December 1943*	Died of wounds 31 October 1943	—
Eberhard Wolfram	Kriegsmarine	Konteradmiral	Befehshaber der Sicherung der Nordsee (Commander-in-Chief of the security North Sea)	25 May 1941	—	—
Eberhard Wolfram	Heer	Hauptmann	Chief of the 4./Infanterie-Regiment 82	13 November 1942	—	—
Walter Wolfrum	Luftwaffe	Leutnant	Pilot in the 5./Jagdgeschwader 52 (Note: According to Scherzer as pilot in the I./Jagdgeschwader 52.)	27 July 1944	—	—
Erich Wolkewitz	Heer	Oberst	Commander of Grenadier-Regiment 478 (Note: According to Scherzer as commander of Grenadier-Regiment 479.)	30 April 1943	—	—
Balthasar Woll	Waffen-SS	SS-Rottenführer	Richtschütze (gunner) in the 13.(schwere)/SS-Panzer-Regiment 1 "Leibstandarte SS Adolf Hitler" (Note: According to Scherzer as Richtschütze (gunner) in the 13.(schwere)/SS-Panzer-Regiment 1.)	16 January 1944	—	—
Artur Wollschläger	Heer	Oberleutnant	Chief of the 2./Panzer-Regiment 35	12 January 1942	—	—
Herbert Wollschlaeger	Heer	Leutnant of the Reserves	Battery officer in the Artillerie-Regiment 32	22 October 1943	—	—
Alwin Wolz	Luftwaffe	Oberst	Commander of Flak-Regiment 135 (motorized) (Note: According to Scherzer on 10 June 1943 as commander of Flak-Regiment 135.)	4 June 1943	—	—
Hermann Wonde	Heer	Leutnant	Leader of the 6./Reiter-Regiment 41	23 March 1945	—	—
Kurt Wontorra	Heer	Hauptmann of the Reserves	Leader of the II./Grenadier-Regiment 239	21 July 1943*	Killed in action 16 July 1943	—
Heinz Woock	Heer	Hauptmann	Commander of the III./Grenadier-Regiment 274	18 July 1944	—	—
Karl-Heinz Worthmann	Waffen-SS	SS-Hauptscharführer	Zugführer (platoon leader) in the 6./SS-Panzer-Regiment 2 "Das Reich" (Note: According to Scherzer as Zugführer (platoon leader) in the 6./SS-Panzer-Regiment 2.)	31 March 1943	—	A man wearing a military uniform and a neck order in the shape of a cross.
Alois Wosnitza	Luftwaffe	Oberfeldwebel	Pilot in the 6./Schlachtgeschwader 77 (Note: According to Scherzer as pilot in the 6./Sturzkampfgeschwader 77.)	26 March 1944	—	—
Gustav Woszczella	Heer	Leutnant	Leader of the 8.(MG)/Grenadier-Regiment 208 (Note: According to Scherzer as leader of the 8./Grenadier-Regiment 208.)	4 July 1944	—	—
Werner Wrangel	Heer	Gefreiter	Richtschütze (gunner) in the 1./Panzer-Jäger-Abteilung 183	8 February 1943	—	—
Theodor Freiherr von Wrede	Heer	Generalleutnant	Commander of the 290. Infanterie-Division	22 February 1942	—	—
Walter Wriedt	Heer	Oberfeldwebel	Zugführer (platoon leader) of the 13./Gebirgsjäger-Regiment 138	25 October 1943	—	—
Günther Wrona	Heer	Hauptmann of the Reserves	Commander of Divisions-Füsilier-Bataillon 176	4 May 1944	—	—
Alfred Wünnenberg+	Waffen-SS	SS-Standartenführer and Oberst of the Schupo	Commander of SS-Polizei-Schützen-Regiment 3	15 November 1941	Awarded 91st Oak Leaves 23 April 1942	A black-and-white photograph of a man wearing a military uniform and a neck order in shape of an Iron Cross.
Joachim Wünning	Kriegsmarine	Korvettenkapitän of the Reserves	Commander of Minenschiff Drache	22 October 1944*	Killed in action 22 September 1944	—
Max Wünsche+	Waffen-SS	SS-Sturmbannführer	Commander of the I./SS-Panzer-Regiment 1 "Leibstandarte SS Adolf Hitler" (Note: According to Scherzer as commander of the I./SS-Panzer-Regiment 1.)	28 February 1943	Awarded 548th Oak Leaves 11 August 1944	A man wearing a military uniform with an Iron Cross displayed at the front of his uniform collar.
Erich Würdemann	Kriegsmarine	Kapitänleutnant	Commander of U-506	14 March 1943	—	—
Otto Würfel	Luftwaffe	Oberfeldwebel	Pilot in the 9./Jagdgeschwader 51 "Mölders" (Note: According to Scherzer as pilot in the 8./Jagdgeschwader 51 "Mölders".)	4 May 1944	—	—
Albrecht Wüstenhagen	Heer	Oberst	Commander of Artillerie-Regiment 129	2 December 1942	—	—
Albrecht Wüstenhagen	Heer	Hauptmann	Leader of a schwere Infanteriegeschütz-Kompanie/fortress Küstrin (Note: According to Scherzer as leader of a Infanteriegeschütz-Kompanie in the fortress Küstrin.)	14 April 1945	—	—
[Dr.] Hermann Wulf	Heer	Oberleutnant	Chief of the 9./Infanterie-Regiment 76 (motorized)	13 October 1941	Awarded 520th Oak Leaves 3 July 1944	—
Rudolf Wulf+	Heer	Major	Leader of Infanterie-Regiment 422	13 November 1942	Awarded 556th Oak Leaves 19 August 1944	—
Erich Wulff	Kriegsmarine	Oberleutnant zur See	Commander of Vorpostenboot VP-18 in the 18. Vorpostenflottille (Note: According to Scherzer as commander in the 18. Vorpostenflottille.)	24 April 1944	—	—
Erich Wulff? (Note: The nomination by the troop is not documented. A file card indicates that it was received on 23 February 1945. SS-Obersturmbannführer Wilhelm Kment, the adjutant of Heinrich Himmler and liaison officer to the Heerespersonalamt (HPA—Army Staff Office), noted that he did return the Himmler approved nomination on 29 April 1945 to the HPA/P5a (Army personnel office). Three copies for further processing were retained by the HPA but were left unfinished by the end of the war. Missing is the confirmation of the Commander-in-Chief of the 9. Armee and Army Group Vistula. The nomination did not receive a sequential number. The book "Verliehene Ritterkreuze" (Awarded Knight Crosses) does not list Erich Wulff. The nomination remained unfinished by the end of the war. The file card also contains a note "unfinished". A further file card can be found in the record for rejected or unfinished nominations. Mr Meentz of the German Federal Archives stated on 20 July 2004 that it cannot be verified that Wulff received the Knight's Cross.)	Waffen-SS	SS-Sturmbannführer	Ia (operations officer) in the 15. Waffen-Grenadier-Division of the SS	9 May 1945*	Killed in action 3 February 1945	—
Hermann Wulff	Heer	Leutnant of the Reserves	Zugführer (platoon leader) in the 2./Grenadier-Regiment 333	19 October 1944	—	—
Karl Wulff	Luftwaffe	Oberleutnant	Pilot and observer in the 12.(H)/Aufklärungs-Gruppe 13 (Note: According to Scherzer as pilot and observer in the Aufklärungsstaffel 12.(H)/13.)	29 October 1944	—	—
Karl-Heinz Wunberger	Heer	Hauptmann	Leader of the I./Grenadier-Regiment 96	17 March 1944*	Died of wounds 16 March 1944	—
Achim Wunderlich	Heer	Major	Commander of Divisions-Füsilier-Bataillon 205	31 December 1944	—	—
Friedrich Wunderlich	Kriegsmarine	Korvettenkapitän zur Verwendung (for disposition)	Chief of the 14. U-Jagd-Flottille	3 December 1942	—	—
Heinrich Wunn	Heer	Leutnant of the Reserves (Note: According to Scherzer as Leutnant.)	Leader of the 7./Grenadier-Regiment 147	11 June 1944	—	—
Heinz Wunram	Heer	Oberfeldwebel	Company troop leader in the 2./Grenadier-Regiment 220	5 January 1944	—	—
Siegfried Wuppermann+	Kriegsmarine	Oberleutnant zur See	Commander of Schnellboot S-60 in the 3. Schnellbootflottille (Note: According to Scherzer as commander of Schnellboot S-60.)	3 August 1941	Awarded 226th Oak Leaves 14 April 1943	—
Franz Wurdak	Heer	Feldwebel of the Reserves (Note: According to Scherzer as Feldwebel and Zugführer (platoon leader) in the 4./Divisions-Bataillon 137.)	Zugführer (platoon leader) in the 4./Pionier-Bataillon 137	13 September 1943	—	—
Walter Wurl	Heer	Oberfeldwebel	Zugführer (platoon leader) in the 2./Grenadier-Regiment 509	18 February 1945*	Killed in action 7 February 1945	—
Josef Wurmheller+	Luftwaffe	Oberfeldwebel	Pilot in the 9./Jagdgeschwader 2 "Richthofen" (Note: According to Scherzer as pilot in the 5./Jagdgeschwader 2 "Richthofen" and 146th Oak Leaves on 14 November 1942.)	4 September 1941	Awarded 146th Oak Leaves 13 November 1942; 108th Swords 24 October 1944	—
Rolf Wuthmann	Heer	General der Artillerie	Commanding general of the IX. Armeekorps	22 August 1944	—	—
Bernhard Wutka	Luftwaffe	Oberleutnant	Staffelkapitän of the 8./Sturzkampfgeschwader 2 "Immelmann"	16 November 1942	—	—
[Dr.] Otto Wutzel	Heer	Hauptmann	Leader of the I./Grenadier-Regiment 81	14 April 1945	—	—
Georg Wyczisk	Heer	Obergefreiter	Geschützführer (gun layer) in the 1./Panzer-Jäger-Abteilung 53	2 September 1942	—	—
