= General Wagner =

General Wagner may refer to:

- Arthur L. Wagner (1853–1905), U.S. Army brigadier general
- Eduard Wagner (1894–1944), German Wehrmacht general
- George D. Wagner (1829–1869), Union Army brigadier general
- Gustav Wagner (Wehrmacht) (1890–1951), German Wehrmacht major general
- Hans Wagner (general) (1896–1967), German Wehrmacht lieutenant general
- Herbert Wagner (general) (1896–1968), German Wehrmacht lieutenant general
- Jürgen Wagner (1901–1947), German Waffen-SS general
- Kurt Wagner (general) (1904–1989), German National People's Army colonel general
- Louis C. Wagner Jr. (born 1932), U.S. Army four-star general

== See also ==
- Carl Wagener (1901–1988), German Wehrmacht major general
- Otto Wagener (1888–1971), German Wehrmacht major general
