= Karl Willius =

German World War II fighter pilot (1919–1944)

- Born: 5 November 1919; Mainz-Kostheim, Germany
- Died: 8 April 1944 (aged 24) over Zuiderzee, Netherlands
- Cause of death: Killed in action
- Burial place: Ysselsteyn German war cemetery, Netherlands
- Military career
- Allegiance: Nazi Germany
- Branch: Luftwaffe
- Service years: ?–1944
- Rank: Oberleutnant (Posthumously)
- Units: JG 51; JG 26
- Conflicts: World War II: Battle of Britain; Operation Barbarossa; Defense of the Reich
- Awards: Knight's Cross of the Iron Cross

Karl-Heinz "Charly" Willius (5 November 1919 – 8 April 1944) was a German Luftwaffe military aviator and fighter ace during World War II. He is credited with 50 aerial victories achieved in 371 combat missions. This figure includes 17 aerial victories on the Eastern Front, and further 33 victories over the Western Allies, including 11 four-engined bombers.

Born in Mainz-Kostheim, Willius grew up in the Weimar Republic and Nazi Germany. He joined the military service in the Luftwaffe and was trained as a fighter pilot. Following flight training, he served with Jagdgeschwader 51 (JG 51—51st Fighter Wing) during the Battle of France, Battle of Britain and Operation Barbarossa, the German invasion of the Soviet Union. Flying with this wing, Willius claimed his first aerial victory on 18 August 1940 on the Western Front over a Royal Air Force fighter aircraft. In July 1941, he was transferred to Jagdgeschwader 26 "Schlageter" (JG 26—26th Fighter Wing). Elements of JG 26 were moved to the Eastern Front in early 1943 where Willius claimed nine Soviet aircraft destroyed. His unit redeployed to the Western Front in June 1943. In November 1943, he was appointed squadron leader of 2. Staffel (2nd squadron) of JG 26. He was killed in action on 8 April 1944, shot down by a United States Army Air Forces fighter. Posthumously, Willius was awarded the Knight's Cross of the Iron Cross on 9 June 1944.

== World War II ==
Willius was born on 5 November 1919 in Mainz-Kostheim. Following pilot training, Obergefreiter Willius was posted to 2. Staffel (2nd squadron) of Jagdgeschwader 20 (JG 20—20th Fighter Wing). At the time, this squadron was initially commanded by Oberleutnant Albrecht Freiherr von Minnigerode and then by Oberleutnant Fritz Stendel. The Staffel was subordinated to I. Gruppe (1st group) of JG 20 which was commanded by Hauptmann Hannes Trautloft. The Gruppe was equipped with the Messerschmitt Bf 109 E and fought in the Battle of France under the control of Jagdgeschwader 51 (JG 51—51st Fighter Wing). Following the Armistice of 22 June 1940, I. Gruppe of JG 20 was officially integrated into JG 51, becoming its III. Gruppe on 4 July. In consequence, Willius became a member of the 8. Staffel.

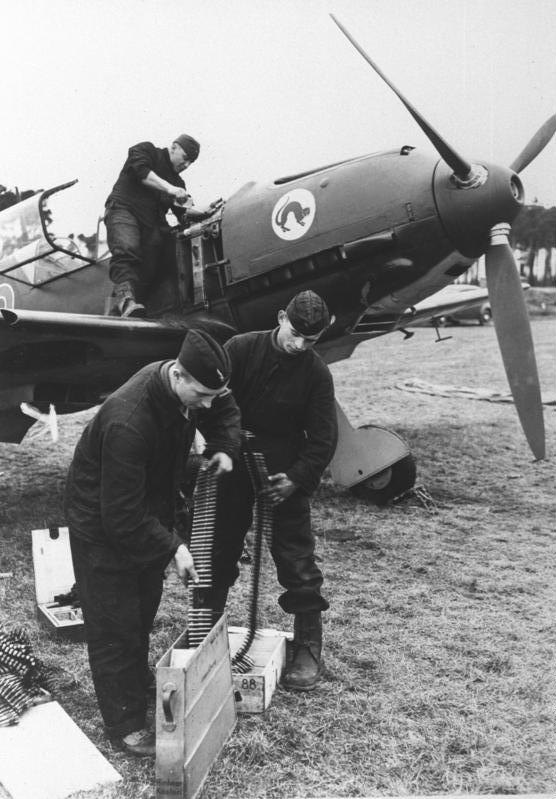
Bf 109 from 2./JG 20

Willius claimed his first aerial victory on 18 August during the Battle of Britain. That day, III. Gruppe flew fighter escort missions for dive bomber and bomber units bombing various targets in Southern England. The Gruppe claimed nine aerial victories over Royal Air Force (RAF) fighters, including a Supermarine Spitfire fighter shot down by Willius over Ramsgate.

Unteroffizier Willius participated in the invasion of Russia in June 1941, and claimed his second victory on the opening day of Operation Barbarossa, when he downed a SB-2 bomber. On 13 July Willius claimed two DB-3 bombers shot down for his 10th and 11th victories.

=== With Jagdgeschwader 26 ===
On 14 July 1941, on request by Oberstleutnant Adolf Galland, who had asked for fighter pilots with experience, Willius was transferred to I. Gruppe of Jagdgeschwader 26 "Schlageter" (JG 26—26th Fighter Wing). At the time of his posting to JG 26, I. Gruppe was commanded by Hauptmann Johannes Seifert, and 3. Staffel, to which Willius was assigned, was headed by Oberleutnant Walter Otte. He claimed his first victory at the English Channel on 8 December, a Spitfire shot down 10 kilometres (6.2 miles) west of Boulogne

On 17 May 1942, he may have been the pilot that downed the Spitfire Vb of No. 91 Squadron RAF flown by Flight Lieutenant Patrick Peter Coleman "Paddy" Barthropp who bailed out and was taken prisoner. The RAF's major operation of the day was "Ramrod" Nr. 33, attacking the docks at Boulogne, escorted by the Hornchurch Wing and Kenley Wing.

He was awarded the German Cross in Gold (Deutsches Kreuz in Gold) on 15 October 1942 for 22 aerial victories. On 16 January 1943, Feldwebel Willius was transferred, serving as an instructor with a fighter pilot school.

=== Eastern Front ===
Following his tour as an instructor, Willius returned to 3. Staffel on 31 March 1943. In January 1943, the Luftwaffe planned to move JG 26 to the Eastern Front. The idea was to exchange JG 26 with Jagdgeschwader 54 (JG 54—54th Fighter Wing) which supported Army Group North. At the time of Willius' return to his unit, the Gruppe was based at Dno and fighting in the vicinity of Demyansk, during and following the Battle of Demyansk in support of the 16th Army and 18th Army.

He claimed nine victories over the Soviet Air Force, including three Pe-2 bombers and a MiG-3 fighter on 13 May. Willius had 33 victories to his credit when I./JG 26 returned to France.

In late May, Major Seifert was replaced by Major Fritz Losigkeit as commander of I. Gruppe. On 6 June, the Gruppe started relocating back to the Western Front, at first to Warsaw, and then to Brandenburg-Briest and Rheine. Before, the relocation was completed, Losigkeit was replaced by Hauptmann Karl Borris as Gruppenkommandeur of I. Gruppe.

=== Squadron leader and death ===
The Gruppe arrived in France on 10 June and was based at an airfield at Poix-de-Picardie. In August, Willius transferred to 2. Staffel of JG 26. On 25 November, Willius was appointed Staffelkapitän of 2. Staffel. He succeeded Major Wilhelm Gäth who was transferred to take command of II. Gruppe of JG 26. On 1 December, Willius claimed his first heavy bomber. That day, he shot down a Boeing B-17 Flying Fortress near Koblenz on a VIII Bomber Command mission to Solingen. On 30 December, VIII Bomber Command targeted Ludwigshafen in southern Germany with approximately 1,300 bombers and escort fighters. To avoid the Luftwaffe defenses in northern Germany, the approach was flown over France. Defending against this attack, I. and II. Gruppe of JG 26 claimed seven aerial victories, including a B-17 shot down by Willius near Soissons. On 11 January 1944, VIII Bomber Command attacked the German aircraft industry at Braunschweig, Oschersleben and Halberstadt. That day, Willius was credited with his third aerial victory in Defense of the Reich, claiming a 306th Bombardment Group B-17 bomber shot down near Deventer.

Leutnant Willius claimed his 40th victory, a B-17 shot down near Cousolre on 4 February 1944. On 24 February, during "Big Week" or Operation Argument, Willius shot down a Consolidated B-24 Liberator bomber on a mission to bomb the German aircraft industry. VIII Bomber Command targeted Frankfurt on 2 March, defending against this attack, Willius was credited with the destruction of a bomber.

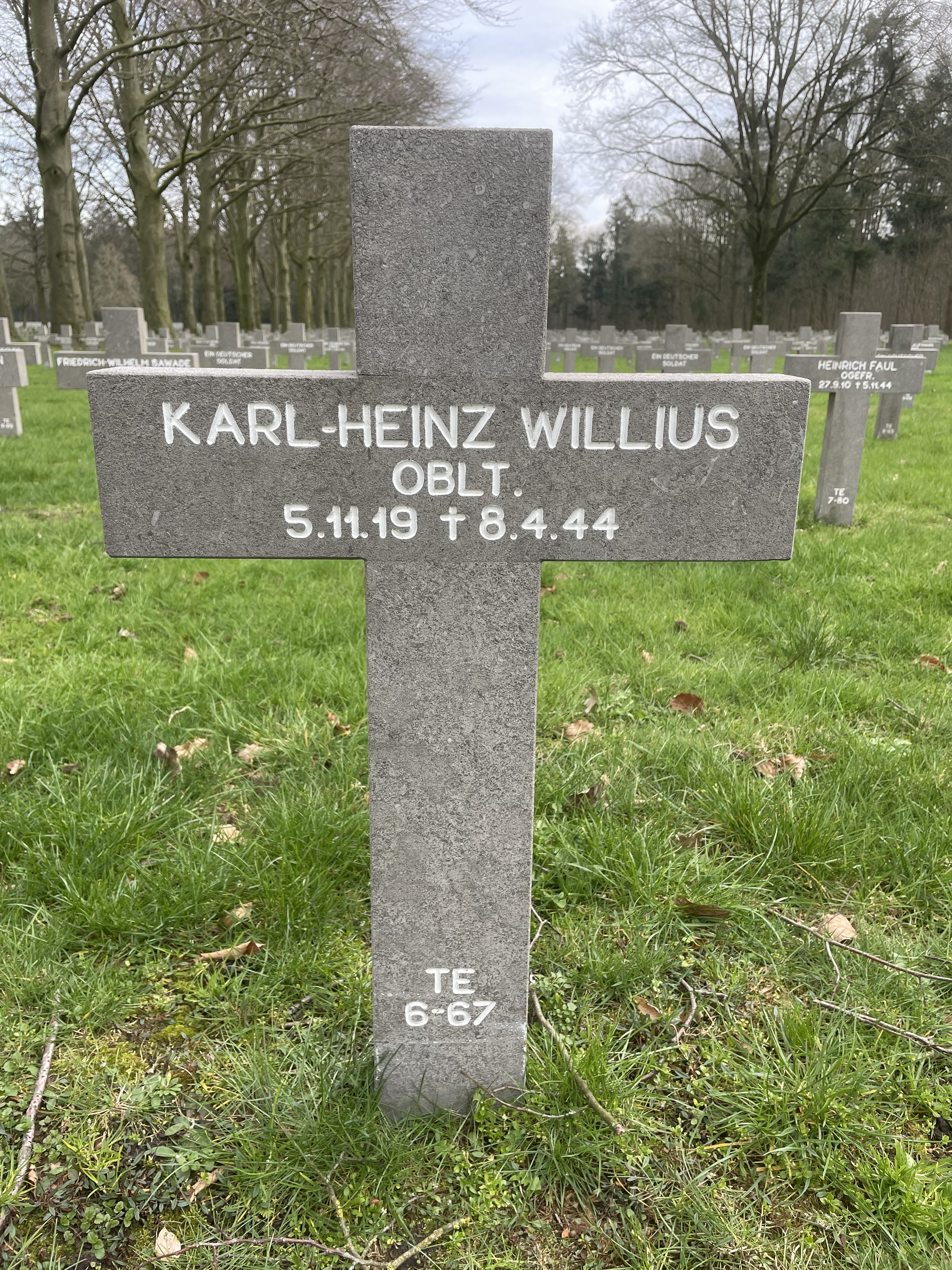
German War Cemetery Ysselsteyn - Karl-Heinz Willius

On 8 April 1944, Willius made a head-on attack against a formation of B-24 bombers of the 44th Bombardment Group, downing one in flames for his 50th and last aerial victory. The Fw 190s reformed as P-47 fighters of the 361st Fighter Group bounced them over Zuiderzee, the Netherlands. Willius' Fw 190 A-8 (Werknummer 170009—factory number) "Black 5" was seen to spin into the ground and explode. Willius was shot down by First Lieutenant Alton B. Snyder. Posthumously, Willius was awarded the Knight's Cross of the Iron Cross (Ritterkreuz des Eisernen Kreuzes), which was presented to his widow Lisette on 9 June 1944. He was also promoted to Oberleutnant posthumously. His body was not recovered until 23 October 1967, found in his aircraft excavated from a Dutch polder near Kamperzeedijk. He was then interred at the Ysselsteyn German war cemetery, Netherlands (Block TE—Row 6—Grave 67).

== Summary of career ==
=== Aerial victory claims ===
According to Obermaier, Willius was credited with 50 aerial victories claimed in 371 combat missions. This figure includes 17 claims on the Eastern Front, 33 claims on the Western Front, including 11 four-engine bombers. Mathews and Foreman, authors of Luftwaffe Aces — Biographies and Victory Claims, researched the German Federal Archives and found records for 49 aerial victory claims, plus four further unconfirmed claims. This figure includes 18 aerial victories on the Eastern Front and 31 over the Western Allies, including 11 four-engined bombers. The first aerial victory listed by Caldwell is dated on 8 December 1941 and is labeled as his 13th aerial victory, his first with JG 26. Authors Prien, Stemmer, Rodeike and Bock, present this claim as his 12th aerial victory, creating a one claim discrepancy in the numbering plan.

Victory claims were logged to a map-reference (PQ = Planquadrat), for example "PQ 35 Ost 4555". The Luftwaffe grid map (Jägermeldenetz) covered all of Europe, western Russia and North Africa and was composed of rectangles measuring 15 minutes of latitude by 30 minutes of longitude, an area of about 360 square miles (930 km^{2}). These sectors were then subdivided into 36 smaller units to give a location area 3 km × 4 km (1.9 mi × 2.5 mi) in size.

Chronicle of aerial victories
This and the – (dash) indicates unconfirmed aerial victory claims for which Willius did not receive credit. This and the ? (question mark) indicates information discrepancies listed by Caldwell, Prien, Stemmer, Rodeike, Bock, Mathews and Foreman.
Claim	Date	Time	Type	Location	Claim	Date	Time	Type	Location
– 8. Staffel of Jagdgeschwader 51 – At the Channel and over England — 26 June 1940 – 26 May 1941
1	18 August 1940	15:09? (Note: According to Mathews and Foreman claimed at 15:05.)	Spitfire	southeast of Ramsgate	3	15 September 1940	15:36	Spitfire	
2	31 August 1940	14:22	Hurricane		4? (Note: According to Mathews and Foreman this claim is unconfirmed.)	30 September 1940	14:56	Spitfire	
– 8. Staffel of Jagdgeschwader 51 – Operation Barbarossa — 22 June – July 1941
5	22 June 1941	12:21	SB-2		9	1 July 1941	08:50? (Note: According to Mathews and Foreman claimed at 08:30.)	SB-2	
6	25 June 1941	12:21	SB-2		10	13 July 1941	09:53	DB-3	
7	30 June 1941	17:25	TB-3 (ANT-6)		11	13 July 1941	19:44? (Note: According to Mathews and Foreman claimed at 19:41.)	DB-3	
8	30 June 1941	17:27	TB-3 (ANT-6)						
– 3. Staffel of Jagdgeschwader 26 "Schlageter" – At the Channel and over England — 14 July – 31 December 1941
12	8 December 1941	15:15	Spitfire	10 km (6.2 mi) west of Boulogne					
– 3. Staffel of Jagdgeschwader 26 "Schlageter" – At the Channel and over England — 1 January – 31 December 1942
13	10 April 1942	17:40	Spitfire	northeast of Calais	19	8 June 1942	13:40	Spitfire	5 km (3.1 mi) southeast of Arques
14	12 April 1942	13:45	Spitfire	3 km (1.9 mi) south of Bourbourg	20	18 August 1942	15:04? (Note: According to Mathews and Foreman claimed at 15:01.)	Spitfire	10 km (6.2 mi) west of Cap Gris-Nez
15	24 April 1942	15:02	Spitfire	east of Calais	21	19 August 1942	11:33	Spitfire	4 km (2.5 mi) southeast of Dieppe
16	27 April 1942	16:02	Spitfire	15 km (9.3 mi) northwest of Dunkirk	22	11 December 1942	12:15	Defiant	3 km (1.9 mi) east of Dungeness
17	17 May 1942	11:40	Spitfire	3 km (1.9 mi) south of Calais	23	12 December 1942	11:43	Spitfire	15 km (9.3 mi) south of Wimereux
18	23 May 1942	12:00	Spitfire	10 km (6.2 mi) north of Calais					
– 3. Staffel of Jagdgeschwader 26 "Schlageter" – Eastern Front — 2 February – 7 June 1943
? (Note: According to Caldwell, Prien, Stemmer, Rodeike and Bock, this claim is attributed to Leutnant Herbert Wilms and not Willius.)	14 March 1943	09:40	Il-2		28	13 May 1943	14:02	MiG-3	PQ 35 Ost 4555
?	14 March 1943	09:45	Il-2		29	27 May 1943	06:29	LaGG-3	PQ 35 Ost 5362
24	21 April 1943? (Note: According to Caldwell claimed on 11 April 1943 over a LaGG-4, which did not exist. Caldwell speculates that this may have been a misidentified Lavochkin La-5. Mathews and Foreman date this claim on 21 April 1943 and refer to it as a Yakovlev Yak-4.)	09:30	LaGG-3?	PQ 35 Ost 1835	30	28 May 1943	11:25	La-5	PQ 35 Ost 63253
25	13 May 1943	05:52	Pe-2	PQ 35 Ost 35431	31	2 June 1943	07:33	LaGG-3	PQ 35 Ost 62189
26	13 May 1943	05:52	Pe-2	PQ 35 Ost 35431	32	2 June 1943	10:38	LaGG-3	PQ 35 Ost 62194
27	13 May 1943	05:58	Pe-2	PQ 35 Ost 35462					
– 2. Staffel of Jagdgeschwader 26 "Schlageter" – Defense of the Reich — 23 June – 31 December 1943
33	30 July 1943	07:05	Boston	PQ 05 Ost S/LJ-1, northwest of Antwerp	36	1 December 1943	11:46? (Note: According to Mathews and Foreman claimed at 11:45.)	B-17	PQ 05 Ost S/PP, Koblenz
34? (Note: This claim is not listed by Prien, Stemmer, Rodeike an Bock. According to Mathews and Foreman this claim is unconfirmed.)	18 August 1943	19:07? (Note: According to Mathews and Foreman claimed at 18:07.)	Spitfire	Ipswich	37	30 December 1943	13:43	B-17	Soissons
35? (Note: According to Caldwell this claim is unconfirmed.)	4 September 1943	19:07? (Note: According to Caldwell claimed at 19:14. According to Mathews and Foreman claimed at 18:14.)	Spitfire	PQ 05 Ost S/MD-8/1, vicinity of Dunkirk					
– 2. Staffel of Jagdgeschwader 26 "Schlageter" – Defense of the Reich — 1 January – 8 April 1944
38	11 January 1944	13:00? (Note: According to Mathews and Foreman claimed at 13:32.)	B-17	Deventer	45	2 March 1944	12:08	B-17	Wiesbaden
39	30 January 1944	13:30? (Note: According to Mathews and Foreman claimed at 13:25.)	P-38	3 km (1.9 mi) north Coesfeld	46	6 March 1944	14:41	B-17	north of Koblenz
40	4 February 1944	13:50	B-17	1 km (0.62 mi) east of Cousolre	47	15 March 1944	12:26? (Note: According to Mathews and Foreman claimed at 14:22.)	B-24	east of Norwich, North Sea
41	6 February 1944	11:21	B-17	3 km (1.9 mi) west of Melun	—	16 March 1944	—	B-17	
42	24 February 1944	13:55	B-24	vicinity of Giessen	48	23 March 1944	11:40	B-17	Tilburg
43	25 February 1944	11:26	B-26	Zeebrugge, North Sea	49	27 March 1944	14:24	P-47	southeast of Dreux
44?	25 February 1944	—	B-26	Zeebrugge, North Sea	50	8 April 1944	15:18	B-24	vicinity of Zwolle

=== Awards and decorations ===
- Flugzeugführerabzeichen
- Front Flying Clasp of the Luftwaffe
- Iron Cross (1939) 2nd and 1st Class
- Honor Goblet of the Luftwaffe on 29 June 1942 as Feldwebel and pilot (Note: According to Obermaier on 22 July 1942.)
- German Cross in Gold on 15 October 1942 as Feldwebel in the 3./Jagdgeschwader 26
- Knight's Cross of the Iron Cross on 9 June 1944 as Oberfeldwebel and Staffelführer of the 2./Jagdgeschwader 26 "Schlageter"
