= Heinz Wernicke =

German fighter ace and Knight's Cross recipient (1920–1944)

- Heinz Wernicke
- Born: 17 October 1920; Berlin, Germany
- Died: 27 December 1944 (aged 24) near Dobele, Reichskommissariat Ostland
- Military career
- Allegiance: Nazi Germany
- Branch: Luftwaffe
- Rank: Leutnant (second lieutenant)
- Units: EJGr Ost, JG 54
- Commands: 1./JG 54
- Conflicts: World War II
- Awards: Knight's Cross of the Iron Cross

Heinz Wernicke (17 October 1920 – 27 December 1944) was a Luftwaffe World War II fighter ace and was credited with 117 aerial victories—that is, 117 aerial combat encounters resulting in the destruction of the enemy aircraft. He was also a recipient of the Knight's Cross of the Iron Cross, the highest award in the military and paramilitary forces of Nazi Germany during World War II. Wernicke was killed in a mid-air collision with his wingman on 27 December 1944.

== Career ==
Wernicke was born on 17 October 1920 in Berlin of the Weimar Republic. He joined the 3. Staffel (3rd squadron) of Jagdgeschwader 54 (JG 54—54th Fighter Wing) in early 1942 as an Unteroffizier (non-commissioned officer). (Note: For an explanation of Luftwaffe unit designations see Organisation of the Luftwaffe during World War II.) JG 54 at the time was stationed at the Eastern Front. In the fall of 1942, he was transferred to Ergänzungs-Jagdgruppe Ost (Supplementary Fighter Group East) and then to 6. Staffel (6th squadron) of JG 54 in early 1943. There, he claimed his first aerial victory on 7 March 1943 over an Ilyushin Il-2 ground-attack aircraft in aerial combat south of Lake Ilmen. At the time, II. Gruppe (2nd group) of JG 54 was based at Rjelbitzi, an airfield south of Leningrad. On 11 March, II. Gruppe under the command of Hauptmann (Captain) Heinrich Jung, relocated to Gatchina for combat in the Siege of Leningrad and east in the vicinity of the Volkhov River. In this combat area, Wernicke claimed a Lavochkin-Gorbunov-Gudkov LaGG-3 fighter on 19 March, a Yakovlev Yak-4 light bomber one day later, and another LaGG-3 plus a Curtiss P-40 Warhawk fighter on 27 March, taking his total to five aerial victories.

Following five further victories in June 1943, Wernicke became a fighter pilot instructor and underwent officer training courses. On 4 July 1943, Oberleutnant (First Lieutenant) Horst Ademeit, his Staffelkapitän (squadron leader) of the 6. Staffel, assessed Wernicke concluding that at the time Wernicke required further training to become an officer.

In October 1943, he was back to front line service and claimed his 88th aerial victory on 3 August 1944, and surpassed the century mark—100 aerial victories—in mid-September 1944. He was the 91st Luftwaffe pilot to achieve the century-mark. On 22 February 1944, Wernicke and Oberfeldwebel Fritz Harder suffered carbon monoxide poisoning in their accommodations at the Uman airfield. Wernicke was awarded the Knight's Cross of the Iron Cross (Ritterkreuz des Eisernen Kreuzes) on 30 September 1944 after 112 victories. The presentation was made by General Kurt Pflugbeil.

=== Squadron leader and death ===
On 1 October 1944, Wernicke was appointed Staffelkapitän of the 1. Staffel of JG 54, succeeding Oberleutnant Helmut Wettstein in this capacity. On 27 December, he and his wingman Unteroffizier Gerhard Wollien were killed in a mid-air collision during aerial combat with Yakovlev Yak-9 fighters north of Doblen, present-day Dobele. Command of 1. Staffel then went to Oberleutnant Josef Heinzeller.

== Summary of career ==
=== Aerial victory claims ===
According to US historian David T. Zabecki, Wernicke was credited with 117 aerial victories. Obermaier and Spick also list him with 117 aerial victories, all of which claimed on the Eastern Front. Mathews and Foreman, authors of Luftwaffe Aces — Biographies and Victory Claims, researched the German Federal Archives and found records for 118 aerial victory claims, all of which claimed on the Eastern Front.

Victory claims were logged to a map-reference (PQ = Planquadrat), for example "PQ 35 Ost 18382". The Luftwaffe grid map (Jägermeldenetz) covered all of Europe, western Russia and North Africa and was composed of rectangles measuring 15 minutes of latitude by 30 minutes of longitude, an area of about 360 square miles (930 km^{2}). These sectors were then subdivided into 36 smaller units to give a location area 3 km × 4 km (1.9 mi × 2.5 mi) in size.

Chronicle of aerial victories
This and the ♠ (Ace of spades) indicates those aerial victories which made Wernicke an "ace-in-a-day", a term which designates a fighter pilot who has shot down five or more airplanes in a single day. This and the ? (exclamation mark) indicates information discrepancies listed by Prien, Prien, Stemmer, Rodeike, Balke, Bock, Mathews and Foreman.
Claim	Date	Time	Type	Location	Claim	Date	Time	Type	Location
– 6. Staffel of Jagdgeschwader 54 –
1	7 March 1943	11:47	Il-2	PQ 35 Ost 18382; 45 km (28 mi) north of Chełm	27	15 December 1943	12:40	La-5	PQ 35 Ost 01794; 10 km (6.2 mi) north of Leningrad
2	19 March 1943	13:30	LaGG-3	PQ 36 Ost 00421; Pushkin-Mga	28	15 December 1943	12:45	La-5	PQ 35 Ost 01761; 20 km (12 mi) north-northeast of Leningrad
3	20 March 1943	07:30	Yak-4	PQ 36 Ost 20363; 20 km (12 mi) southeast of Mga	29	9 January 1944	10:15	La-5	PQ 26 Ost 80161 over the Gulf of Finland, northeast of Hungerburg
4	27 May 1943	16:43	LaGG-3	PQ 36 Ost 00274; 15 km (9.3 mi) northeast of Pushkin	30	13 January 1944	15:28	Yak-7	PQ 26 Ost 80682; 30 km (19 mi) east-southeast of Narva
5	27 May 1943	19:53	P-40	PQ 36 Ost 20211 west of Volkhov	31	14 January 1944	09:30	Il-2	PQ 26 Ost 80682; 30 km (19 mi) east-southeast of Narva
6	1 June 1943	04:57	LaGG-3	PQ 36 Ost 20163 south of Volkhov	32	14 January 1944	09:32	Il-2	PQ 26 Ost 80654; 30 km (19 mi) east of Narva
7	8 June 1943	15:59	P-40	PQ 36 Ost 20152 southwest of Volkhov	33	15 January 1944	12:15	Il-2	PQ 26 Ost 90711; 40 km (25 mi) southwest of Lissino
8	17 June 1943	09:23	LaGG-3	PQ 36 Ost 10252; 30 km (19 mi) west-southwest of Schlüsselburg	34	15 January 1944	12:20	Il-2	PQ 26 Ost 90583; 25 km (16 mi) southwest of Lissino
9	18 June 1943	05:59	La-5	PQ 36 Ost 20213 vicinity of Volkhov	35	15 January 1944	12:24	Il-2	PQ 26 Ost 90572; 35 km (22 mi) southwest of Lissino
10	24 June 1943	07:07	La-5	PQ 36 Ost 21793; 15 km (9.3 mi) north of Volkhov	36	22 January 1944	11:56	La-5	PQ 26 Ost 80694; 35 km (22 mi) southwest of Lissino
11	20 October 1943	14:10	Yak-9	southeast of Glebowka	37	24 January 1944	13:56	La-5	PQ 26 Ost 80664; 40 km (25 mi) east of Narva
12	21 October 1943	09:43	Pe-2	east of Gussenoje southeast of Schlüsselburg	38	24 January 1944	14:02	La-5	PQ 26 Ost 90523; 20 km (12 mi) west-northwest of Lissino
13♠	5 November 1943	11:53	Pe-2	PQ 35 Ost 01682; 40 km (25 mi) north-northwest of Schlüsselburg	39	4 February 1944	07:17	Il-2	PQ 35 Ost 09112
14♠	5 November 1943	11:59	Pe-2	PQ 35 Ost 01684; 40 km (25 mi) north-northwest of Schlüsselburg	40	4 February 1944	07:20	La-5	PQ 36 Ost 00771; 30 km (19 mi) south of Siverskij
15♠	5 November 1943	14:25	Il-2	PQ 35 Ost 01564; 45 km (28 mi) northeast of Zelenogorsk	41	9 February 1944	06:32	Pe-2	PQ 35 Ost 09211
16♠	5 November 1943	14:28	Il-2	PQ 35 Ost 01674; 40 km (25 mi) north-northeast of Leningrad	42	9 February 1944	12:25	R-5	PQ 36 Ost 00762; 30 km (19 mi) southeast of Siverskij
17♠	5 November 1943	14:34	Il-2	PQ 35 Ost 01642; 55 km (34 mi) north-northeast of Leningrad	43	12 February 1944	15:25	Yak-9	PQ 36 Ost 10552 vicinity of Lyuban
18	22 November 1943	09:00	Pe-2	PQ 25 Ost 91591; 15 km (9.3 mi) northwest of Zelenogorsk	44♠	16 February 1944	07:11	U-2	PQ 36 Ost 00693; 25 km (16 mi) south of Tosno
19	28 November 1943	10:45	Il-2	PQ 25 Ost 91534; 30 km (19 mi) north of Zelenogorsk	45♠	16 February 1944	07:12	U-2	PQ 36 Ost 00693; 25 km (16 mi) south of Tosno
20	28 November 1943	10:48	Il-2	PQ 25 Ost 91614; 30 km (19 mi) north of Zelenogorsk	46♠	16 February 1944	07:13	U-2	PQ 36 Ost 00694; 25 km (16 mi) south of Tosno
21	28 November 1943	14:53	Il-2	PQ 25 Ost 91591; 15 km (9.3 mi) northwest of Zelenogorsk	47♠	16 February 1944	07:15	U-2	PQ 36 Ost 10573; 10 km (6.2 mi) southwest of Lyuban
22	29 November 1943	14:30	Il-2	PQ 25 Ost 91534; 30 km (19 mi) north of Zelenogorsk	48♠	16 February 1944	07:18	U-2	PQ 36 Ost 10573; 10 km (6.2 mi) southwest of Lyuban
23	29 November 1943	14:32	Il-2	PQ 25 Ost 91614; 30 km (19 mi) north of Zelenogorsk	49♠? (Note: This claim is not listed by Mathews and Foreman.)	16 February 1944	11:20	La-5	PQ 36 Ost 00562
24	29 November 1943	14:33	Il-2	PQ 25 Ost 91621; 30 km (19 mi) north-northeast of Zelenogorsk	50♠	16 February 1944	14:56	Il-2	PQ 36 Ost 00691; 25 km (16 mi) south of Tosno
25	12 December 1943	13:34	La-5	PQ 35 Ost 00171; 10 km (6.2 mi) north of Selo	51	21 February 1944	11:10? (Note: According to Mathews and Foreman claimed at 11:20.)	La-5	PQ 26 Ost 90562; 20 km (12 mi) east of Siverskij
26	14 December 1943	17:05	Il-2	PQ 35 Ost 00154; 10 km (6.2 mi) south of Leningrad	52?	20 April 1944	18:20	unknown	
– 5. Staffel of Jagdgeschwader 54 –
53	17 June 1944	17:55	P-39	PQ 36 Ost 01384; 55 km (34 mi) northeast of Zelenogorsk	? (Note: This claim is not listed by Prien, Stemmer, Balke and Bock.)	21 July 1944	20:52	Yak-9	over the Baltic Sea, near Kunda
54	18 June 1944	08:28	La-5	PQ 26 Ost 91369; 30 km (19 mi) southeast of Vyborg	73	22 July 1944	17:52	Yak-9	PQ 25 Ost 88597; 10 km (6.2 mi) south of Ostrov
55	19 June 1944	18:45	Yak-9	PQ 26 Ost 91533; 30 km (19 mi) north of Zelenogorsk	74	23 July 1944	08:28	La-5	PQ 25 Ost 88157 vicinity of Pskov
?	20 June 1944	15:40	P-39	30 km (19 mi) northwest of Zelenogorsk	75	23 July 1944	15:19	Pe-2	PQ 25 Ost 78265
56	21 June 1944	09:20	La-5	PQ 26 Ost 81575 over the Baltic Sea, northeast of Hungerburg	76	23 July 1944	15:21	Pe-2	PQ 25 Ost 88323; 10 km (6.2 mi) south of Pskov
57	23 June 1944	12:28	Yak-9	PQ 26 Ost 81426; 10 km (6.2 mi) east of Vyborg	77	24 July 1944	16:03	Il-2	PQ 26 Ost 70693; 15 km (9.3 mi) southwest of Narva
58	26 June 1944	13:42	La-5	3 km (1.9 mi) south of Vyborg	78	26 July 1944	16:36	Il-2	PQ 26 Ost 70695; 15 km (9.3 mi) southwest of Narva
59	26 June 1944	13:47	La-5	5 km (3.1 mi) south of Häämeda	79	26 July 1944	17:02	Pe-2	PQ 26 Ost 70695 over the Gulf of Finland
60	26 June 1944	18:45	Yak-9	4 km (2.5 mi) east of Vyborg	80	26 July 1944	17:03	Pe-2	PQ 26 Ost 70695 over the Gulf of Finland
61	28 June 1944	09:25	Yak-9	PQ 26 Ost 91315; 20 km (12 mi) east of Vyborg	81	26 July 1944	17:05	Pe-2	PQ 26 Ost 70695; 40 km (25 mi) southwest of Narva
62	28 June 1944	20:45	La-5	PQ 26 Ost 81347; 10 km (6.2 mi) east of Vyborg	82	27 July 1944	11:23	La-5	PQ 25 Ost 78648; 45 km (28 mi) west of Ostrov
63	29 June 1944	08:05	DB-3	PQ 26 Ost 91265; 65 km (40 mi) east-northeast of Vyborg	83	27 July 1944	14:30	Yak-9	PQ 25 Ost 78562, northwest of Liepna; 40 km (25 mi) northeast of Schwanenburg
64	30 June 1944	09:43	Boston	PQ 26 Ost 81413; 10 km (6.2 mi) southeast of Vyborg	84	27 July 1944	18:45	Yak-9	PQ 25 Ost 78523; 40 km (25 mi) northeast of Schwanenburg
65	30 June 1944	20:44	Yak-9	PQ 26 Ost 81297, north-northwest of Talias; 20 km (12 mi) northwest of Vyborg	85	27 July 1944	19:02	Il-2	PQ 25 Ost 78481; 40 km (25 mi) southwest of Selo
66	2 July 1944	06:51	P-39	PQ 26 Ost 91175; 40 km (25 mi) northeast of Vyborg	86	2 August 1944	13:05	La-5	PQ 26 Ost 70462 over the Baltic Sea, north-northwest of Hungerburg
67	4 July 1944	08:25	P-39	PQ 26 Ost 81467	87	2 August 1944	13:09	La-5	PQ 26 Ost 70481 over the Baltic Sea, northwest of Hungerburg
68	6 July 1944	15:40	Yak-9	PQ 26 Ost 81422 vicinity of Vyborg	88	3 August 1944	15:24	Il-2	PQ 26 Ost 80572 southwest of Narva
69	8 July 1944	06:30	Yak-9	PQ 26 Ost 81431; 10 km (6.2 mi) east of Vyborg	89	3 August 1944	15:31	La-5	PQ 26 Ost 80582 southeast of Narva
70	9 July 1944	12:12	Yak-9	PQ 26 Ost 91418; 45 km (28 mi) east of Vyborg	90	20 August 1944	13:59	Yak-9	PQ 25 Ost 57252; 50 km (31 mi) north-northwest of Kreuzburg
71	9 July 1944	21:03	Yak-9	PQ 26 Ost 91199; 40 km (25 mi) northeast of Vyborg	91	20 August 1944	16:09	Yak-9	PQ 25 Ost 57429; 20 km (12 mi) northwest of Kreuzburg
72	14 July 1944	10:32	Yak-9	PQ 26 Ost 91415; 45 km (28 mi) east of Vyborg					
– 1. Staffel of Jagdgeschwader 54 –
92	26 August 1944	15:21	P-39	PQ KF-5/6	106	17 September 1944	16:26	Yak-9	PQ 25 Ost 37382; 25 km (16 mi) southwest of Mitau
93	26 August 1944	15:23? (Note: According to Mathews and Foreman claimed at 15:22.)	Pe-2	PQ KG-7/5	107	19 September 1944	15:57	La-5	PQ 25 Ost 37353; 25 km (16 mi) west-southwest of Mitau
94	26 August 1944	15:24	Pe-2	PQ KG-8/3	108	19 September 1944	15:59	Il-2	PQ 25 Ost 37381; 25 km (16 mi) southwest of Mitau
95	3 September 1944	10:18	Pe-2	PQ 25 Ost 58893; 45 km (28 mi) southeast of Wenden	109	20 September 1944	14:09	Yak-9	PQ 25 Ost 47382; 45 km (28 mi) south-southwest of Riga
96	6 September 1944	07:35	Yak-9	PQ 25 Ost 37366; 15 km (9.3 mi) west-southwest of Mitau	110	20 September 1944	14:10	Yak-9	PQ 25 Ost 47386; 45 km (28 mi) south-southwest of Riga
97	6 September 1944	07:45	Yak-9	PQ 25 Ost 37626; 20 km (12 mi) south of Mitau	111	27 September 1944	15:30	Yak-9	PQ 25 Ost 57146; 25 km (16 mi) south-southeast of Mālpils
98	14 September 1944	14:52	Il-2	PQ 25 Ost 57215; 45 km (28 mi) east-southeast of Mālpils	112	28 September 1944	13:57? (Note: According to Mathews and Foreman claimed at 13:54.)	Yak-9	PQ 25 Ost 48823; 20 km (12 mi) north-northwest of Mālpils
99	14 September 1944	14:53	Il-2	PQ 25 Ost 57219; 45 km (28 mi) east-southeast of Mālpils	113	1 October 1944	16:09	Yak-9	PQ 25 Ost 48725 over the Baltic Sea, north-northeast of Riga
100	14 September 1944	16:50	P-39	PQ 25 Ost 47139; 20 km (12 mi) east of Riga	114	7 October 1944	15:56	Il-2	PQ 25 Ost 48882 west of Mālpils
101	15 September 1944	13:35	Pe-2	PQ 25 Ost 47343; 15 km (9.3 mi) northeast of Mitau	115	7 October 1944	15:57	Il-2	PQ 25 Ost 58757; 20 km (12 mi) northeast of Valmiera
102	15 September 1944	18:20	La-5	PQ 25 Ost 47378; 45 km (28 mi) south of Riga	116	9 October 1944	08:56? (Note: According to Mathews and Foreman claimed at 09:56.)	Yak-9	PQ 25 Ost 47191; 25 km (16 mi) southeast of Riga
103	16 September 1944	09:18	La-5	PQ 25 Ost 37496; 20 km (12 mi) southeast of Mitau	117	12 October 1944	10:55? (Note: According to Mathews and Foreman claimed at 10:45.)	Pe-2	PQ 25 Ost 48782; 10 km (6.2 mi) northeast of Riga
104	16 September 1944	12:44	La-5	PQ 25 Ost 47517; 45 km (28 mi) northeast of Pasewalk	?	27 December 1944	—	Yak-9	Dobele
105	26 June 1944	16:24	P-39	PQ 25 Ost 37354; 25 km (16 mi) west-southwest of Mitau					

=== Awards ===
- Iron Cross (1939) 2nd and 1st Class
- German Cross in Gold on 20 March 1944 as Fahnenjunker-Feldwebel in the II./Jagdgeschwader 54
- Honour Goblet of the Luftwaffe (Ehrenpokal der Luftwaffe) on 24 April 1944 as Fahnenjunker-Oberfeldwebel and pilot
- Knight's Cross of the Iron Cross on 30 September 1944 as Leutnant and pilot in the 1./Jagdgeschwader 54 (Note: According to Scherzer as pilot in the II./Jagdgeschwader 54.)
