= Fritz Wentzell =

WW2 German army general (1899-1948)

- Born: 29 April 1899; Kassel, German Empire
- Died: 1 April 1948 (aged 48); Bad Nauheim, Allied-occupied Germany
- Military career
- Allegiance: German Empire; Weimar Republic; Nazi Germany
- Branch: Army
- Service years: 1917–1920; 1924–1945
- Rank: Generalleutnant
- Units: 10th Army; Army Group G Army Group C
- Conflicts: World War II
- Awards: Knight's Cross of the Iron Cross

Fritz Wentzell (29 April 1899 – 1 April 1948) was a German general (Generalleutnant) in the Wehrmacht during World War II. He was a recipient of the Knight's Cross of the Iron Cross of Nazi Germany.

== Awards and decorations ==
- Knight's Cross of the Iron Cross on 23 October 1944 as Generalmajor and chief of the general staff of the 10. Armee

Military offices
Preceded by None	Chief of Staff of the 10. Armee; August 1943 – 30 November 1944	Succeeded by Generalmajor Dietrich Beelitz
Preceded by Generalmajor Helmut Staedke	Chief of Staff of Heeresgruppe G 30 March 1945 – April 1945	Succeeded by None
Preceded by General der Panzertruppe Hans Röttiger	Chief of Staff of Heeresgruppe C 29 April 1945 – 2 May 1945	Succeeded by General der Panzertruppe Hans Röttiger
