= Joachim Wünning =

- Born: 1 April 1898
- Died: 22 September 1944 (aged 46) off Vathi, Samos, German-occupied Greece
- Occupations: Politician; naval commander
- Years active: 1932–1944
- Known for: Member of the Reichstag
- Awards: Knight's Cross of the Iron Cross

Joachim Wünning (1 April 1898 – 22 September 1944) was a German politician and naval commander during the Nazi era.

In the 1932 German federal election, Wünning was elected to the Reichstag as a member of the NSDAP and represented electoral constituency 11 (Merseburg) until his death in 1944.

During World War II, Wünning served in the German navy reaching the rank of Korvettenkapitän. From 20 August 1942 until his death, Wünning commanded the minelayer Drache (renamed Schiff 50 6 November 42), which served as a troop transport, escort vessel and submarine chaser in addition to her minelaying duties. He was a recipient of the German Cross in Gold on 7 July 1944. Wünning was killed on 22 September 1944 near Vathi, Greece, by Allied aircraft. He was posthumously awarded the Knight's Cross of the Iron Cross on 22 October 1944.

== Bibliography ==
- Fellgiebel, Walther-Peer (2000). Die Träger des Ritterkreuzes des Eisernen Kreuzes 1939–1945 — Die Inhaber der höchsten Auszeichnung des Zweiten Weltkrieges aller Wehrmachtteile [The Bearers of the Knight's Cross of the Iron Cross 1939–1945 — The Owners of the Highest Award of the Second World War of all Wehrmacht Branches] (in German). Friedberg, Germany: Podzun-Pallas. ISBN 978-3-7909-0284-6.
- Patzwall, Klaus D.; Scherzer, Veit (2001). Das Deutsche Kreuz 1941 – 1945 Geschichte und Inhaber Band II [The German Cross 1941 – 1945 History and Recipients Volume 2] (in German). Norderstedt, Germany: Verlag Klaus D. Patzwall. ISBN 978-3-931533-45-8.
