= Gustav Wagner (Wehrmacht) =

German Nazi general

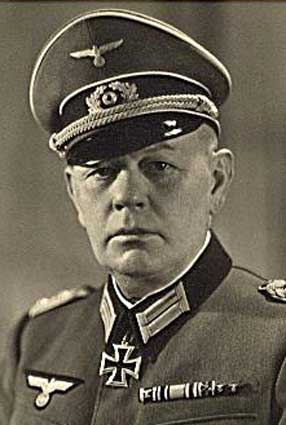
- Born: Gustav Adolf Heinrich Wagner; 23 September 1890; Bischofsburg, East Prussia, Germany
- Died: 14 May 1951 (aged 60); Goslar, Lower Saxony, West Germany
- Military career
- Allegiance: Nazi Germany
- Branch: Army (Wehrmacht)
- Rank: Generalmajor
- Conflicts: World War II
- Awards: Knight's Cross of the Iron Cross

Gustav Adolf Heinrich Wagner (23 September 1890 – 14 May 1951) was a general in the Wehrmacht of Nazi Germany during World War II. He was a recipient of the Knight's Cross of the Iron Cross.

== Awards and decorations ==
- Knight's Cross of the Iron Cross on 14 December 1941 as Oberst and commander of Infanterie-Regiment 44
