= Hausham =

- Municipality
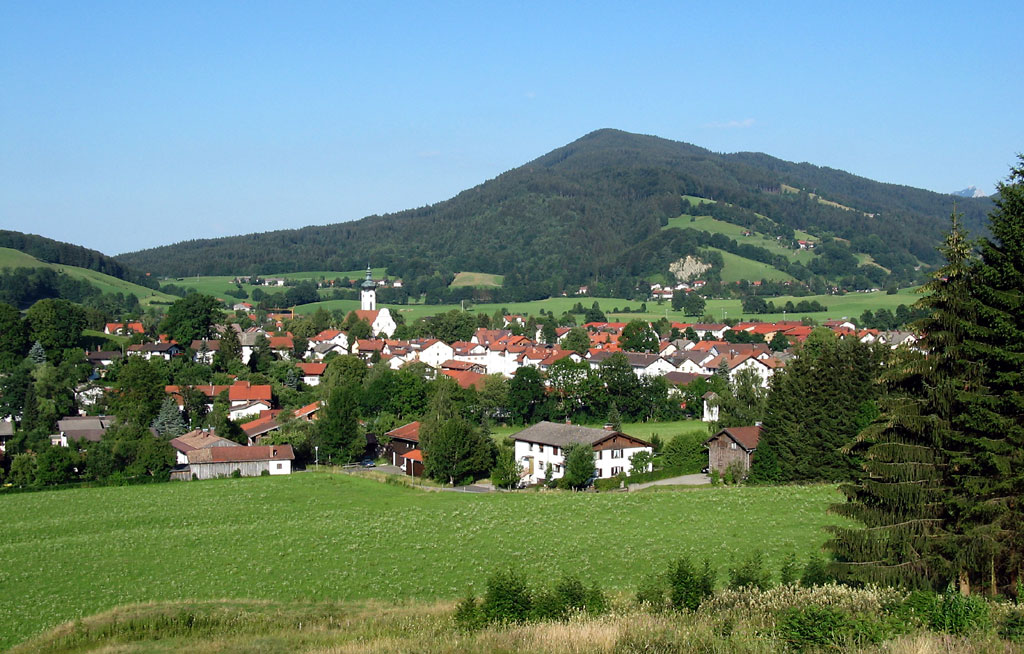
- Hausham

- Coat of arms

- Location of Hausham within Miesbach district
- Interactive map of Hausham
- Location within Germany Location within Bavaria
- Coordinates: 47°45′N 11°51′E
- Country: Germany
- State: Bavaria
- Admin. region: Upper Bavaria
- District: Miesbach
- Subdivisions: 13 districts

Government
  - Mayor (2020–26): Jens Zangenfeind (FW)

Area
  - Total: 22.28 km^{2} (8.60 sq mi)
- Elevation: 765 m (2,510 ft)

Population (2025-12-31)
  - Total: 8,152
  - Density: 365.9/km^{2} (947.6/sq mi)
- Time zone: UTC+01:00 (CET)
  - Summer (DST): UTC+02:00 (CEST)
- Postal codes: 83734
- Dialling codes: 08026
- Vehicle registration: MB
- Website: www.hausham.de

Hausham is a municipality in the district of Miesbach in Bavaria in south-eastern Germany.

== Geography ==
Hausham is located approximately 45 km south of Munich, between Miesbach and Schliersee. It is surrounded to the south by mountains, including Huberspitz (1.052 m) and Neureuth (1.261 m).

== Districts ==
Hausham's 13 districts are:

- Abwinkl
- Agatharied
- Aigner
- Althausham
- Haushamer Alm
- Holz
- Kasten
- Moosrain
- Rain
- Thal
- Tiefenbach
- Tratberg
- Nagelbach

== Twin towns ==
- Since 1959 Levico Terme in Italy
- Since 1990 Seiersberg in Austria

== History ==
Hausham was created from the town of Agatharied on 27 April 1922. This was due to Hausham's growth through coal mining.

The first brown coal mine was opened in 1860 but couldn't compete with the cheaper fossil oil and mineral coal and closed 106 years later in 1966.

During World War II, Hausham was the location of two subcamps of the Dachau concentration camp, one for men and one for women. On 29 April 1945, Hausham was captured by American troops.

== Transport ==
=== Public transport ===
Hausham is located on a direct railway line to Munich and has two stations: (Hausham and Agatharied). The line is operated by the private railway Bayerische Oberlandbahn. In addition to rail links, the Hausham area is served by the RVO local bus service.

== Famous people in Hausham ==
- Benjamin Lauth, footballer for 1860 München
- Marcus H. Rosenmüller, film director
- Josef Stallhofer, artist painter
- Josef Wurmheller, German fighter ace during WW2
