= Wachowiak =

Wachowiak (Polish pronunciation: [vaˈxɔvjak]) is a surname of Polish-language origin. It may refer to:

- Friedrich Wachowiak (1920–1944), German Luftwaffe fighter ace
- Jutta Wachowiak (born 1940), German actress
