= Reinhold Maier (Austrian politician) =

Austrian politician (born 1977)

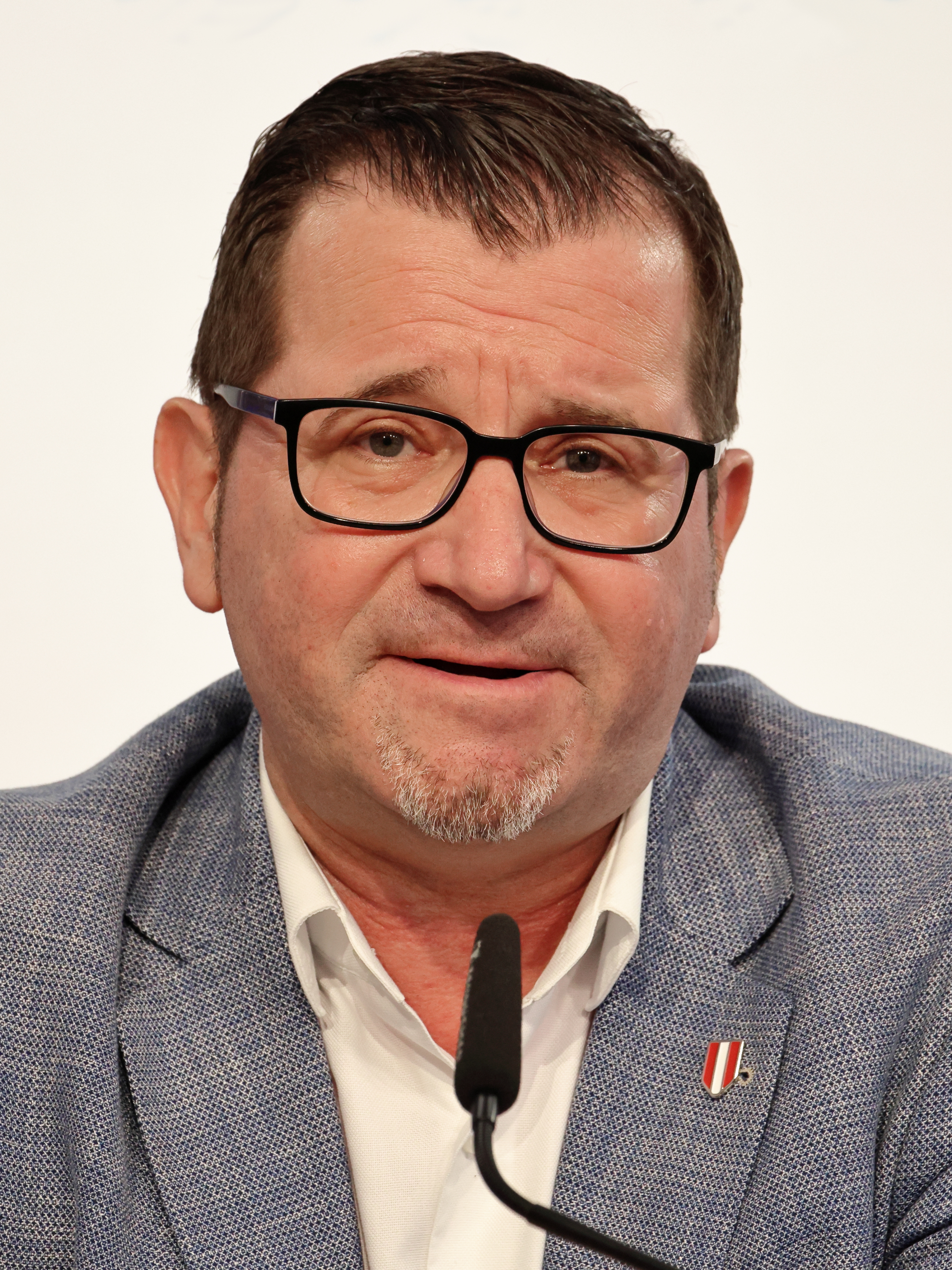

Member of the National Council
- Incumbent
- Assumed office 24 October 2024
- Constituency: Greater Graz

Personal details
- Born: 24 December 1977 (age 48)
- Party: Freedom Party

Reinhold Maier (born 24 December 1977) is an Austrian politician of the Freedom Party serving as a member of the National Council since 2024. He is a city councillor of Seiersberg-Pirka.
