= August Mors =

German fighter ace and Knight's Cross recipient

- Born: 20 June 1921; Sigmaringen
- Died: 8 August 1944 (aged 23); Clichy
- Cause of death: Died of wounds
- Burial place: Champigny-Saint-André German war cemetery plot 3—row 9—grave 756
- Military career
- Allegiance: Nazi Germany
- Branch: Luftwaffe
- Rank: Leutnant (second lieutenant)
- Unit: JG 5
- Conflicts: World War II: Eastern Front; Defence of the Reich
- Awards: Knight's Cross of the Iron Cross

August Mors (20 June 1921 – 8 August 1944) was a Luftwaffe ace and recipient of the Knight's Cross of the Iron Cross during World War II. The Knight's Cross of the Iron Cross, and its variants were the highest awards in the military and paramilitary forces of Nazi Germany during World War II. On 6 August 1944, August Mors was severely wounded after attacking allied bombers. He bailed out, but died two days later on 8 August 1944. He was posthumously awarded the Knight's Cross on 20 October 1944. During his career he was credited with 60 aerial victories, 48 on the Eastern Front and 12 on the Western Front.

== Career ==
Mors was born on 20 June 1921 in Sigmaringen, at the time in the Province of Hohenzollern within the Weimar Republic. Following completion of flight and fighter pilot training, (Note: Flight training in the Luftwaffe progressed through the levels A1, A2 and B1, B2, referred to as A/B flight training. A training included theoretical and practical training in aerobatics, navigation, long-distance flights and dead-stick landings. The B courses included high-altitude flights, instrument flights, night landings and training to handle the aircraft in difficult situations.) Mors was posted to the 6. Staffel (6th squadron) of Jagdgeschwader 5 (JG 5—5th Fighter Wing) in May 1942. At the time, 6. Staffel was commanded by Oberleutnant Horst Carganico and subordinated to II. Gruppe (2nd group) of JG 5 headed by Major Hennig Strümpell. The Staffel was based at an airfield at Petsamo, present-day Pechenga in Murmansk Oblast, Soviet Union on the Eismeerfront (Ice Sea Front)—the area of operations nearest the Arctic Ocean. On 1 June, Strümpell was transferred and command of II. Gruppe was given to Carganico. In consequence, 6. Staffel command was passed on to Oberleutnant Hans-Diether Hartwein. During this period, II. Gruppe received the Messerschmitt Bf 109 F-4. Training on this aircraft was done in small groups at Pori Airfield in Finland.

=== War on the Arctic Front ===
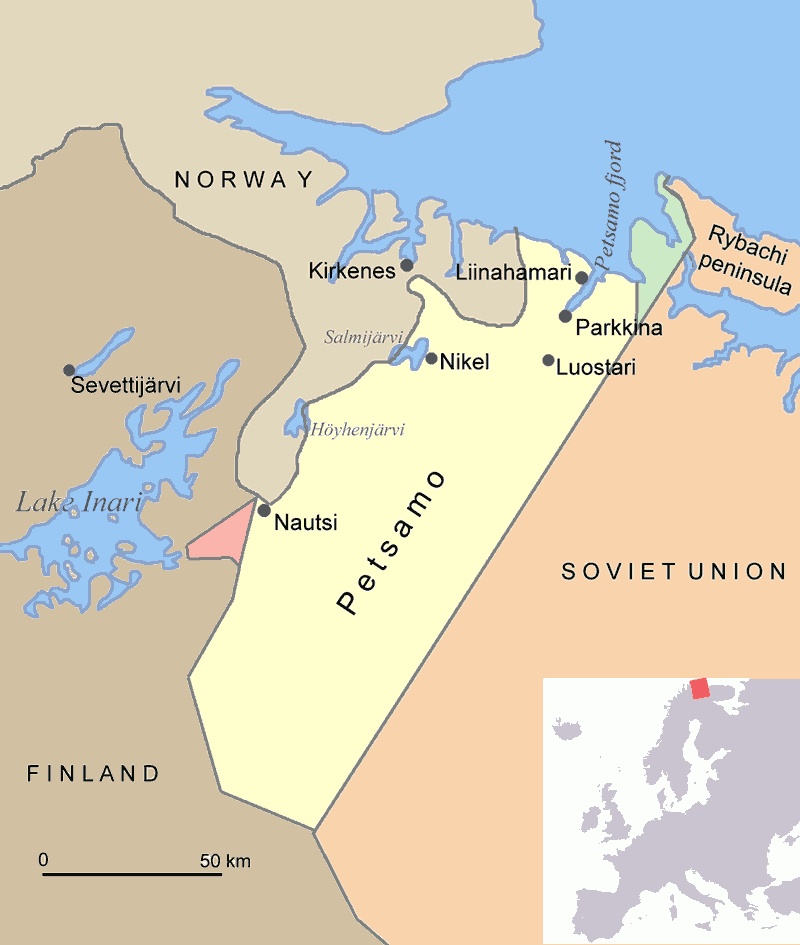
Area of operations.

On 27 September 1942, Mors claimed his first aerial victory. At 14:55, elements of II. Gruppe escorted Messerschmitt Bf 110 heavy fighters to Vayenga. On this mission, Mors was the wingman of Theodor Weissenberger and shot down a Hawker Hurricane fighter. On 6 January 1943, the Gruppe received the first Bf 109 G-2 variant. Mors was one of the pilots who shuttled one of the aircraft from Krasnogvardeysk, present-day Gatchina, to Alakurtti Air Field. Three days later, on a mission to Kandalaksha, Mors claimed a Hurricane and a Lavochkin-Gorbunov-Gudkov LaGG-3 fighter. For this he was awarded the Iron Cross 2nd Class (Eisernes Kreuz zweiter Klasse). On 8 June, Mors claimed three "Typhoon" fighters shot down. According to Mombeek, the Hawker Typhoon fighter was never deployed on the Arctic theater. The author assumed that the "Typhoon" refers to the LaGG-3 fighter. For these claims, Mors received the Iron Cross 1st Class (Eisernes Kreuz erster Klasse).

Following aerial combat 15–20 kilometers (9.3–12.4 miles) northwest of Murmashi on 15 June 1943, Mors was forced to bail out of his Bf 109 G-2 (Werknummer 13 764—factory number), sustaining minor injuries. At first, he was reported as missing in action as all search attempts failed. Three days later, Mors was spotted and rescued by an Arado Ar 196 aircraft and returned to his unit. Following his return, Mors was given a few days of convalescence. On 6 August, 6. Staffel moved to an airfield named Pontsalenjoki, located west of Pyaozersky. That evening, Mors claimed two Curtiss P-40 Warhawk fighters shot down.

In November 1943, II. Gruppe was ordered to relocate further south to the front near Nevel, Leningrad and Lake Ilmen. Relocating from Pskov, 6. Staffel arrived at their new airfield at Idritsa on 11 November 1943 and was in action again on 17 November. In March 1944, II. Gruppe was transferred to the far north again, arriving at Alakurtti Air Field on 15 March. Here on 20 March, Mors became an "ace-in-a-day" when he claimed eight aerial victories, six Ilyushin Il-2 ground-attack aircraft and two P-40 fighters. On 13 April, Mors claimed three Yakovlev Yak-9 fighters shot down on a Junkers Ju 87 dive bomber escort mission. The following day, he received the German Cross in Gold (Deutsches Kreuz in Gold) for 48 aerial victories claimed.

=== Invasion of Normandy and death ===
When in early June 1944, Hauptmann Weissenberger was appointed commander of I. Gruppe of JG 5, Weissenberger had four experienced pilots from II. Gruppe transferred as well, one of which was Mors. On 6 June, the Allied invasion of Normandy began. To counter the invasion, elements of I. Gruppe of JG 5 were transported to France by train that afternoon. The ground personnel were flown on Junkers Ju 52s to their airfield at Montdidier, 35 km (22 mi) south of Amiens. On 2 July, I. Gruppe relocated to a makeshift airfield at Frières-Faillouël. Here on 7 July, I. Gruppe took off at 18:15 and engaged a formation of approximately 20 United States Army Air Forces (USAAF) Republic P-47 Thunderbolt fighters. During the course of this encounter, Mors was credited with the destruction of a P-47 fighter, probably belonging to the 362d Fighter Group.

Due to the advancing American and British forces, I. Gruppe had to abandon the airfield at Frières-Faillouël and relocated to an airfield at Arpajon-Brétigny-sur-Orge on 5 August. The following day, Mors and Leutnant Alfred Lehner took off on a fighter escort mission. While airborne, the orders were changed and the two pilots were ordered to intercept a heavy bomber formation north of Paris. At 12:20, Mors reported the destruction of a heavy bomber near Beaumont-sur-Oise, his 60th and last aerial victory. However, both Mors' and Lehner's aircraft were hit by defensive gunfire. Lehner managed to make crash landing, sustaining burn injuries to his face, a broken nose and a concussion. Mors however managed to bail out of his Bf 109 G-6 (Werknummer 165 881). Just as he had left the aircraft, he was hit by a bullet in the lung. He came down in a forest near Ully-Saint-Georges where he was recovered a few hours later still entangled in a tree. Both Mors and Lehner were taken to a hospital in Clichy. There, Mors succumbed to his injuries in the night 8/9 August. On 11 August, he was buried at the Ivry Cemetery, later reinterred at the Champigny-Saint-André German war cemetery (plot 3—row 9—grave 756). Posthumously, Mors was awarded the Knight's Cross of the Iron Cross (Ritterkreuz des Eisernen Kreuzes) on 24 October 1944.

== Summary of career ==
=== Aerial victory claims ===
According to US historian David T. Zabecki, Mors was credited with 60 aerial victories. Spick also lists him with 60 aerial victories, 48 of which on the Eastern Front and 12 over the Western Allies, including one four-engine heavy bomber, claimed in an unknown number of combat missions. Mathews and Foreman, authors of Luftwaffe Aces — Biographies and Victory Claims, researched the German Federal Archives and found records for 58 aerial victory claims, plus three further unconfirmed claims. This figure includes 48 aerial victories on the Eastern Front and another 10 on the Western Front.

Victory claims were logged to a map-reference (PQ = Planquadrat), for example "PQ 37 Ost UH". The Luftwaffe grid map (Jägermeldenetz) covered all of Europe, western Russia and North Africa and was composed of rectangles measuring 15 minutes of latitude by 30 minutes of longitude, an area of about 360 square miles (930 km^{2}). These sectors were then subdivided into 36 smaller units to give a location area 3 km × 4 km (1.9 mi × 2.5 mi) in size.

Chronicle of aerial victories
This and the ♠ (Ace of spades) indicates those aerial victories which made Mors an "ace-in-a-day", a term which designates a fighter pilot who has shot down five or more airplanes in a single day. This and the – (dash) indicates unconfirmed aerial victory claims for which Mors did not receive credit. This and the ? (exclamation mark) indicates information discrepancies listed by Prien, Stemmer, Rodeike, Bock, Mombeek, Mathews, and Foreman.
Claim	Date	Time	Type	Location	Claim	Date	Time	Type	Location
– 6. Staffel of Jagdgeschwader 5 – Eastern Front and northern Norway, and Finland — May – 31 December 1942
1	27 September 1942	~15:00	Hurricane						
– 6. Staffel of Jagdgeschwader 5 – Eastern Front and northern Norway, and Finland — 1 January – 31 December 1943
2	8 January 1943? (Note: According to Mombeek claimed on 9 January 1943.)	~10:00	Hurricane	Kandalaksha	9	15 June 1943	~23:00	P-39	
3	8 January 1943?	~10:00	LaGG-3	Kandalaksha	10	9 August 1943	20:19	I-153? (Note: According to Mombeek claimed as a Curtiss P-40 Warhawk.)	east of Loukhi-3 (air base)
—	25 January 1943	—	Hurricane		11	9 August 1943	20:24	I-153?	south of Loukhi-3 (air base)
4	13 April 1943	17:00+	P-39	vicinity of Murmashi	12	23 September 1943	12:57	P-39	PQ 37 Ost UH
5	29 April 1943	~11:00	P-39		13	23 September 1943	13:08	P-39	PQ 37 Ost UH
6	8 June 1943	—	Typhoon?		14	24 September 1943	08:51	Hurricane	PQ 36 Ost AG
7	8 June 1943	—	Typhoon?		15	24 September 1943	09:08	Hurricane	PQ 36 Ost AG
8	8 June 1943	—	Typhoon?						
– 6. Staffel of Jagdgeschwader 5 – Eastern Front — 1 January – 21 May 1944
16	14 January 1944	11:50	Il-2	PQ 35 Ost 16797	33♠	20 March 1944	09:58	P-40	south of Lake Kamenonje (Note: Lake Kamenonje or Kamennoye is located at 67°03′03.6″N 31°07′42.6″E)
17	19 January 1944	13:50	Il-2	PQ 35 Ost 07534	34♠	20 March 1944	15:02	Il-2	PQ 36 Ost JD-4/5
18	25 January 1944	14:15	Yak-9	PQ 35 Ost 19377	35♠	20 March 1944	15:03	Il-2	PQ 36 Ost JD-4/5
19	1 February 1944	10:54	La-5	PQ 35 Ost 09719	36♠	20 March 1944	15:04	Il-2	PQ 36 Ost JD-4/1
20	14 February 1944	11:47	Il-2	PQ 26 Ost 70688, west-southwest of Narva	37♠	20 March 1944	15:05	Il-2	PQ 36 Ost JE-5/4
21	14 February 1944	11:50	Il-2	PQ 26 Ost 70833, southwest of Narva	38	25 March 1944	09:22	Yak-9	PQ 36 Ost JB-3/3
22	27 February 1944	11:34	Il-2	PQ 25 Ost 87665	39	25 March 1944	09:24	Yak-9	PQ 36 Ost JC-1/6
23	27 February 1944	15:27	Il-2	PQ 25 Ost 97722	40	25 March 1944	09:28	Yak-9	PQ 36 Ost JB-6/6
24	27 February 1944	15:30	LaGG-3	PQ 25 Ost 97811 vicinity of Pustoschka	41	4 April 1944	18:21	Yak-9	northeast of Nischnij-Wermann (Note: Lake Nischnij-Wermann or Nizhniy-Verman is located at 66°58′30.4″N 30°50′49.1″E)
25	16 March 1944	12:04	Yak-9	PQ 36 Ost JD-4/3	42	4 April 1944	18:23? (Note: According to Mombeek, as well as by Mathews and Foreman, claimed at 18:27.)	Yak-9	northeast of Nischnij-Wermann
26	17 March 1944	10:33	Yak-9	PQ 36 Ost JD-2/6	43	9 April 1944	10:10	Yak-9	PQ 37 Ost JC-9/5
27	17 March 1944	13:05	Yak-9	Lake Tolwand	44	12 April 1944	09:03	Yak-9	PQ 36 Ost JC-9/9
28	18 March 1944	14:34	Yak-9	northwest of Njamosero railway station	45	12 April 1944	09:04	Yak-9	PQ 36 Ost JB-4/9
29	18 March 1944	14:36	Yak-9	northwest of Njamosero railway station	46	13 April 1944	19:56	Yak-9	PQ 36 Ost JD-8/4
30♠	20 March 1944	09:52	Il-2	northwest of northwest of Nischnij-Wermann	47	13 April 1944	19:57	Yak-9	PQ 36 Ost JC-7/3
31♠	20 March 1944	09:52	Il-2	northwest of northwest of Nischnij-Wermann	48	13 April 1944	19:58	Yak-9	PQ 36 Ost JC-7/5
32♠	20 March 1944	09:57	Il-2? (Note: According to Mathews and Foreman claimed as a Curtiss P-40 Warhawk.)	east of northwest of Nischnij-Wermann					
– I. Gruppe of Jagdgeschwader 5 – Invasion of France — 6 June – 8 August 1944
49	7 July 1944	18:33	P-47	PQ 05 Ost S/RF-5/3; Rosières-en-Santerre	55	19 July 1944	20:23	Typhoon	PQ 15 West S/UU-4/5; Caen
50	13 July 1944	18:27	Typhoon	PQ 05 Ost S/TA-5/4; Triqueville	56	19 July 1944	20:25	Typhoon	PQ 15 West S/UU-4/5; Caen
51	14 July 1944	14:57	P-47	PQ 05 Ost S/UB-5/9; Rivière-Thibouville	57	19 July 1944	20:28	Typhoon	PQ 05 Ost S/UA-3/5; Lisieux
52	18 July 1944	09:31	P-38	PQ 04 Ost N/AB-6; Le Neubourg	58	25 July 1944	11:00	Spitfire	PQ 05 Ost S/TC-9/8; Les Andelys
53	18 July 1944	09:32	P-38	PQ 04 Ost N/AB-6; Le Neubourg	— ? (Note: This unconfirmed claim is listed as his 59th aerial victory by Mombeek.)	4 August 1944	18:17	P-47	Nogent-le-Rotrou
54	18 July 1944	09:37	P-38	PQ 05 Ost S/TC-5/6; Fleury-sur-Andelle	— ? (Note: This unconfirmed claim is not listed by Prien, Stemmer, and Bock. Mombeek lists this claim as his 60th aerial victory.)	6 August 1944	12:20	B-17 or B-24	Beaumont-sur-Oise

=== Awards ===
- Iron Cross (1939) 2nd and 1st Class
- German Cross in Gold on 14 April 1944 as Feldwebel in the 6./Jagdgeschwader 5
- Honor Goblet of the Luftwaffe on 15 May 1944 as Feldwebel and pilot (Note: According to Obermaier on 10 April 1944.)
- Knight's Cross of the Iron Cross on 20 October 1944 as Leutnant and pilot in the 1./Jagdgeschwader 5 (Note: According to Scherzer on 24 October 1944.)
