= Champigny-Saint-André German war cemetery =

German World War II cemetery in France

- German War Graves Commission (Volksbund Deutsche Kriegsgräberfürsorge)
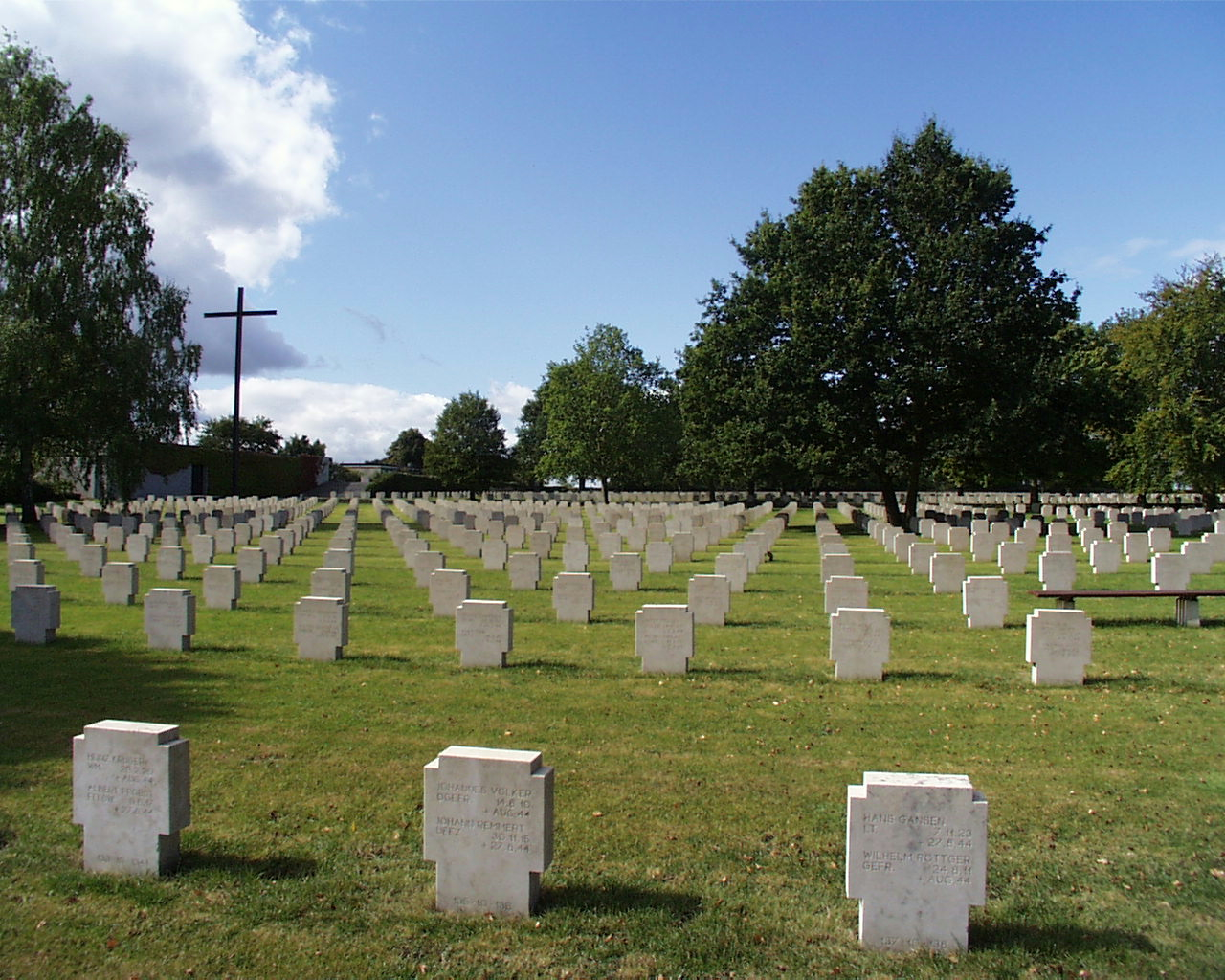
- German war cemetery at Champigny-Saint-André
- Used for those deceased
- Established: 1944
- Location: 48°52′30.9″N 1°16′29.6″E near Saint-André-de-l'Eure, Normandy, France
- Total burials: 19,831

Burials by nation
- Germany

Burials by war
- World War II

Champigny-Saint-André is a German World War II cemetery in Normandy, France. It is located 5 kilometers South of the village of Saint-André-de-l'Eure, about 25 km (16 mi) south east of Évreux. The burials are from the summer of 1944, as the Allies pushed out of Normandy towards Paris. It is the second largest of the six German war cemeteries in Normandy with nearly 20,000 burials. The cemetery is maintained and managed by the voluntary German War Graves Commission (Volksbund Deutsche Kriegsgräberfürsorge).

== History ==
Champigny-Saint-André was originally the site of a battlefield cemetery, established by the United States Army Graves Registration Service in August 1944 during the push towards Paris across the Seine. Fallen American and German soldiers and airmen were buried in two adjacent grave sites.

Following the end of the war in Europe in May 1945, the American Battle Monuments Commission began exhuming the remains of American servicemen and transferring them in accordance with the wishes of their families. Beginning in 1945, the Americans transferred two-thirds of their fallen from this site back to the United States while the remainder were re-interred at the new permanent American Cemetery and Memorial at Colleville-sur-Mer, which overlooks the Omaha Beach landing site.

The French authorities (Service français des sépultures militaires) collected additional German casualties from a wide area who were in field graves and small local cemeteries. This includes all German burials that had been interred in the civilian cemeteries in Paris during the German occupation.

With agreement between the French and German authorities after the war, fallen German soldiers buried in the departments Eure, Orne, Seine-Maritime, Eure-et-Loire and Seine-et-Oise were moved to Champigny-Saint-André.

== Layout ==
Behind the main entrance is a memorial courtyard that includes columns of travertine detailing the locations from where German casualties were brought to the cemetery. Headstones are made from light-coloured limestone and bear the name, rank and date of birth and death of two servicemen resting next to one another. There are 17 burial areas of varying size containing a total of 19,836 fallen German servicemen. A central path leads to a 16 m (52 ft) high steel cross. There is a mass grave (Kameradengrab) containing 816 bodies of which 303 are identified and recorded on stone markers.

The Champigny-Saint-André war cemetery was inaugurated on 12 September 1964.

== Personal fates ==
The majority of the Germans killed during the Allied push towards Paris in August 1944 were buried at Champigny-Saint-André. People buried at the cemetery include:

- Generaloberst Friedrich Dollman, high ranking German officer, died 28 June 1944.
- Generalmajor der Flieger Otto Abernetty, who died in a plane crash on 2 July 1940.
- General der Infanterie Otto von Stülpnagel, German military commander in France, who committed suicide in his cell on 6 February 1948, in Paris, while awaiting trial.
- Hauptmann Josef Wurmheller, a fighter pilot ace with 102 kills, killed on 22 June 1944 in collision with his wingman over Alençon.
- SS Obersturmführer Hans Hermann Junge, killed by American air strike on 13 August 1944; married in 1943 to Traudl Junge, one of Hitler's secretaries.
- SS Brigadeführer Fritz Witt, killed 14 June 1944 during a naval artillery bombardment near Caen.
- Oberfeldwebel Karl Daniel (b.1915), Rommel's driver from Afrika Korps days, died of wounds on 18 July 1944, Block 10, grave 665.
- Hauptmann Friedrich Wachowiak, a fighter pilot ace, killed on 16 July 1944.
- Leutnant August Mors, a fighter pilot ace, died on 8 August 1944 of wounds sustained two days earlier.

== See also ==
- List of military cemeteries in Normandy
