= Pirka =

- Former municipality
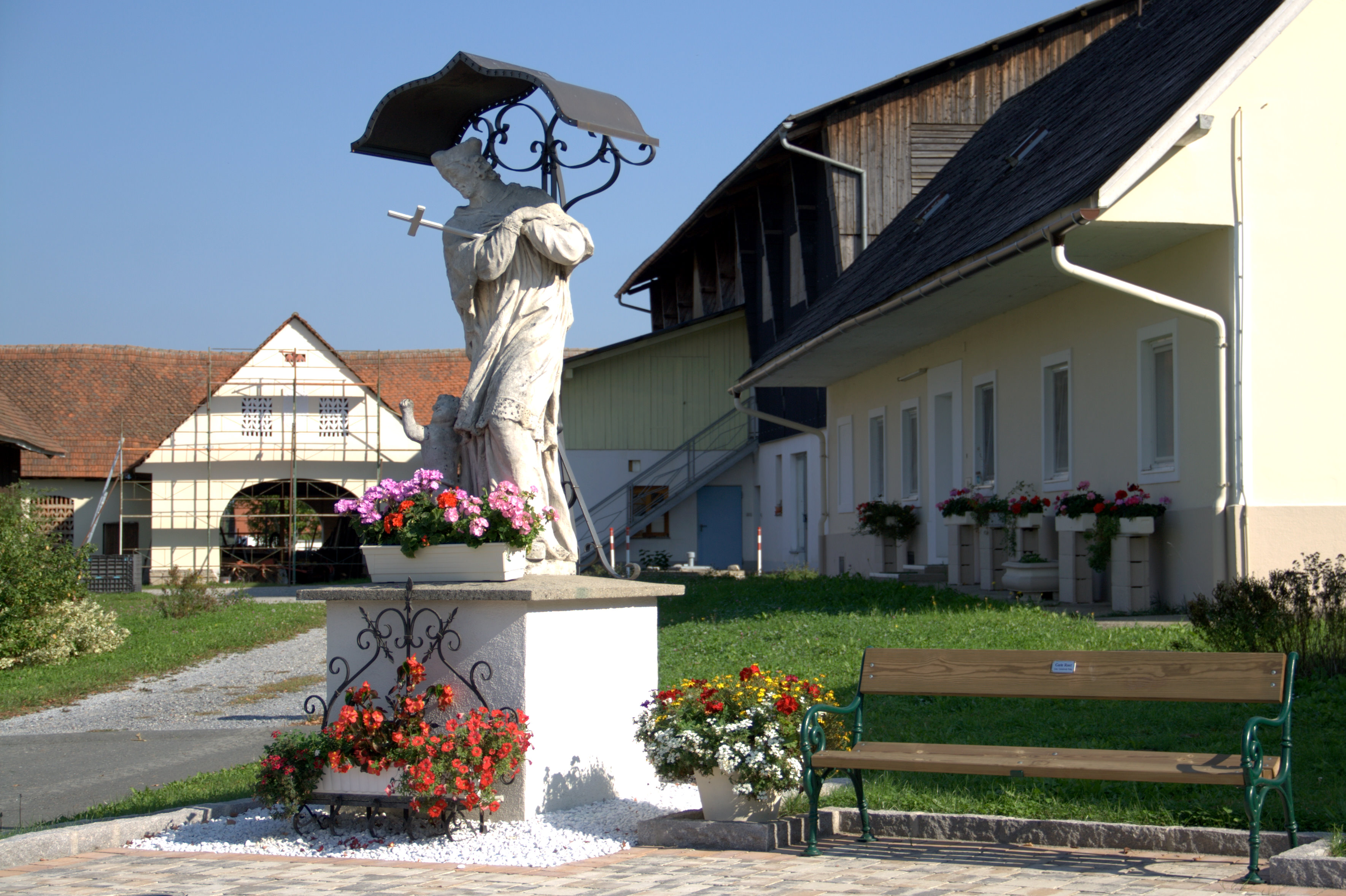
- Main street in Pirka

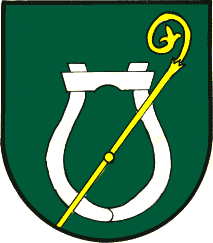
- Coat of arms

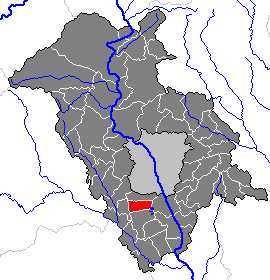
- Location within Graz-Umgebung district

- Location within Austria
- Coordinates: 47°00′06″N 15°23′28″E
- Country: Austria
- State: Styria
- District: Graz-Umgebung

Area
  - Total: 9.43 km^{2} (3.64 sq mi)
- Elevation: 350 m (1,150 ft)

Population (2005-12-31)
  - Total: 3,286
  - Density: 348/km^{2} (903/sq mi)
- Time zone: UTC+1 (CET)
  - Summer (DST): UTC+2 (CEST)
- Postal code: 8054
- Area code: 0316
- Vehicle registration: GU
- Website: www.pirka.steiermark.at

Pirka is a former municipality in the district of Graz-Umgebung in the Austrian state of Styria. Since the 2015 Styria municipal structural reform, it is part of the municipality Seiersberg-Pirka.

== Population ==
Historical population
| Year | Pop. | ±% |
|---|---|---|
| 1869 | 465 | — |
| 1880 | 530 | +14.0% |
| 1890 | 495 | −6.6% |
| 1900 | 473 | −4.4% |
| 1910 | 492 | +4.0% |
| 1923 | 523 | +6.3% |
| 1934 | 665 | +27.2% |
| 1939 | 654 | −1.7% |
| 1951 | 930 | +42.2% |
| 1961 | 1,306 | +40.4% |
| 1971 | 1,659 | +27.0% |
| 1981 | 1,815 | +9.4% |
| 1991 | 2,255 | +24.2% |
| 2001 | 2,759 | +22.4% |
| 2011 | 3,156 | +14.4% |
