= Otto von Stülpnagel =

German military commander (1878–1948)

Otto Edwin von Stülpnagel
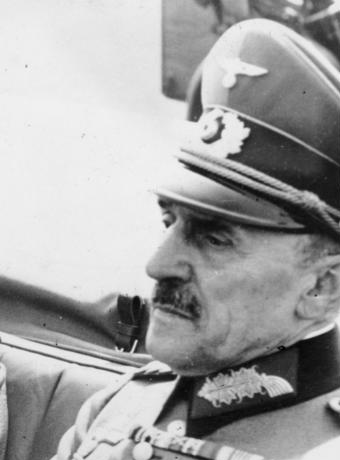
- Stülpnagel in 1941
- Born: 16 June 1878; Berlin, Province of Brandenburg, Kingdom of Prussia, German Empire
- Died: 6 February 1948 (aged 69); Cherche-Midi Prison, Paris, French Fourth Republic
- Burial place: Champigny-Saint-André German war cemetery
- Relatives: ∞ 1929 Ilse Margarete Auguste, divorced von Seydlitz-Kurzbach, née Sohre (1891–1964); 3 stepchildren Carl-Heinrich von Stülpnagel (cousin)
- Military career
- Allegiance: Kingdom of Prussia; German Empire; Weimar Republic; Nazi Germany
- Branch: Prussian Army; Imperial German Army; Freikorps; Reichswehr; Luftwaffe; Heer
- Service years: 1898–1942
- Rank: General der Infanterie
- Conflicts: World War I World War II

Otto Edwin von Stülpnagel (16 June 1878 – 6 February 1948) was a German military commander of occupied France during the Second World War. Arrested by Allied authorities after the war, he committed suicide in prison in 1948.

== Career ==
Otto von Stülpnagel was born on 16 June 1878 in Berlin. He was a member of the Stülpnagel family. He pursued a military career in keeping with his family's long tradition of military service. Commissioned in 1898 and accepted as a member of the Imperial General Staff, he received several decorations for distinguished service on the western front during World War I. Nominated for the Pour le Mérite, Stülpnagel survived personnel cuts mandated by the Treaty of Versailles. Dismayed by accusations of German atrocities, he published an angry defence of German military conduct in a popular book entitled Die Wahrheit über die deutschen Kriegsverbrechen (The Truth about German War Crimes) (1921). Promoted to the rank Generalleutnant (lieutenant general) in 1931, Stülpnagel played a leading role in the Reichswehr in conjunction with Kurt von Schleicher and Erich Freiherr von dem Bussche-Ippenburg during the Weimar era. Transferred to the fledgling Luftwaffe in 1934, Stülpnagel eventually took charge of the air force academy before falling from favour and retiring in March 1939.

Days before the German invasion of Poland, Hitler recalled Stülpnagel to active service and placed him in charge of a military district in Austria (Wehrkreis XVII), and he held the latter post for fourteen months.

=== Military Commander in France ===
On 25 October 1940, German army high command transferred Stülpnagel to France and placed him in charge of a military government with the title of Militärbefehlshaber in Frankreich (MBF; "Military Commander in France"). Not without controversy, this last assignment defined Stülpnagel's career.

Orders from Hitler placed the army and the MBF in charge of "security" but allowed other state and Nazi party agencies to exercise a degree of influence in Occupied France. The German ambassador in Paris, Otto Abetz, first supervised and later controlled diplomatic relations between France and Germany, but that power amounted to little in practice. Hitler would not allow his ambassador to trade concessions for French cooperation, and formal negotiations between the Third Reich and Vichy France came to nought. With control of the flow of vital raw materials, food, and people across the demarcation line that separated occupied from unoccupied France, Stülpnagel could reward French cooperation by allowing people and goods to cross military checkpoints, or he could seal the borders and bring the French economy to a grinding halt. Control over both the demarcation line inside France and borders with Germany and Belgium gave the MBF considerable influence over German policy and French affairs. Thus Stülpnagel played a major role in Franco-German relations between October 1940 and January 1942.

Determined to support the Nazi war effort by placing French industrial resources at the disposal of the German war economy, Stülpnagel discouraged all activities that did not advance the German war effort. The latter goal placed him at loggerheads with Nazi party stalwarts who viewed World War II as a struggle against Jews and their alleged Communist allies. Days after German troops occupied Paris, agents of the Reichsleiter Rosenberg Taskforce and German embassy staff began to confiscate the art collections of prominent French Jews. Upset by the apparent seizure of France's artistic patrimony, the French government complained to German diplomats and the MBF. Eager to maintain cordial relations with the Vichy regime, Stülpnagel and his staff condemned the confiscations through a series of protests that eventually reached Hitler's desk, but to no avail. Hitler eventually exempted the Einsatzstab from military control and sanctioned the wholesale theft of Jewish art collections.

Conflict with the SS followed a similar pattern. Forced to accept an advisory role at the start of the Occupation, the SS complained of the alleged danger of the so-called 'Jewish menace' and pressed MBF to launch an active campaign against "racial opponents" in France, but lacked the authority to act independently. After French Resistance groups shot Colonel Karl Friedrich Hotz in Nantes on 20 October and Hans Gottfried Reimers in Bordeaux on 21 October 1941, Hitler ordered Stülpnagel to execute 100-150 French hostages for each attack. The MBF immediately condemned Hitler's policy through official channels, treated both attacks as a single incident, and shot a total of 98 hostages. Determined to preserve French cooperation, Stülpnagel condemned large-scale executions. In contrast, the SS demonstrated its enthusiasm for Hitler's war against the so-called Jewish conspiracy by bombing seven synagogues in Paris on the night of 2/3 October 1941. Embarrassed by the attacks, Stülpnagel complained to superiors in Berlin, but his repeated protests only reiterated tepid support for Nazi racial policy.

Suspecting the MBF of Francophilia, Field Marshal Wilhelm Keitel, the head of Oberkommando der Wehrmacht (OKW; Armed Forces High Command) grew tired of Stülpnagel's complaints. On 2 February 1942, he directed the MBF to answer all acts of resistance with "sharp deterrents, including the execution of a large number of imprisoned Communists, Jews, or people who carried out previous attacks, and the arrest of at least 1,000 Jews or Communists for later evacuation."

Stülpnagel, who had executed 95 hostages on 15 December 1941, refused to go any further in the implementation of the retaliation policy. He promptly submitted a bitter letter of resignation. Succeeded by his cousin Carl-Heinrich von Stülpnagel, Stülpnagel may have suffered a nervous breakdown. He spent the remainder of the war with his wife in Berlin.

=== Imprisonment and death ===
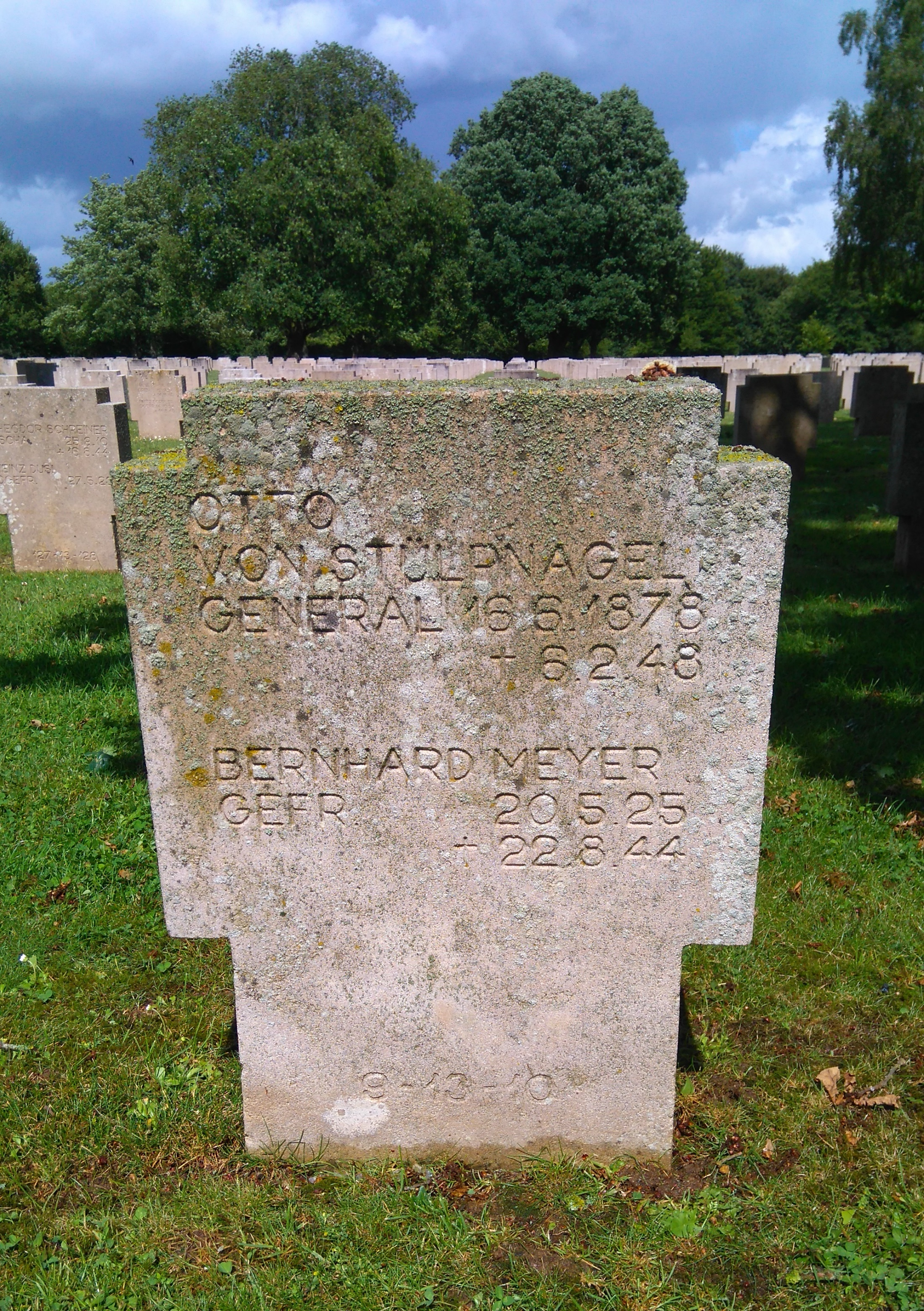
Grave at Champigny-Saint-André German War Cemetery

When arrested by British authorities in December 1946, Stülpnagel wounded himself with a pistol shot. He recovered and was transferred into French custody in a military prison. Charged with war crimes by the French authorities, Stülpnagel committed suicide by hanging himself in his cell in Cherche-Midi Prison on 6 February 1948. He is buried in the Champigny-Saint-André German war cemetery.
