= Friedrich Dollmann =

General during World War II who commanded the 7th Army

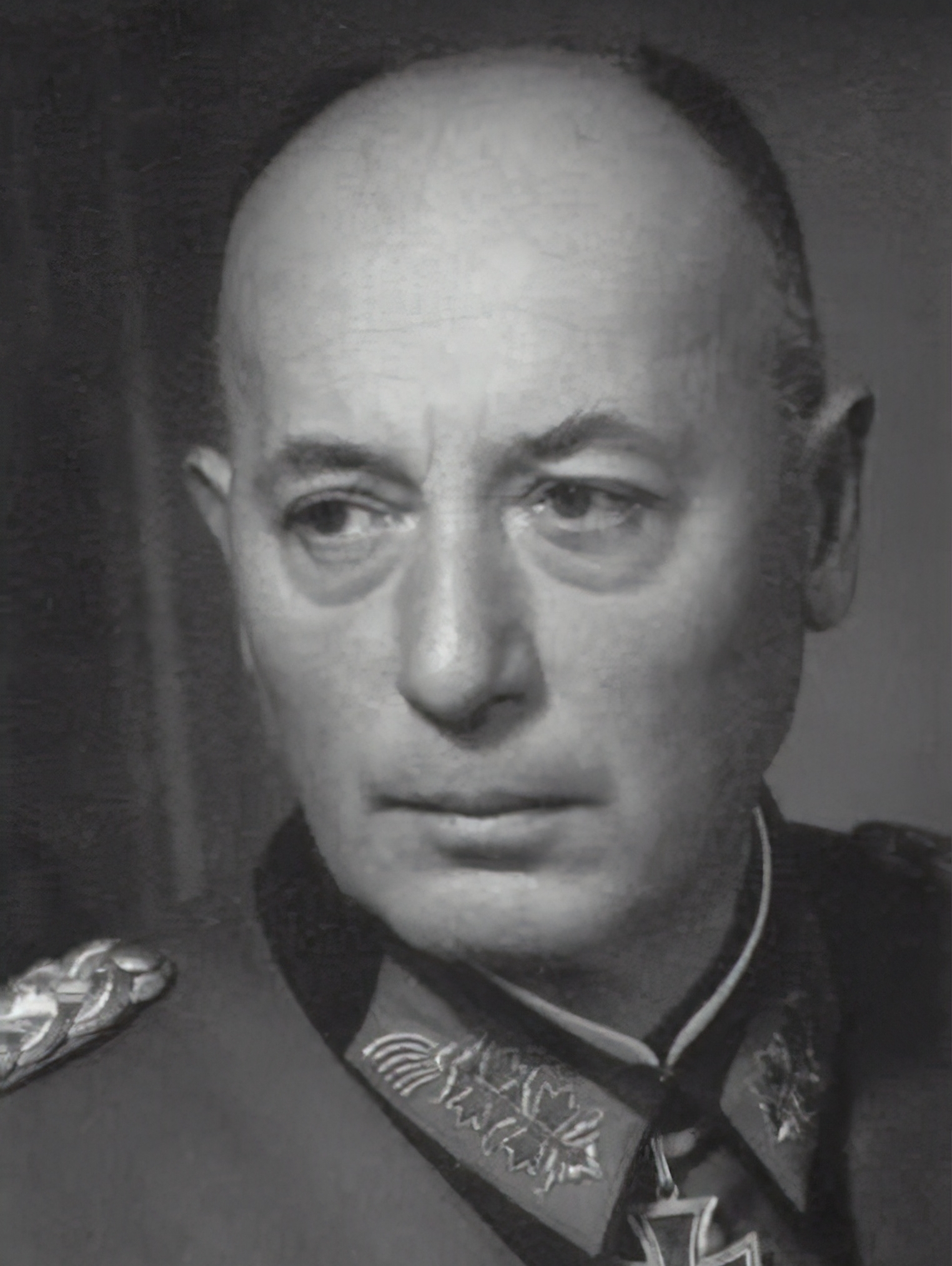
- Born: 2 February 1882; Würzburg, Germany
- Died: 29 June 1944 (aged 62); Le Mans, France
- Burial place: Champigny-Saint-André German war cemetery
- Military career
- Allegiance: German Empire; Weimar Republic; Nazi Germany
- Branch: Imperial German Army; Reichswehr; Nazi Germany
- Service years: 1899–1944
- Rank: Generaloberst
- Commands: 7th Army
- Conflicts: World War I; World War II; Operation Overlord
- Awards: Knight's Cross of the Iron Cross with Oak Leaves

Friedrich Karl Albert Dollmann (2 February 1882 – 29 June 1944) was a German general during World War II who commanded the 7th Army during the Invasion of France and the early phases of the Allied invasion of Normandy until his death in June 1944.

== World War I ==
Born in 1882, Dollmann joined the army in 1899. He studied in the War Academy for General Staff starting in 1909. He served as an aerial observer for the first two years of the First World War. Dollmann was assigned to the wartime General Staff on 5 November 1917, as part of the 6th Infantry Division. He was transferred to the Bavarian General Staff, where on 21 January 1918 he took command of the 6th Army. In March 1919, he was appointed to the Ministry of Military Affairs and then onto the Peace Commission of the General Staff.

Once this assignment was completed, Dollmann served in the central office of the General Staff. Starting 1 October 1919, he worked as a staff officer in the newly created Reichswehr Group Command IV of the Provisional Reichswehr in Munich, a post he retained for one year. On 1 October 1920, he was briefly employed as Adjutant of the Artillery Commander XXI before being assigned commander of the VII Artillery Division. Dollmann was transferred to the staff of the 7th (Bavarian) Division on 1 April 1923. Promoted to lieutenant colonel, Dollmann took over as commander of First Division of the 7th (Bavarian) Artillery Regiment at Würzburg on 1 February 1928. Following this assignment, Dollmann then returned to a former unit, and became Chief of the General Staff of the 7th (Bavarian) Division. During the next few years, Dollmann held various positions, spent some time in the higher artillery command of the Reichswehr, commanded the 6th (Prussian) Artillery Regiment from 1 February 1931 in Minden, and rose to the rank of lieutenant general in 1933.

== Interwar era ==
He took over as Chief of Artillery in the Defense Ministry on 1 February 1933. Subsequent to his brief time as commander of army service Kassel in October 1934, he was appointed Commander of the Military District IX (Hesse-Thuringia West) on 1 May 1935. Having distinguished himself, Dollmann was promoted at the end of 1936 to the rank of full general, along with 11 other officers of the twelve Wehrkreise.

Many historians who have analyzed Dollmann's career and life assert that, while he did exhibit on occasion a pro-Nazi attitude, he was not a committed Nazi. On the other hand, historian Klaus-Jürgen Müller notes that Dollmann's orders were imbued with a discernible Nazi impetus. He therefore believes that Dollmann had a stronger inclination to National Socialism than otherwise presumed. A directive from Dollmann dated 8 February 1935 shows that he instructed his officers to cooperate fully with the authorities of the NSDAP. There is also evidence that he demanded that all his officers should fully support the Nazi Party and admonished them to adjust their opinions accordingly; he even insisted that his officers' wives should actively participate in the National Socialist Women's League. Along similar lines, Dollmann expected his officers to hang pictures of the Führer in their offices and in the mess hall instead of pictures of the Kaiser. In 1937, Dollmann harangued Catholic chaplains for not being fervent enough in their support of the Nazi regime, telling them that as members of the Wehrmacht and bearers of National Socialism, they should always display "a clear and unresolved acknowledgment of the Führer, State, and People!"

On 25 August 1939, Dollmann was elevated to commander of the 7th Army. Just under a week later Hitler ordered the invasion of Poland. Dollmann's only son, who had aspired to the rank of lieutenant in the 15th Infantry Regiment, was killed during the campaign against Poland.

== Invasion of France ==
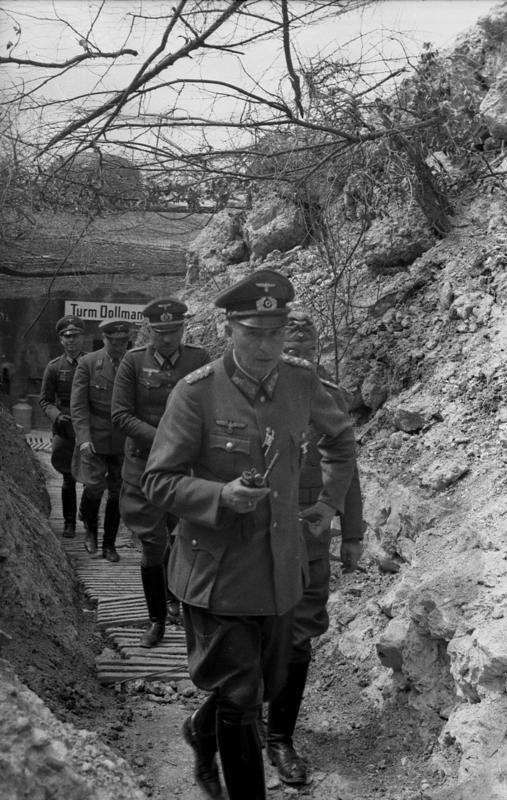
Dollman inspects an artillery observation post that bears his name, near the French border, 1940.

During the invasion of France in 1940, Dollmann's assignment placed him at the southern edge of the Siegfried Line, opposite the Maginot Line. While the French Maginot Line had proven impregnable to frontal assault in the past, Hitler was unconcerned, as its defenses were easily outflanked during the invasion. Throughout the invasion of France, Dollmann's 7th Army was not placed on the offensive until most of the French army had been destroyed, at which point he linked up with the 1st Panzer Division of Panzer Group Guderian, encircling 400,000 French troops in the Vosges Mountains – an action which was followed by a French surrender. Hitler rewarded the participating generals with promotions for their part in this mission, including Dollmann, who thereby attained the rank of Generaloberst (colonel general).

== Occupation of France ==
In the wake of the French defeat, Dollmann's 7th Army remained in the West. Along with Field Marshal Erwin von Witzleben, Dollmann was the only commander of the western campaign who did not see service against the Soviet Union along the Eastern Front. The historian Peter Lieb suggests that the reason might be that Dollmann was considered too inflexible and technically unsuited for the warfare in the East. Dollmann did not keep up with contemporary tactical military developments nor did he follow the course of the war all that closely. Instead he became complacent, overweight, and followed the lead of his immediate superior, Field Marshal Gerd von Rundstedt, neglecting the coastal defenses of France in the process. Rundstedt believed that the best strategy was to allow the Allies to land, build up their forces, and wait for them to advance inland. The Germans could then destroy the Allies in blitzkrieg maneuvers as they attempted to make their way deeper into France. This way, the Germans would be well out of the range of Allied naval guns and could easily secure an advantage.

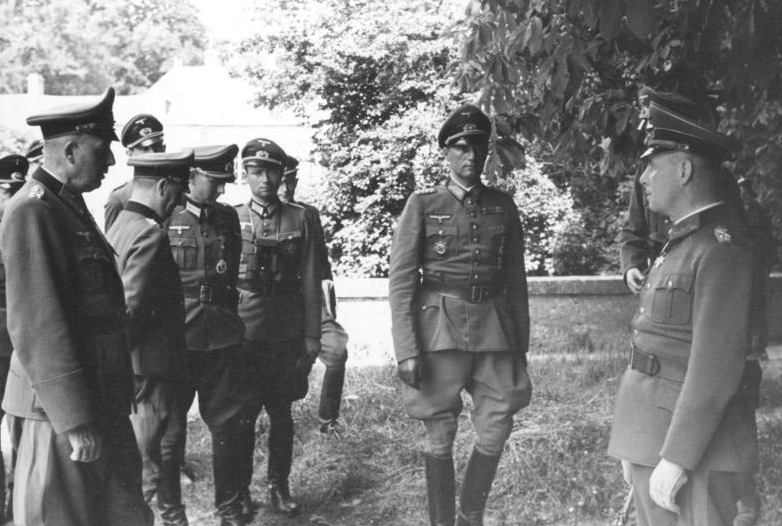
Dollmann (left) in conversation with Edgar Feuchtinger (2nd from right) and Erwin Rommel, France 1944

For four years, Dollmann and Rundstedt did little to fortify the defensive positions along the French coast. Only when his command came under Army Group B Field Marshal Erwin Rommel's scrutiny in December 1943 did Dollmann begin decisive and feverish construction to improve French coastal fortifications. But it was too late. Dollmann's chief of staff claimed that efforts to strengthen the defensive section were not supported by the higher leadership.

Dollman tried to enjoy his time living in France during the occupation, frequently attending religious services and visiting cathedrals and museums. At the same time he fell into a deep depression and let himself go, overindulging in wine and cigars. Meanwhile, Dollmann's deteriorating health was mirrored in his diminishing knowledge of battlefield tactics and the importance of air superiority – all of which made him under-prepared for the imminent Allied invasion of Normandy on D-Day.

Nevertheless, Dollmann was considered an experienced commander; there was no reason to think him incapable. Supporting this notion was an Allied report which identified Dollmann as an "expert in defense". Panzer Group West Commander Leo Geyr von Schweppenburg later confirmed that Dollmann had a much better understanding of the use of armored troops than was previously supposed. History was soon to prove that the German defenses were inadequate to repulse the massive and highly coordinated assault which took place on 6 June 1944.

== D-Day ==
Up to 60 German divisions were tasked with defending 3,000 kilometres (1,900 mi) of coastline from the Riviera to the North Sea, composed of varying troops – Cossacks, Volga Tartars, Georgians, among others, equipped with weapons captured from France, Poland, and Yugoslavia. Aside from what he considered troop deficiencies, Rundstedt thought it ludicrous to scatter the German troops so thinly along the French coast, and disagreed with Rommel's ideas for the Atlantic Wall. The fortifications were inconsistent, with some sections well-constructed while other sections left much to be desired. Also, the ability to direct fire and the capability to deliver firepower along the varying portions of shoreline were equally unreliable.

Several days prior to the invasion, the Germans received intelligence reports about the activities occurring across the channel. Deception measures by the Allied intelligence services kept the Germans convinced that the attack would occur near Norway or close to Calais. Although reconnaissance reports as late as 5 June 1944 indicated that something significant was afoot, none of this intelligence was relayed to the OKW at Berchtesgaden, nor was it forwarded to Dollmann's 7th Army. It is doubtful whether this would have led to a redistribution of forces, since Hitler remained convinced that the main Allied attack would occur at Pas de Calais.

On 5 June 1944, under the cover of darkness, the invasion at Normandy began. By nightfall June 6, up to 130,000 troops and approximately 800 Allied tanks were ashore under a curtain of naval bombardment. On Dollmann's orders, a series of mapping war games had been underway in Rennes, which meant that Dollmann's corps and division commanders were not with their respective units at the time of the attack.

Dollmann tried to organize an immediate counter-attack with the 21st Panzer Division. Lieutenant General Fritz Bayerlein protested; he felt a column march in daytime was merely an invitation to the Allied air forces to decimate his division. He suggested alternative plans, but Dollmann remained adamant. This proved a costly mistake. Throughout the night of 6–7 June 1944, the Allies used their knowledge of the location of the German columns and flares to illuminate the enemy to find suitable targets to attack from the air. The 21st Panzer Division lost five tanks, 40 tank trucks, and 84 other vehicles destroyed. Thus, it was not until 9 June 1944 that Rommel was able to muster his forces.

Part of the effort to repel the Allied attack included strategic placement of troops over what appeared to be a growing front. Dollman's 7th Army (over 16 divisions and five corps commands) was sent to the left wing of the invasion front. They learned on 21 June 1944 that the supplies needed to conduct a sustained resistance could not be assured. Although they rendered vigorous resistance, the German forces could only slow the Allied advance. Throughout the course of defending the coastline and in spite of the disastrous circumstances, Dollmann continued to discipline his soldiers by the threat of severe penalties.

Inaccurate Wehrmacht intelligence reports and Hitler's assurance that a second invasion was due at any moment left the equivalent of an entire German Army Group, comprising five Luftwaffe divisions, two Panzer divisions, and 24 infantry divisions, sitting immobile awaiting further instructions. In the meantime, the German High Command issued orders for Rommel and Rundstedt to launch a massive armored counterattack against an Allied force of "929,000 men, 177,000 vehicles, and 586,000 tons of materiel", an order which was impossible to obey.

== Cherbourg and death ==
The French port of Cherbourg fell on 26 June 1944 when it was surrendered by Lieutenant General Karl-Wilhelm von Schlieben. This enraged Hitler and prompted a court-martial investigation from Field Marshal Wilhelm Keitel. Hitler summoned Rundstedt and Dollmann to Berchtesgaden on 28 June 1944 and insisted that Dollmann be court-martialed. Rundstedt rejected this idea since Dollmann was no more accountable for the failure than himself. Still unsatisfied, Hitler demanded that Dollmann at the very least should be relieved of command, which stimulated another defense, this time from Rommel. Undeterred, Hitler waited until the men left to relieve Dollmann of command, replacing him with Paul Hausser of the Waffen-SS. Hitler relieved Rundstedt of command a short time later.

Unaware that he had been relieved of command, Dollmann was nonetheless worn out and stressed. He died on 29 June 1944. The exact circumstances of his death remain controversial. Some sources say he suffered a heart attack, while others say he committed suicide by taking poison. In 1973, Dollmann's last chief of staff Lieutenant General Max-Josef Pemsel, wrote that on 29 June at around 3:00 in the morning, Dollmann bade farewell to his staff and committed suicide in his command post. In 2003, a theory was put forward that like Rommel, Dollmann was forced to commit suicide by Hitler. He was buried in France on 2 July 1944, where the field marshals Rundstedt, Rommel and Hugo Sperrle were present. On the same day, he received posthumously the Knight's Cross of the Iron Cross with Oak Leaves. Later, Hitler delivered a laudatory obituary on behalf of Dollmann. He is buried at the Champigny-Saint-André German war cemetery.

== Awards ==
- Iron Cross (1914)
  - 2nd Class (18 September 1914)
  - 1st Class (22 February 1916)
- Prince Regent Luitpold Medal with Crown (Prinz-Regent-Luitpold Jubiläums-Medaille mit der Krone) (Bavaria, 1905)
- Service Award Cross, 2nd Class (Bavaria)
- Military Merit Order, 4th Class with Swords (Bavaria, 16 November 1914)
- Honour Cross of the World War 1914/1918 (21 December 1934)
- Wehrmacht Long Service Award, 4th to 1st Class
- Clasp to the Iron Cross (1939)
  - 2nd Class (11 December 1939)
  - 1st Class (10 March 1940)
- Knight's Cross of the Iron Cross with Oak Leaves
  - Knight's Cross on 24 June 1940 as General der Artillerie and commander in chief of the 7. Armee
  - 518th Oak Leaves on 1 July 1944 as Generaloberst and commander-in-chief of the 7. Armee

== Bibliography ==
- Barnett, Correlli, ed. (2003). Hitler’s Generals. New York: Grove Press.
- Boog, Horst, Gerhard Krebs, and Detlef Vogel eds., (2001). Das Deutsche Reich in der Defensive (Das Deutsche Reich und der Zweite Weltkrieg), vol. VII. Stuttgart und München: Deutsche Verlags-Anstalt GmbH.
- Bradley, Dermot ed. (1994). Die Generale des Heeres 1921–1945. Die militärischen Werdegänge der Generale, sowie der Ärzte, Veterinäre, Intendanten, Richter und Ministerialbeamten im Generalsrang. Vol. 3. Osnabrück: Dahlmann–Fitzlaff.
- Brett-Smith, Richard (1976). Hitler's Generals. London: Presidio Press.
- Evans, Richard J. (2010). The Third Reich at War. New York: Penguin.
- Fellgiebel, Walther-Peer (2000) [1986]. Die Träger des Ritterkreuzes des Eisernen Kreuzes 1939–1945 — Die Inhaber der höchsten Auszeichnung des Zweiten Weltkrieges aller Wehrmachtteile [The Bearers of the Knight's Cross of the Iron Cross 1939–1945 — The Owners of the Highest Award of the Second World War of all Wehrmacht Branches] (in German). Friedberg, Germany: Podzun-Pallas.
- Goerlitz, Walter (1985). History of the German General Staff, 1657–1945. Boulder and London: Westview Press.
- Hackl, Othmar (1989). Die Bayerische Kriegsakademie (1867–1914). München: C.H. Beck Verlagsbuchhandlung.
- Harrison, George A. (1970). Cross-Channel Attack. The United States Army in World War II: The European Theater of Operations, 1951. Reprint, Washington, D.C.
- Harrison, Gordon (1993). Cross-Channel Attack. Washington, DC: Center of Military History, U.S. Army.
- Kershaw, Ian (2001). Hitler: 1936–1945, Nemesis. New York: W. W. Norton & Company.
- Leeb, Wilhelm von (1976). Tagebuchaufzeichnungen und Lagebeurteilungen aus zwei Weltkriegen. Edited by Georg Meyer. Stuttgart: Deutsche Verlags-Anstalt.
- Lieb, Peter (2007). Konventioneller Krieg oder NS-Weltanschauungskrieg. Kriegführung und Partisanenbekämpfung in Frankreich 1943/44. München: R. Oldenbourg.
- Mitcham, Samuel (1997). The Desert Fox in Normandy: Rommel's Defense of Fortress Europe. Westport, CT: Praeger Publishers.
- Mitcham, Samuel and Gene Mueller (2012). Hitler’s Commanders: Officers of the Wehrmacht, the Luftwaffe, the Kriegsmarine, and the Waffen-SS. Lanham, MD: Rowman & Littlefield Publishers.
- Müller, Klaus-Jürgen (1969). Das Heer und Hitler. Stuttgart: Deutsche Verlags-Anstalt.
- Overy, Richard (1997). Why the Allies Won. New York: W. W. Norton & Company.
- Preradovich, Nikolaus von (1978). Die militärische und soziale Herkunft der Generalität des deutschen Heeres. Osnabrück: Biblio-Verlag.
- Scherzer, Veit (2007). Die Ritterkreuzträger 1939–1945 Die Inhaber des Ritterkreuzes des Eisernen Kreuzes 1939 von Heer, Luftwaffe, Kriegsmarine, Waffen-SS, Volkssturm sowie mit Deutschland verbündeter Streitkräfte nach den Unterlagen des Bundesarchives [The Knight's Cross Bearers 1939–1945 The Holders of the Knight's Cross of the Iron Cross 1939 by Army, Air Force, Navy, Waffen-SS, Volkssturm and Allied Forces with Germany According to the Documents of the Federal Archives] (in German). Jena, Germany: Scherzers Militaer-Verlag. ISBN 978-3-938845-17-2.
- Taylor, Telford (1995)[1952]. Sword and Swastika: Generals and Nazis in the Third Reich. New York: Barnes & Noble.
- Thomas, Franz (1997). Die Eichenlaubträger 1939–1945 Band 1: A–K [The Oak Leaves Bearers 1939–1945 Volume 1: A–K] (in German). Osnabrück, Germany: Biblio-Verlag. ISBN 978-3-7648-2299-6.
- Wegmüller, Hans (1986). Die Abwehr der Invasion. Die Konzeption des Oberbefehlshabers West 1940–1944. Freiburg im Breisgau: Rombach Verlag.

Military offices
Preceded by none	Commander of 7. Armee; August 25, 1939 – June 28, 1944	Succeeded by Waffen SS General Paul Hausser
