= Otto Abernetty =

Otto Abernetty (March 8, 1893 in Steinbeck-Ancker - July 2, 1940 in Chateaudun) was a Generalmajor der Flieger in the Wehrmacht during World War II. During his career, he was awarded the Cross of Honor for Combatants, 1914–1918, a Long Service Medal 4th Class, 4 Years, a Long Service Medal 3rd Class, 12 Years, a Long Service Medal 2nd Class, 18 Years, a Long Service Medal 1st Class, 25 Years, and an Observer Badge. He also was awarded the Wound Badge. He was killed in a plane crash over France in and is buried at Cimetière militaire allemand de Champigny-St. André.
