= Josef Wurmheller =

German World War II flying ace (1917–1944)

- Josef Wurmheller
- Born: 4 May 1917; Hausham, Kingdom of Bavaria, German Empire
- Died: 22 June 1944 (aged 27) near Alençon, Normandy, French State
- Cause of death: Killed in action
- Burial place: Champigny-Saint-André German war cemetery plot 9—grave 1704
- Military career
- Allegiance: Nazi Germany
- Branch: Luftwaffe
- Service years: 1937–1944
- Rank: Major (major)
- Nickname: "Sepp"
- Units: JG 53, JG 2
- Commands: 9./JG 2, III./JG 2
- Conflicts: See battles World War II: Battle of Britain; Operation Barbarossa; Dieppe Raid; Defense of the Reich †
- Awards: Knight's Cross of the Iron Cross with Oak Leaves and Swords (posthumous)

Josef "Sepp" Wurmheller (4 May 1917 – 22 June 1944) was a German Luftwaffe pilot during World War II, a fighter ace credited with 102 enemy aircraft shot down in over 300 combat missions. He claimed the majority of his aerial victories over the Western Front, and nine over the Eastern Front. Of his 93 victories over the Western Allies, 21 were four-engined bombers and 60 were against Supermarine Spitfire fighters.

Born in Hausham, Wurmheller was a glider pilot in his youth, and volunteered for military service in the Luftwaffe of Nazi Germany in 1937. Following flight training he was posted to Jagdgeschwader 53 (JG 53—53rd Fighter Wing) in 1939. He claimed his first aerial victory on the Western Front on 30 September 1939, a phase of World War II dubbed the Phoney War. He then served as a flight instructor before returning to JG 53 for the Battle of Britain. In June 1941 he participated in Operation Barbarossa, the German invasion of the Soviet Union. He was awarded the Knight's Cross of the Iron Cross on 4 September 1941 after 32 victories. Following another tour as fighter pilot instructor, he was posted to Jagdgeschwader 2 "Richthofen" (JG 2—2nd Fighter Wing) operating on the Channel Front. Wurmheller claimed seven aerial victories during the Dieppe Raid on 19 August 1942 and after his 67th victory was awarded the Knight's Cross of the Iron Cross with Oak Leaves on 1 October 1942.

In April 1943, Wurmheller was appointed Staffelkapitän (squadron leader) of 9. Staffel (9th squadron) of JG 2 "Richthofen". On 8 June 1944, two days after the Allied Invasion of Normandy, he was given command of III. Gruppe (3rd group) of JG 2 "Richthofen". He and his wingman were killed in a mid-air collision during combat near Alençon, France, on 22 June 1944. Wurmheller was posthumously promoted to Major (major) and was awarded the Knight's Cross of the Iron Cross with Oak Leaves and Swords on 24 October 1944.

== Early life and career ==
Wurmheller was born on 4 May 1917 in Hausham in the Kingdom of Bavaria, a federated state of the German Empire. After growing up on his uncle's farm at Schliersee, he spent four years working as a miner like his father. He was also an enthusiastic glider pilot and in 1937 he volunteered for military service in the Luftwaffe. Following training as a fighter pilot, Wurmheller, holding the rank of Unteroffizier (sergeant), was posted to 2. Staffel (2nd squadron) of Jagdgeschwader 53 (JG 53—53rd Fighter Wing) in 1939. (Note: For an explanation of Luftwaffe unit designations, see Organization of the Luftwaffe during World War II.)

== World War II ==
World War II in Europe began on Friday, 1 September 1939, when German forces invaded Poland. On 30 September, elements of I. Gruppe (1st group) of JG 53 encountered a formation of five Royal Air Force (RAF) Fairey Battle single-engined bombers in the vicinity of Saarbrücken during the early Phoney War period. Wurmheller claimed his first victory during this encounter. The Fairey Battle K9283, of No. 150 Squadron flown by Squadron Leader William MacDonald, was on an aerial reconnaissance mission in the area from Metzing to Saarbrücken and crash-landed at Écury-sur-Coole. For this victory, Wurmheller received the Iron Cross 2nd Class (Eisernes Kreuz 2. Klasse) on 19 October 1939. He was posted to the Jagdfliegerschule (fighter pilot school) at Werneuchen as an instructor in November 1939.

=== Battle of Britain and Eastern Front ===
Following a tour as an instructor at the Luftwaffe fighter pilot school, Wurmheller returned to 5. Staffel of JG 53 in June 1940. During the Battle of Britain, he flew combat missions as a fighter pilot and as a fighter-bomber pilot. He claimed four further victories in this campaign and was awarded the Iron Cross 1st Class (Eisernes Kreuz 1. Klasse) on 16 October 1940. He was shot down three times himself by RAF fighters and each time had to bail out. On the third occasion, he was shot down in Messerschmitt Bf 109 E-4 (Werknummer 5242—factory number) at approximately 5:10 pm on 23 November over the English Channel and had to swim for four-and-a-half hours before he was rescued by a Schnellboot (E-boat) of the Kriegsmarine (Navy). Hospitalized until March 1941, he returned to combat duty and claimed two Supermarine Spitfires shot down on 7 May 1941, his 9th and 10th victories.

Wurmheller's unit was subsequently transferred to the Eastern Front in preparation for Operation Barbarossa, the German invasion of the Soviet Union, which began on 22 June 1941. During Barbarossa he was deployed in the southern sector of the German advance. He added nine victories—eight bombers and one Polikarpov I-16 "Rata" fighter—in this theater of operations. His last victory on the Eastern Front, his 19th overall, was claimed on 15 July 1941.

=== Channel Front ===
Jagdgeschwader 2 "Richthofen" Emblem

Wurmheller was transferred back to the Channel Front on 20 July 1941. He was assigned to the Stab (headquarters unit) of II. Gruppe of Jagdgeschwader 2 "Richthofen" (JG 2—2nd Fighter Wing), named after the World War I fighter ace Manfred von Richthofen. He claimed his 20th aerial victory on 24 July 1941 and over a period of four weeks claimed a further 12 victories, all over Spitfires, including five in one day, making him an "ace-in-a-day".

On 30 August 1941, Wurmheller was awarded the Honor Goblet of the Luftwaffe (Ehrenpokal der Luftwaffe), and on 4 September he was awarded the Knight's Cross of the Iron Cross (Ritterkreuz des Eisernen Kreuzes) for 32 aerial victories. His former unit, 5. Staffel of JG 53, had nominated him for the Knight's Cross, but the nomination was not approved until he was assigned to JG 2 "Richthofen". On the same day, his fellow II. Gruppe pilot Oberfeldwebel Kurt Bühligen also received the Knight's Cross. At the time, Wurmheller flew a Bf 109 F-2 from the airbase at St Pol-Bryas.

Following a minor injury, Wurmheller was again posted to the fighter pilot school in Werneuchen as an instructor. Upon his return to front line duty in May 1942, he was posted to 1. Staffel and claimed 10 victories during May 1942 and a further 12 victories the following month. Among these claims were four Spitfires shot down on 31 May and five on 5 June 1942. Most of these missions were flown with Rudolf Pflanz as his wingman.

Wurmheller's most successful day as a fighter pilot was during the Dieppe Raid on 19 August 1942. On that day, the Allies unsuccessfully attacked the German-occupied port of Dieppe. Over 6,000 infantrymen, predominantly Canadian, were supported by a Canadian armored regiment and a strong force of Royal Marines and smaller RAF landing contingents. Wurmheller, whose right foot was plastered in an orthopedic cast, claimed eight victories during the course of four combat missions that day, seven Spitfires and a Bristol Blenheim bomber. The Blenheim most likely was a misidentified Martin Baltimore. He had to abort his first mission due to engine trouble, suffering a minor concussion in the forced landing. He returned from his second mission claiming two Spitfires and a Blenheim shot down. His third mission resulted in the destruction of three more Spitfires, his 56th to 58th victories. Wurmheller claimed another Spitfire shot down on his fourth combat mission. The next day, 20 August, he claimed his 60th aerial victory, which earned him the German Cross in Gold (Deutsches Kreuz in Gold); it was awarded on 21 August.

Wurmheller was promoted to Leutnant (second lieutenant) for bravery in the face of the enemy on 1 October 1942. Following his 67th aerial victory, achieved in about 150 combat missions, he was awarded the Knight's Cross of the Iron Cross with Oak Leaves (Ritterkreuz des Eisernen Kreuzes mit Eichenlaub) on 14 November 1942. He was the 146th officer or soldier of the Wehrmacht so honored.

The United States Army Air Forces (USAAF), in particular the Eighth Air Force, began regular combat when the VIII Bomber Command attacked the Rouen–Sotteville marshalling yards in France on 17 August 1942. Wurmheller claimed four Boeing B-17 Flying Fortress bombers shot down on 3 January 1943. On 1 April 1943 he was appointed Staffelkapitän (squadron leader) of 9. Staffel of JG 2 "Richthofen", succeeding Hauptmann (Captain) Siegfried Schnell, who was transferred to III. Gruppe of Jagdgeschwader 54 (JG 54—54th Fighter Wing). Wurmheller claimed his 70th victory on 17 May, when he shot down a B-17.

On 23 September, Wurmheller was wounded by bomb splinters while making an emergency landing in his Focke-Wulf Fw 190 A-6 during a bombing raid at Vannes–Meucon. "Sepp", as he was named by his comrades, was promoted to Oberleutnant (first lieutenant) on 1 August 1943 and to Hauptmann on 1 November 1943. He claimed his first heavy bomber in the Defense of the Reich campaign on 8 February 1944 in the vicinity of Le Tréport. By March 1944, his total number of aerial victories had reached 92 claims.

=== Group commander and death ===
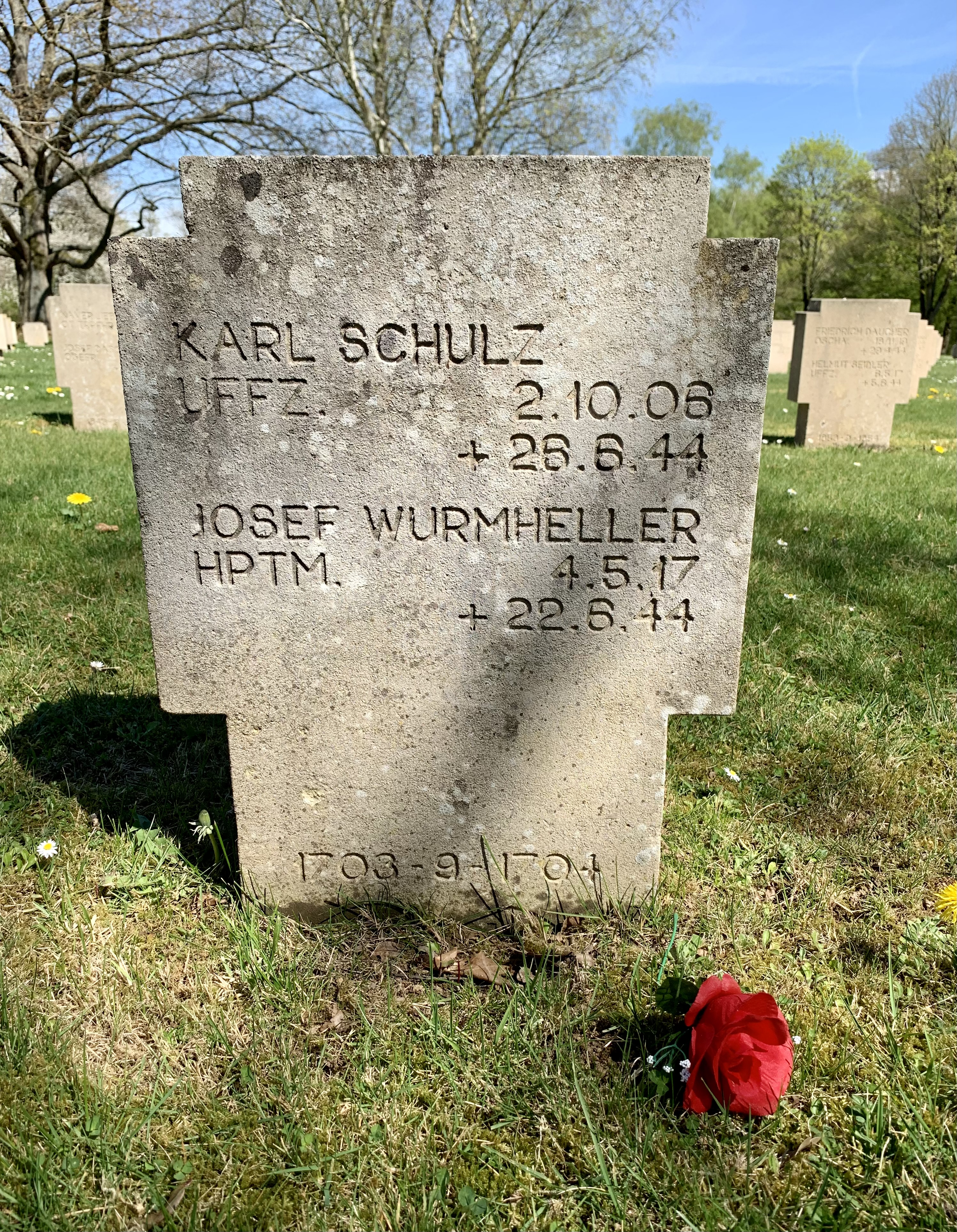
His grave at Champigny-Saint-André

Wurmheller claimed further aerial victories following the Allied invasion of Normandy on 6 June 1944. He was appointed Gruppenkommandeur (group commander) of III. Gruppe of JG 2 "Richthofen" on 8 June, succeeding Hauptmann Herbert Huppertz who was killed in action near Caen earlier that day. Wurmheller claimed the last three victories of his total of 102 on 16 June 1944. He was the 80th Luftwaffe pilot to achieve the century mark.

Wurmheller was killed in his Fw 190 A-8 (Werknummer 171 053) on 22 June 1944, when he collided with his wingman, Feldwebel (Staff Sergeant) Kurt Franzke, during aerial combat with USAAF Republic P-47 Thunderbolt and Royal Canadian Air Force (RCAF) Spitfire fighters near Alençon. He was posthumously awarded the Knight's Cross of the Iron Cross with Oak Leaves and Swords (Ritterkreuz des Eisernen Kreuzes mit Eichenlaub und Schwertern) and promoted to the rank of Major (major) on 24 October 1944, which was back-dated to 1 June 1944. According to Goss, his victor may have been Pilot Officer J.W. Flemming from No. 441 Fighter Squadron. Wurmheller and Franzke were buried beside each other at the Champigny-Saint-André German war cemetery, near Saint-André-de-l'Eure, in plot 9, graves 1704 and 1705 respectively. Command of III. Gruppe of JG 2 was then given to Hauptmann Siegfried Lemke.

== Summary of career ==
=== Aerial victory claims ===
According to US historian David T. Zabecki, Wurmheller was credited with 102 aerial victories. Mathews and Foreman, authors of Luftwaffe Aces – Biographies and Victory Claims, researched the German Federal Archives and found records for 103 aerial victory claims, plus five further unconfirmed claims. This figure of confirmed claims includes nine Soviet Air Forces piloted aircraft on the Eastern Front and 94 on the Western Front, including 21 four-engined bomber.

Victory claims were logged to a map-reference (PQ = Planquadrat), for example "PQ 3841". The Luftwaffe grid map (Jägermeldenetz) covered all of Europe, western Russia and North Africa and was composed of rectangles measuring 15 minutes of latitude by 30 minutes of longitude, an area of about 360 square miles (930 km^{2}). These sectors were then subdivided into 36 smaller units to give a location area 3 km × 4 km (1.9 mi × 2.5 mi) in size.

Chronicle of aerial victories
This and the ♠ (Ace of spades) indicates those aerial victories which made Wurmheller an "ace-in-a-day", a term which designates a fighter pilot who has shot down five or more airplanes in a single day. This along with the * (asterisk) indicates an Herausschuss (separation shot)—a severely damaged heavy bomber forced to separate from his combat box which was counted as an aerial victory. This and the – (dash) indicates unwitnessed aerial victory claims for which Wurmheller did not receive credit. This and the ? (question mark) indicates information discrepancies listed by Prien, Stemmer, Rodeike, Bock, Mathews and Foreman. This and the ! (exclamation mark) indicates those aerial victories listed by Prien, Stemmer, Rodeike and Bock. This and the # (hash mark) indicates those aerial victories listed by Mathews and Foreman.
Claim!	Claim#	Date	Time	Type	Location	Claim!	Claim#	Date	Time	Type	Location
– 2. Staffel of Jagdgeschwader 53 – "Phoney War" — 1 September 1939 – 9 May 1940
1	—	30 September 1939	12:10	Battle	west of Saarbrücken						
– 5. Staffel of Jagdgeschwader 53 – Action at the Channel and over England — 26 June 1940 – 8 June 1941
2	1	28 September 1940	13:45	Spitfire	vicinity of Portland	7	6	9 April 1941	17:21	Spitfire	south of Dover
3	2	30 September 1940	17:43	Hurricane	20 km (12 mi) north of Portland	8	7	10 April 1941	18:43	Blenheim	
4	3	12 October 1940	12:15	Spitfire	60 km (37 mi) northwest of Brest	9	8	7 May 1941	07:47	Spitfire	Deal
5	4	16 October 1940	15:20	Blenheim	north-northeast of Ile d'Ouessant	10	9	7 May 1941	07:47	Spitfire	Deal
6	5	4 April 1941	11:18	Spitfire	20 km (12 mi) north of Wissant						
– 5. Staffel of Jagdgeschwader 53 – Operation Barbarossa — 22 June – 8 October 1941
11	10	22 June 1941	18:01	SB-2	vicinity of Tauroggen	16	15	6 July 1941	19:45? (Note: According to Mathews and Foreman claimed at 19:47.)	SB-3	
12	11	23 June 1941	09:00	SB-3		17	16	11 July 1941	03:25	I-16? (Note: According to Mathews and Foreman claimed as a Curtiss P-40 Warhawk.)	
13	12	1 July 1941	19:50	SB-3		18	17	12 July 1941	19:46	SB-3	
14	13	4 July 1941	14:52	SB-3		19	18	15 July 1941	18:35	SB-3? (Note: According to Mathews and Foreman claimed as an Ilyushin DB-3.)	
15	14	6 July 1941	19:45	SB-3							
– Stab II. Gruppe of Jagdgeschwader 2 "Richthofen" – On the Western Front — 22 June – 31 December 1941
	—	24 July 1941	12:25	Spitfire	Hazebrouck	26	25	18 August 1941	16:16	Spitfire	Lille/Calais
20	19	24 July 1941	12:26	Spitfire		27	26	21 August 1941	15:08	Spitfire	
21	20	7 August 1941	07:52	Spitfire		28	27	26 August 1941	19:23	Spitfire	
22	21	7 August 1941	17:47	Spitfire		29	28	26 August 1941	19:24	Spitfire	
23		7 August 1941	—	P-40		30	29	27 August 1941	09:30	Spitfire	Thérouanne
	22	16 August 1941	16:05	Spitfire		31	30	29 August 1941	08:30	Spitfire	
24	23	16 August 1941	19:40	Spitfire		32	31	4 September 1941	17:38	Spitfire	Saint-Omer/Béthune
25	24	18 August 1941	16:05	Spitfire	Lille/Calais						
– 1. Staffel of Jagdgeschwader 2 "Richthofen" – On the Western Front — 1 January – 31 December 1942
33	32	17 May 1942	14:02	Spitfire		—	—	5 June 1942	—	Spitfire	
34	33	19 May 1942	20:45	Spitfire		52	51	20 June 1942	15:51	Spitfire	northwest of Fécamp
35	34	19 May 1942	20:47	Spitfire	10 km (6.2 mi) north-northwest of Calais	53	52	20 June 1942	15:52	Spitfire	northwest of Fécamp
36	35	19 May 1942	20:49	Spitfire		54♠	53	19 August 1942	09:08	Spitfire	3 km (1.9 mi) west of Dieppe
37	36	30 May 1942	21:30	Spitfire		55♠	54	19 August 1942	09:12	Spitfire	4 km (2.5 mi) west of Dieppe
38	37	30 May 1942	21:30	Spitfire		56♠	55	19 August 1942	09:16	Blenheim	9 km (5.6 mi) southeast of Dieppe
39	38	31 May 1942	19:32	P-40			56	19 August 1942	15:16	Spitfire	10–15 km (6.2–9.3 mi) north of Dieppe
40	39	31 May 1942	19:33	P-40			57	19 August 1942	15:17	Spitfire	10–15 km (6.2–9.3 mi) north of Dieppe
41	40	31 May 1942	19:35	Spitfire		57♠	58	19 August 1942	15:22	Spitfire	1 km (0.62 mi) north-northwest of Dieppe
42	41	31 May 1942	19:37	Spitfire		58♠	59	19 August 1942	17:32	Spitfire	15–20 km (9.3–12.4 mi) northwest of Dieppe
43	42	2 June 1942	10:58	Spitfire	over sea at Dieppe, vicinity of Le Tréport		60	19 August 1942	18:45	Spitfire	vicinity of Dieppe
44	43	2 June 1942	11:00	Spitfire	over sea at Dieppe, vicinity of Le Tréport	59	61	20 August 1942	19:02	Spitfire	70 km (43 mi) north of Le Havre; 100 km (62 mi) north of Caen
45	44	2 June 1942	11:04	Spitfire	over sea at Dieppe, vicinity of Le Tréport	—	62	20 August 1942	19:04	Spitfire	85 km (53 mi) northwest of Le Havre; 100–105 km (62–65 mi) north of Caen
46	45	3 June 1942	16:47	Spitfire	over sea in the vicinity of Le Havre	60	63	8 September 1942	14:39	Spitfire	over sea, northwest of Le Havre
47	46	3 June 1942	16:50	Spitfire	over sea in the vicinity of Le Havre	61	64	8 September 1942	14:40	Spitfire	over sea, northwest of Le Havre
48	47	5 June 1942	15:45	Spitfire	Somme Estuary, vicinity of Abbeville	62	65	2 October 1942	15:43	Spitfire	north of Fécamp
49	48	5 June 1942	15:45	Spitfire	Somme Estuary, vicinity of Abbeville	63	66	31 October 1942	18:08	Spitfire	3 km (1.9 mi) southeast of Canterbury
50	49	5 June 1942	15:46	Spitfire	Somme Estuary, vicinity of Abbeville	64	67	31 October 1942	18:12	Spitfire	southeast of Walmer
51	50	5 June 1942	15:46	Spitfire							
– 1. Staffel of Jagdgeschwader 2 "Richthofen" – On the Western Front — 1 January – 31 December 1943
65	68	16 February 1943	11:15	B-17	25 km (16 mi) northeast of Vannes; PQ 3841	67	70	12 March 1943	13:11	Typhoon	50 km (31 mi) north of Fécamp
66	69	16 February 1943	11:18	B-17	Landévant; PQ 4829						
– 9. Staffel of Jagdgeschwader 2 "Richthofen" – On the Western Front — 1 January – 31 December 1943
68	71	16 April 1943	14:25	B-17	PQ 14 West 4838	77	—	14 August 1943	13:55	Spitfire	5 km (3.1 mi) south of Fruer
69	72	1 May 1943	11:30	B-17	PQ 14 West 3876	78	80	16 August 1943	12:28	Spitfire	5 km (3.1 mi) southwest of Bernay
70	73	17 May 1943	12:17	B-17	PQ 14 West 4845; Lorient/Saint-Brieuc	79	81	22 August 1943	19:50	Spitfire	PQ 05 Ost 0067 vicinity of Bernay
71	74	29 May 1943	16:25	B-17	PQ 14 West 2939; PQ 14 West 29359	80	82	27 August 1943	09:45? (Note: According to Mathews and Foreman claimed at 09:46.)	Spitfire	PQ 05 Ost 0037; PQ 05 Ost 0047
72	75	29 May 1943	16:27	B-17	PQ 14 West 2939; PQ 14 West 2919	81	83	2 September 1943	19:05	P-47	PQ 05 Ost 1034
73	76	28 June 1943	17:10	B-17	PQ 14 West 3875 vicinity of Saint-Nazaire	82	84	3 September 1943	09:47	B-17	PQ 04 Ost 29317
74	77	4 July 1943	13:09	B-17	PQ 14 West 4725	83	85	3 September 1943	10:48	B-17	PQ 15 West 1015
75	78	4 July 1943	13:11	B-17	PQ 14 West 4713; PQ 14 West 72131	84	86	11 September 1943	18:13	Spitfire	PQ 05 Ost 0049
76	79	3 August 1943	20:26	Spitfire	10 km (6.2 mi) north-northeast of Brest	85	87	15 September 1943	19:41	B-17	Saint-Germain-en-Laye
– 9. Staffel of Jagdgeschwader 2 "Richthofen" – On the Western Front — 1 January – 8 June 1944
86	88	29 January 1944	11:04	B-24	PQ 05 Ost 4021	93	94	2 March 1944	11:35	B-17	Charleville
87		29 January 1944	11:04	P-47		94	95	16 March 1944	10:40	B-24*	PQ 04 Ost 4912 west of Saint-Dizier
88	89	8 February 1944	10:26	B-17	PQ 05 Ost 2049; Crèvecœur/Le Tréport	95	96	10 April 1944	09:26	B-17	PQ 04 Ost N/292; Dormans
	—	20 February 1944	14:20	B-24	20 km (12 mi) northwest of Étretat	96	97	10 April 1944	09:28	P-38	PQ 04 Ost N/292; Dormans
89	90	24 February 1944	12:40	B-17*	PQ 05 Ost 73489	97	98	12 April 1944	13:10	B-24*	PQ 05 Ost 418
90	91	25 February 1944	11:26	B-26	PQ 05 Ost 224; 20 km (12 mi) north of Knokke	98	99	7 June 1944	06:03	Typhoon	PQ 15 West TT/TU, over sea
91	92	25 February 1944	11:28	B-26	PQ 05 Ost 224; 20 km (12 mi) north of Knokke	99	100	8 June 1944	09:25	P-51	PQ 15 West TU-7 north of Caen
92	93	25 February 1944	15:28	B-17	Bad Mondorf						
– Stab III. Gruppe of Jagdgeschwader 2 "Richthofen" –
100	101	12 June 1944	10:44	P-47	PQ 05 Ost UA-1/2; Lisieux	102	103	16 June 1944	19:52	P-51	PQ 05 Ost 1083
101	102	12 June 1944	10:48	P-47	PQ 15 West UU-6; Caen						

=== Awards ===
- Wound Badge in Black
- Front Flying Clasp of the Luftwaffe in Gold with Pennant "400"
- Combined Pilots-Observation Badge
- Iron Cross (1939)
  - 2nd Class (19 October 1939)
  - 1st Class (16 October 1940)
- Honor Goblet of the Luftwaffe (30 August 1941)
- German Cross in Gold on 21 August 1942 as Oberfeldwebel in the I./Jagdgeschwader 2
- Knight's Cross of the Iron Cross with Oak Leaves and Swords
  - Knight's Cross on 4 September 1941 as Oberfeldwebel and pilot in the 9./Jagdgeschwader 2 "Richthofen" (Note: According to Scherzer as pilot in the 5./Jagdgeschwader 2 "Richthofen", and according to Von Seemen as pilot in the III./Jagdgeschwader 2 "Richthofen".)
  - 146th Oak Leaves on 13 November 1942 as Leutnant (war officer) and pilot in the 7./Jagdgeschwader 2 "Richthofen" (Note: According to Scherzer on 14 November 1942.)
  - 108th Swords on 24 October 1944 (posthumously) as Hauptmann (war officer) and Gruppenkommandeur of the III./Jagdgeschwader 2 "Richthofen" (Note: According to Von Seemen as tasked with the leadership of the III./Jagdgeschwader 2 "Richthofen".)
