= Friedrich Wachowiak =

German World War II flying ace (1920–1944)

- Born: 13 February 1920; Dortmund, Weimar Republic
- Died: 16 July 1944 (aged 24); Caen, German-occupied France
- Burial place: Cimetière militaire allemand de Champigny-St. André; Plot 17—grave 2032
- Military career
- Allegiance: Nazi Germany
- Branch: Luftwaffe
- Service years: 1939–1944
- Rank: Leutnant (second lieutenant)
- Units: JG 52, JG 3
- Conflicts: See battles World War II: Eastern Front; Operation Barbarossa; Operation Blue; Battle of the Caucasus; Western Front; Battle of Normandy †
- Awards: Knight's Cross of the Iron Cross

Friedrich Wachowiak (13 February 1920 – 16 July 1944) was a German military aviator who served in the Luftwaffe during World War II. As a fighter ace, he was credited with 89, potentially up to 140, aerial victories—that is, 89 aerial combat encounters resulting in the destruction of the enemy aircraft—claimed in an unknown number of combat missions. All of his documented victories were claimed over the Eastern Front.

Wachowiak was born in Somborn, present-day part of Dortmund, and following fighter pilot training was posted to Jagdgeschwader 52 (JG 52—52nd Fighter Wing) in July 1940. He claimed his first aerial victory on 24 June 1941 during Operation Barbarossa, the German invasion of the Soviet Union. He was awarded the Knight's Cross of the Iron Cross in April 1942. In 1943 and early 1944, he served as a fighter pilot instructor and came back to the front in May 1944. He was then posted to Jagdgeschwader 3 "Udet" (JG 3—3rd Fighter Wing) and was killed in action on 16 July 1944 fighting against the Western Allies over Normandy.

== Career ==
Wachowiak was born on 13 February 1920 in Somborn, present-day part of Dortmund, at the time in the Province of Westphalia of the Weimar Republic. Trained as fighter pilot, (Note: Flight training in the Luftwaffe progressed through the levels A1, A2 and B1, B2, referred to as A/B flight training. A training included theoretical and practical training in aerobatics, navigation, long-distance flights and dead-stick landings. The B courses included high-altitude flights, instrument flights, night landings and training to handle the aircraft in difficult situations.) Wachowiak was posted to 8. Staffel (8th squadron) of Jagdgeschwader 52 (JG 52—52nd Fighter Wing) on 29 July 1940 holding the rank of Obergefreiter. At the time, 8. Staffel was commanded by Oberleutnant Günther Rall. The Staffel was subordinated to III. Gruppe (3rd group) of JG 52 temporarily headed by Hauptmann Wilhelm Ensslin after its former commander Major Wolf-Heinrich von Houwald was killed in action on 24 July.

The rise of General Ion Antonescu in Romania in 1940 led to a reorganization of his country's armed forces. In this, he was supported by a military mission from Germany, the Luftwaffenmission Rumänien (Luftwaffe Mission Romania) under the command of Generalleutnant (equivalent to major general) Wilhelm Speidel. III. Gruppe of JG 52 was transferred to Bucharest in mid-October and temporarily renamed I. Gruppe of Jagdgeschwader 28 (JG 28—28th Fighter Wing) until 4 January 1941. Its primary task was to train Romanian Air Force personnel. The Gruppe was placed under the command of Major Gotthard Handrick who had previously served on the staff of Luftwaffenmission Rumänien. 8. Staffel arrived at Pipera Airfield on 15 October where they stayed until 18 November when they moved to Leipzig-Mockau Airfield. Three days later, 8. Staffel moved to Parndorf in Austria. On 30 November, the Staffel began relocating back to Pipera Airfield where they arrived on 2 December, staying there until 27 May 1941.

=== War against the Soviet Union ===
On 21 June 1941, III. Gruppe was ordered to Mizil in preparation of Operation Barbarossa, the German invasion of the Soviet Union. Its primary objective was to provide fighter protection for the oil fields and refineries at Ploiești. The invasion of the Soviet Union began on 22 June. The next day, the Gruppe moved to Mamaia, the northern district of Constanța on the Black Sea coast. There, Wachowiak claimed his first two aerial victories on 24 June. He was credited with shooting down two Soviet Ilyushin DB-3 bombers in the morning near Constanța. Two days later, he claimed another DB-3 bomber in the same combat area.

III./JG 52 emblem

The Gruppe moved to Belaya Tserkov on 1 August during the Battle of Kiev and also used an airfield at Yampil from 6 to 8 August. There, Wachowiak claimed two Polikarpov I-16 fighter on 4 August near Kiev. Five days later, he was credited with a Tupolev SB-2 bomber. On 17 August, Wachowiak shot down a Polikarpov I-15 fighter. On 27 August, III. Gruppe had reached an airfield named Stschastliwaja located approximately 20 kilometers (12 miles) east-southeast of Oleksandriia where they stayed until 12 September. The Gruppe then moved to an airfield at Taganrog on 2 November where they stayed until 1 January 1942. In December 1941, Wachowiak claimed nine aerial victories, an I-16 fighter on 5 December, another I-16 the next day followed by two further I-16 fighters on 7 December. On 9 December, he was credited with three I-15 fighters. His last claims of 1941 were filed on 11 December over two SB-2 bombers. For this, Wachowiak was awarded the Honor Goblet of the Luftwaffe (Ehrenpokal der Luftwaffe) on 15 December.

On 1 January 1942, III. Gruppe relocated to Kharkov where they fought in the Barvenkovo–Lozovaya offensive and remained until 29 April. Wachowiak claimed his first aerial victories in 1942 on 15 January over two Polikarpov I-153 fighters. On 22 January, he received the German Cross in Gold (Deutsches Kreuz in Gold). On 5 April, Wachowiak was awarded the Knight's Cross of the Iron Cross (Ritterkreuz des Eisernen Kreuzes) following his 46th aerial victory. On 29 April, III. Gruppe had relocated to Zürichtal, a small village at the Inhul in the former German settlement west of Feodosia in the Crimea during the Crimean campaign. On 1 May, the Gruppe was subordinated to VIII. Fliegerkorps and was supporting the 11th Army in the Battle of the Kerch Peninsula and the Siege of Sevastopol. Here, Wachowiak claimed five aerial victories taking his total to 53.

On 12 May, German forces launched Operation Fredericus, also referred to as the Second Battle of Kharkov, with the objective to eliminate the Izium bridgehead over Seversky Donets. That day, III. Gruppe was moved to the Kharkov-Rogan airfield, southeast of Kharkov, and subordinated to the Stab (headquarters unit) of JG 52. Two days later, III. Gruppe predominantly flew fighter escort missions for Junkers Ju 87 dive bombers from VIII. Fliegerkorps attacking Soviet ground forces on the northern pincer, and claimed 52 aerial victories for the loss of one aircraft damaged. That day, Wachowiak became an "ace-in-a-day" when he shot down five Mikoyan-Gurevich MiG-1 fighters. On 26 June, III. Gruppe then moved to Bely Kolodez where they stayed until 3 July. By this date, Wachowiak had accumulated 64 aerial victories, making him the fourth most successful fighter pilot of III. Gruppe.

On 28 June, German forces had launched Case Blue, the strategic summer offensive in southern Russia. On 7 July, Army Group A began their advance towards the oil fields in the Caucasus. On 19 July, III. Gruppe relocated to Taganrog where they converted from the Messerschmitt Bf 109 F-4 variant to the Bf 109 G-2. On 13 August, III. Gruppe had reached Mineralnye Vody in the North Caucasus region. Here, Wachowiak claimed two I-153 fighters shot down on 25 August and two MiG-1 fighters the next day. On 27 August, III. Gruppe reached an airfield named Gonschtakowka located north-northeast of Mozdok on the Terek. The Gruppe stayed at Gonschtakowka until 19 September. In this period, Wachowiak claimed eight aerial victories, a MiG-1 on 28 August, an I-16 on 29 August, a Lavochkin-Gorbunov-Gudkov LaGG-3 fighter on 5 September, another LaGG-3 and a Petlyakov Pe-2 bomber on 7 September, another LaGG-3 the next day, a MiG-1 on 14 September, and a Sukhoi Su-2 light bomber on 17 September. On 19 September, III. Gruppe reached an airfield named Soldatskaya, west of Mozdok. The Gruppe would remain here until 1 January 1943 but would also use airfields at Mozdok and Digora.

=== Instructor, Western Front and death ===
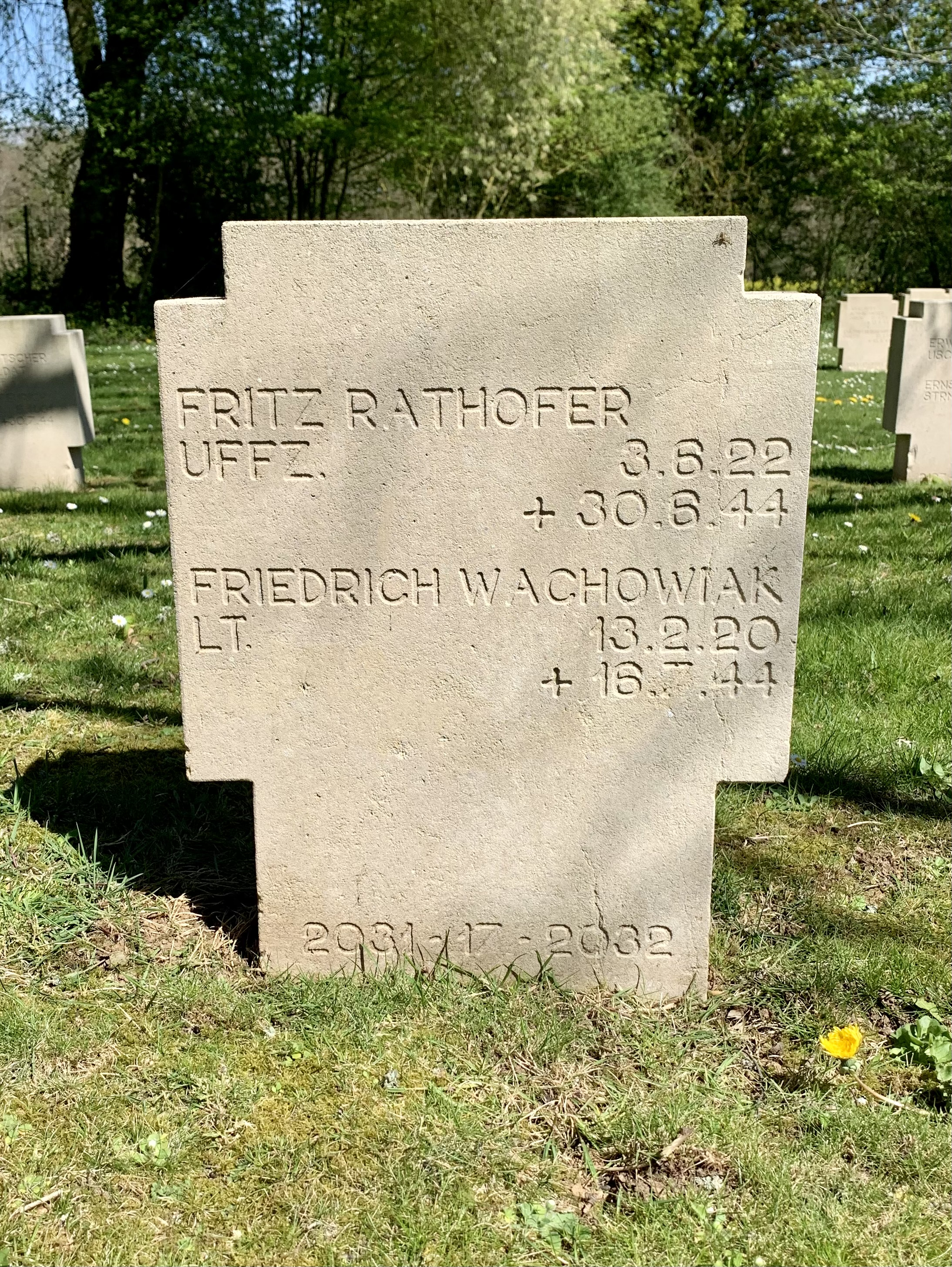
His grave at the Champigny-Saint-André German war cemetery

In 1943 and early 1944, Wachowiak served as a fighter pilot instructor. While serving with II. Gruppe of Ergänzungs-Jagdgeschwader 1 (EJG 1—1st Supplementary Fighter Wing), a Luftwaffe replacement training unit, he trained Croatian fighter pilots of the Croatian Air Force Legion at Saint-Jean-d'Angély. Some of these pilots later served with 15. Staffel of JG 52.

In May 1944, Wachowiak was posted to 7. Staffel of JG 52. At the time, III. Gruppe was based at Cape Chersonesus located at the Sevastopol Bay and led by Major Wilhelm Batz. He claimed first aerial victory following his tour as a fighter pilot instructor on 6 May over an Ilyushin Il-2 ground-attack aircraft. The following day, he was credited with the destruction of a Yakovlev Yak-9 fighter. The Gruppe then relocated a few times before moving to an airfield at Roman on 18 May. There, Wachowiak claimed his last documented aerial victory when he shot down a Pe-2 bomber on 29 May.

The Staffel, under the commanded by Oberleutnant Eberhard Fischler Graf von Treuberg, was withdrawn from the Eastern Front and transferred west to fight in Defense of the Reich. The Staffel was subordinated to III. Gruppe of Jagdgeschwader 3 "Udet" (JG 3—3rd Fighter Wing) led by Major Karl-Heinz Langer. There, the Staffel was later redesignated and became the 12. Staffel of JG 3. The transfer order had been issued on 29 May. The pilots and ground staff were taken by train to Salzwedel. The Staffel was then ordered to Chartres Airfield.

Wachowiak was killed in action on 16 July 1944 on the Normandy invasion front. He was among the first pilots killed following the relocation to the Western Front. Of the original sixteen pilots transferred, only two pilots survived the war. Wachowiak was shot down in his Bf 109 G-6 (Werknummer 165507—factory number) during aerial combat with a Supermarine Spitfire near Écouché. According to Mathews and Foreman, Wachowiak may have been shot down by Spitfire fighters from the Royal Canadian Air Force (RCAF) No. 403 Squadron. He was posthumously recommended for the Knight's Cross of the Iron Cross with Oak Leaves (Ritterkreuz des Eisernen Kreuzes mit Eichenlaub), but the recommendation was not approved.

== Summary of career ==
=== Aerial victory claims ===
According to US historian David T. Zabecki, Wachowiak was credited with 140 aerial victories. Schreier lists him with 130 aerial victories. According to Obermaier, the exact number of aerial victories Wachowiak was credited with is not exactly known. Obermaier states that he claimed at least 86 aerial victories on the Eastern Front. His mother testified that he had claimed approximately 120 aerial victories, while his comrades claim that he shot down about 140 aircraft. Spick also states that Wachowiak was credited with at least 86 aerial victories, all of which claimed over the Eastern Front in an unknown number of combat missions. According to Rall, who was Wachowiak's commanding officer and regular wingman, Wachowiak had approximately 100 aerial victories by August 1942. Mathews and Foreman, authors of Luftwaffe Aces — Biographies and Victory Claims, researched the German Federal Archives and found records for 89 aerial victories, all of which claimed on the Eastern Front.

Victory claims were logged to a map-reference (PQ = Planquadrat), for example "PQ 44423". The Luftwaffe grid map (Jägermeldenetz) covered all of Europe, western Russia and North Africa and was composed of rectangles measuring 15 minutes of latitude by 30 minutes of longitude, an area of about 360 square miles (930 km^{2}). These sectors were then subdivided into 36 smaller units to give a location area 3 km × 4 km (1.9 mi × 2.5 mi) in size.

Chronicle of aerial victories
This and the ♠ (Ace of spades) indicates those aerial victories which made Wachowiak an "ace-in-a-day", a term which designates a fighter pilot who has shot down five or more airplanes in a single day. This and the ? (question mark) indicates information discrepancies listed by Barbas, Prien, Stemmer, Rodeike, Bock, Mathews and Foreman.
| Claim | Date | Time | Type | Location | Claim | Date | Time | Type | Location |
– 8. Staffel of Jagdgeschwader 52 – Operation Barbarossa — 22 June – 5 December 1941
| 1 | 24 June 1941 | 07:15 | DB-3 | Constanța | 14 | 15 October 1941 | 07:35 | I-26 (Yak-1) | |
| 2 | 24 June 1941 | 07:30 | DB-3 | Constanța | 15 | 24 October 1941 | 12:44 | I-15 | |
| 3 | 26 June 1941 | 05:20 | DB-3 | Constanța | 16 | 24 October 1941 | 16:19 | I-16 | |
| 4 | 4 August 1941 | 05:55 | I-16 | | 17 | 31 October 1941 | 11:27 | I-153 | |
| 5 | 4 August 1941 | 06:10 | I-16 | Kiev | 18 | 9 November 1941 | 13:53 | I-26 (Yak-1) | |
| 6 | 9 August 1941 | 05:42 | SB-2 | | 19 | 9 November 1941 | 13:55 | Su-2 (Seversky) | |
| 7 | 17 August 1941 | 13:30 | I-15 | | 20 | 9 November 1941 | 14:02 | V-11 (Il-2) | |
| 8 | 30 August 1941 | 15:17 | DB-3 | east of Dnepropetrovsk | 21 | 22 November 1941 | 13:45 | I-61 (MiG-3) | |
| 9 | 6 September 1941 | 12:58 | R-10 (Seversky) | north of Kremenchuk | 22 | 28 November 1941 | 10:28 | I-61 (MiG-3) | northwest of Rostov |
| 10 | 25 September 1941 | 07:30 | I-26 (Yak-1) | | 23 | 28 November 1941 | 10:30 | I-61 (MiG-3) | northwest of Rostov |
| 11 | 26 September 1941 | 12:30 | I-16 | | 24 | 29 November 1941 | 07:25 | I-61 (MiG-3) | |
| 12 | 27 September 1941 | 10:50 | DB-3 | 3 km (1.9 mi) east of Skorochadowo | 25 | 5 December 1941 | 10:08 | I-16 | |
| 13 | 28 September 1941 | 07:55 | SB-2 | east-southeast of Poltava | | | | | |
– 8. Staffel of Jagdgeschwader 52 – Eastern Front — 6 December 1941 – 28 April 1942
| 26 | 6 December 1941 | 08:30 | I-16 | | 37 | 22 February 1942 | 15:40 | I-26 (Yak-1) | |
| 27 | 7 December 1941 | 13:51 | I-16 | | 38 | 22 February 1942 | 15:44 | V-11 (Il-2) | |
| 28 | 7 December 1941 | 13:55 | I-16 | | 39 | 1 March 1942 | 11:42 | I-26 (Yak-1) | |
| 29 | 9 December 1941 | 12:31 | I-15 | | 40 | 1 March 1942 | 11:45 | I-26 (Yak-1) | |
| 30 | 9 December 1941 | 12:33 | I-15 | | 41 | 9 March 1942 | 12:35 | I-61 (MiG-3) | |
| 31 | 9 December 1941 | 12:35 | I-15 | | 42 | 9 March 1942 | 12:40 | I-61 (MiG-3) | |
| 32 | 11 December 1941 | 13:35 | SB-2 | | 43 | 17 March 1942 | 14:28 | I-61 (MiG-3) | |
| 33 | 11 December 1941 | 13:38 | SB-2 | | 44 | 18 March 1942 | 12:28 | SB-2 | |
| 34 | 15 January 1942 | 09:35 | I-153 | | 45 | 18 March 1942 | 16:38 | I-153 | |
| 35 | 15 January 1942 | 09:40 | I-153 | | 46 | 7 April 1942 | 13:10 | I-61 (MiG-3) | |
| 36 | 22 February 1942 | 15:38 | Pe-2 | | | | | | |
– 8. Staffel of Jagdgeschwader 52 – Eastern Front — 29 April – November 1942
| 47 | 29 April 1942 | 16:50 | I-61 (MiG-3) | | 67 | 26 August 1942 | 17:02 | MiG-1 | PQ 44423 |
| 48 | 30 April 1942 | 14:30 | I-61 (MiG-3) | | 68 | 26 August 1942 | 17:04? (Note: According to Mathews and Foreman claimed at 17:06.) | MiG-1 | PQ 44472 south of Mozdok |
| 49 | 1 May 1942 | 05:05 | I-61 (MiG-3) | 3 km (1.9 mi) east of Sety (Saly) | 69 | 28 August 1942 | 14:00 | MiG-1 | PQ 44451 vicinity of Mozdok |
| 50 | 2 May 1942 | 08:55 | U-2 | | 70 | 29 August 1942 | 17:00 | I-16 | PQ 44363 north of Nizhnii Kurp |
| 51 | 2 May 1942 | 12:43 | I-26 (Yak-1) | | 71 | 5 September 1942 | 06:22 | LaGG-3 | PQ 49454 vicinity of Wosnessnokaja |
| 52 | 8 May 1942 | 11:12 | I-153 | | 72 | 7 September 1942 | 08:43 | LaGG-3 | PQ 44454, south of Mozdok |
| 53 | 8 May 1942 | 13:20 | I-153 | | 73 | 7 September 1942 | 08:47 | Pe-2 | PQ 44454, south of Mozdok |
| 54 | 13 May 1942 | 09:08 | MiG-1 | | 74 | 8 September 1942 | 06:37? (Note: According to Mathews and Foreman claimed at 06:35.) | LaGG-3 | PQ 44477 |
| 55 | 13 May 1942 | 09:12 | MiG-1 | | 75 | 14 September 1942 | 11:32 | MiG-1 | PQ 44513 |
| 56 | 13 May 1942 | 13:15 | MiG-1 | | 76 | 17 September 1942 | 14:28 | Su-2 (Seversky) | PQ 54322 |
| 57 | 13 May 1942 | 13:18 | MiG-1 | | 77 | 21 September 1942 | 16:25 | MiG-3 | PQ 44554 |
| 58♠ | 14 May 1942 | 08:10 | MiG-1 | | 78 | 21 September 1942 | 16:28 | MiG-3 | PQ 44524 |
| 59♠ | 14 May 1942 | 08:16 | MiG-1 | | 79 | 26 September 1942 | 14:42 | MiG-1 | PQ 44472 south of Mozdok |
| 60♠ | 14 May 1942 | 09:37 | MiG-1 | | 80 | 26 September 1942 | 14:46 | MiG-1 | PQ 44323 vicinity of Malgobek |
| 61♠ | 14 May 1942 | 09:44 | MiG-1 | | 81 | 6 November 1942 | 11:22 | LaGG-3 | PQ 44871 |
| 62♠ | 14 May 1942 | 12:07 | MiG-1 | | 82 | 7 November 1942 | 11:03 | Il-2 | PQ 44843 |
| 63 | 22 June 1942 | 05:10 | LaGG-3 | | 83 | 7 November 1942 | 14:03 | Il-2 | PQ 44813 |
| 64 | 23 June 1942 | 14:48 | MiG-1 | | 84 | 7 November 1942 | 14:08 | Il-2 | PQ 44752, south of Salugardan |
| 65 | 25 August 1942 | 15:30 | I-153 | PQ 44273 | 85 | 27 November 1942 | 11:15 | Il-2 | PQ 44762 |
| 66 | 25 August 1942 | 15:35 | I-153 | PQ 44244 | 86 | 29 November 1942 | 13:34 | MiG-3 | 4 km (2.5 mi) northeast of Ardonskaya |
– 7. Staffel of Jagdgeschwader 52 – Eastern Front — May 1944
| 87 | 6 May 1944 | 09:04? (Note: According to Mathews and Foreman claimed at 09:40.) | Il-2 m.H. (Note: The "m.H." refers to an Ilyushin Il-2 with rear gunner (mit Heckschütze).) | PQ 35442 vicinity of Sevastopol | 89 | 29 May 1944 | 08:58 | Pe-2 | PQ 68724; 30 km (19 mi) north-northwest of Piatra Neamț |
| 88 | 7 May 1944 | 07:25? (Note: According to Mathews and Foreman claimed at 08:35.) | Yak-9 | PQ 35611; Black Sea, 10 km (6.2 mi) south of Sevastopol | | | | | |

=== Awards ===
- Iron Cross (1939) 2nd and 1st Class
- Honor Goblet of the Luftwaffe on 15 December 1941 as Unteroffizier and pilot
- German Cross in Gold on 22 January 1942 as Unteroffizier in the III./Jagdgeschwader 52
- Knight's Cross of the Iron Cross on 5 April 1942 as Unteroffizier and pilot in the III./Jagdgeschwader 52 (Note: According to Scherzer as pilot in the 8./Jagdgeschwader 52.)
