= Loukhi-3 (air base) =

- IATA: none; ICAO: XLPL

Summary
- Airport type: Military(?)
- Location: Loukhi
- Elevation AMSL: 328 ft / 100 m
- Coordinates: 66°3′18″N 032°47′48″E
- Interactive map of Loukhi-3

Runways
Direction	Length		Surface
Direction	ft	m	Surface
	7,874	2,400	Concrete

Loukhi-3 is an air base in the Republic of Karelia, Russia located 11 kilometres (6.8 mi) west of Loukhi. It is a minor airstrip with only turnarounds and a 400-meter central taxiway.

Loukhi had some use during World War II and probably maintained forward fighter deployments in the 1950s and 1960s.
