= Seiersberg-Pirka =

- Municipality
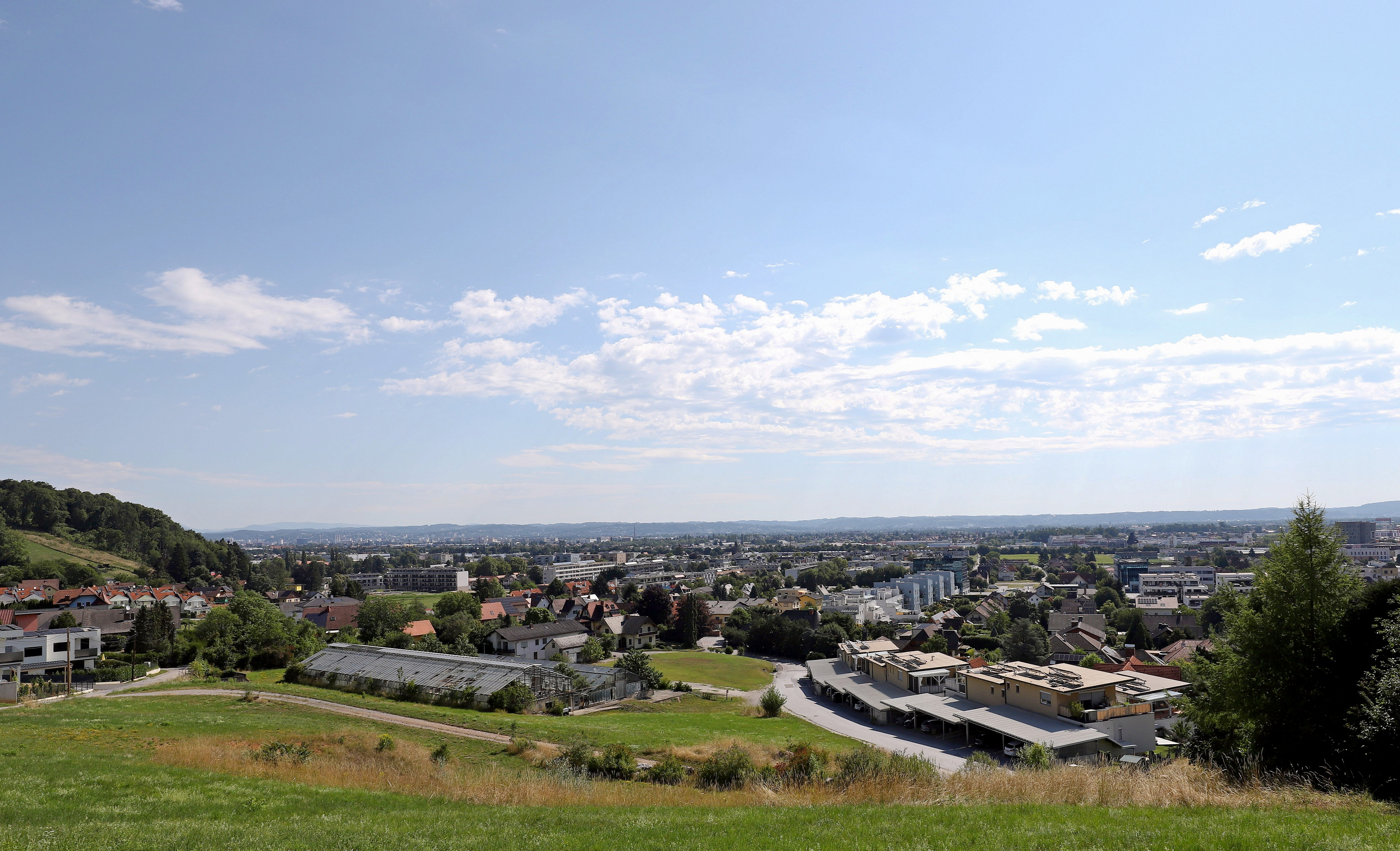

- Coat of arms

- Location within Austria
- Coordinates: 47°00′36″N 15°23′56″E
- Country: Austria
- State: Styria
- District: Graz-Umgebung

Government
  - Mayor: Werner Baumann

Area
  - Total: 17.32 km^{2} (6.69 sq mi)
- Elevation: 350 m (1,150 ft)

Population (2018-01-01)
  - Total: 11,187
  - Density: 645.9/km^{2} (1,673/sq mi)
- Time zone: UTC+1 (CET)
  - Summer (DST): UTC+2 (CEST)
- Postal code: 8054, 8055, 8073, 8144
- Area code: 0316
- Website: www.gemeindekurier.at

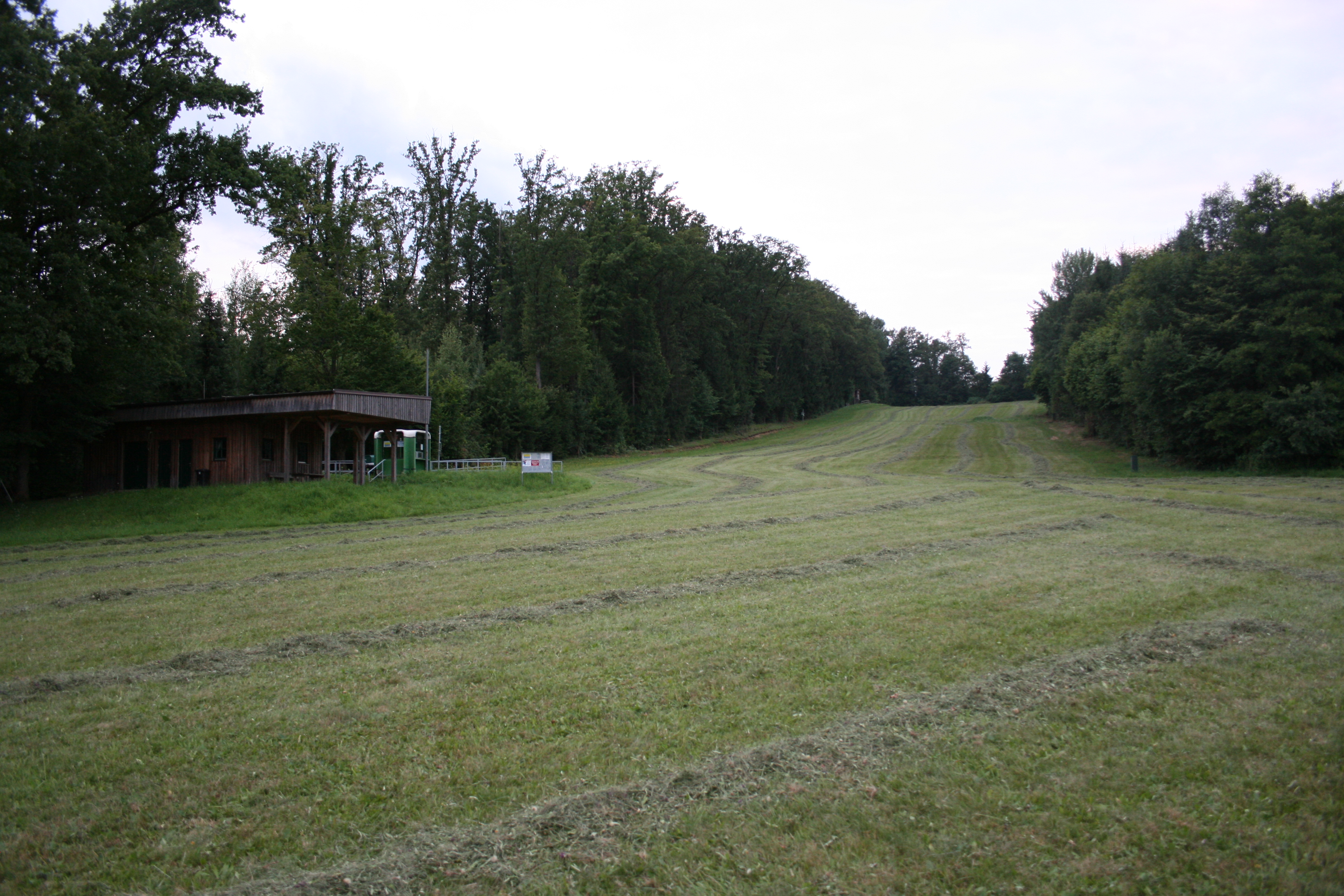
The Skilift, at Seiersberg (summer view)

Seiersberg-Pirka is a municipality with 12,112 residents (as of 1 January 2023), and after Gratwein-Straßengel, the 2nd-largest municipality of Graz-Umgebung District in Styria, Austria.

It was created as part of the Styria municipal structural reform, at the end of 2014, by merging the former independent towns Seiersberg und Pirka.

== Geography ==
=== Geographical layout ===
The municipality borders at north to the capital city, Graz; Seiersberg-Pirka lies southwest of Graz and has grown together with it. The town lies mainly in Grazer Becken basin in Weststeiermark.

=== Municipality arrangement ===
The municipality territory includes the following six sections (populations as of January 2023):

- Bischofegg (103)
- Neupirka (181)
- Neuwindorf (368)
- Pirka (2427)
- Seiersberg (8230) including Neuseiersberg and Gedersberg
- Windorf (803)

The municipal area covers two Katastralgemeinden:

- Pirka-Eggenberg (942.73 ha or 2,329.5 acres)
- Seiersberg (792.66 ha or 1,958.7 acres)

== Economy and infrastructure ==
Seiersberg-Pirka is one of the richest communities in Austria due to the proximity to Graz. The shopping area of Seiersberg, is the second-largest shopping center in Austria, and a large number of commercial zones are located in the municipal area. The community is connected to the Pyhrn highway A 9 through the junction at Seiersberg. In addition, the municipality by bus lines is composite to Graz-Köflach Railway and bus operation and the Holding Graz (GVB) opened up.

== Safety ==
In Seiersberg-Pirka, the District Police Command of Graz-Umgebung is located, together with the connected Polizeiinspektion and area control center. The police are locally responsible for the municipality Seiersberg-Pirka and for cadastral Mantscha of the municipality Hitzendorf.

== Culture and sights ==
The Schloßberg-Schattenturm tower, in a roundabout at the motorway junction, which was located behind the clock tower on the occasion of the capital of culture in 2003, was sold to the municipality and set up there.

== Politics ==
Until the municipal elections in 2015, the municipality was led by the former mayor of Seiersberg, Werner Baumann (SPÖ) as government commissioner, supported by the former mayor of Pirka, Thomas Göttfried (SPÖ) and the former second mayor of Seiersberg, Günter Grain. Since the election in 2015, Werner Baumann (SPÖ) is mayor.

=== Coat of arms ===

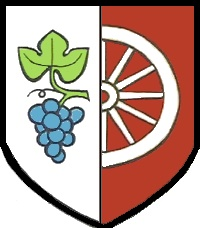
Seiersberg

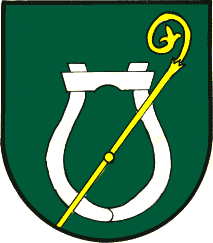
Pirka

Both former towns had a town crest. By way of the merger, they lost their official validity on 1 January 2015. The authorization of the new crest for the fusion community followed into effect on 23 September 2016.
The blazon reads:

"In a four-part shield, at upper right on silver the black vine, with blue grapes and green leaves, hanging from the dividing line, a silvery twelfth bishop's staff growing from the dividing line, at lower left growing a silver twelve-spoke cartwheel on red, at lower right on silver a black ox yoke."

== Notable people ==
In the town Windorf lived the Renner-Buben, part of an artist-family and airship pilots.
