= Seiersberg =

- Former municipality
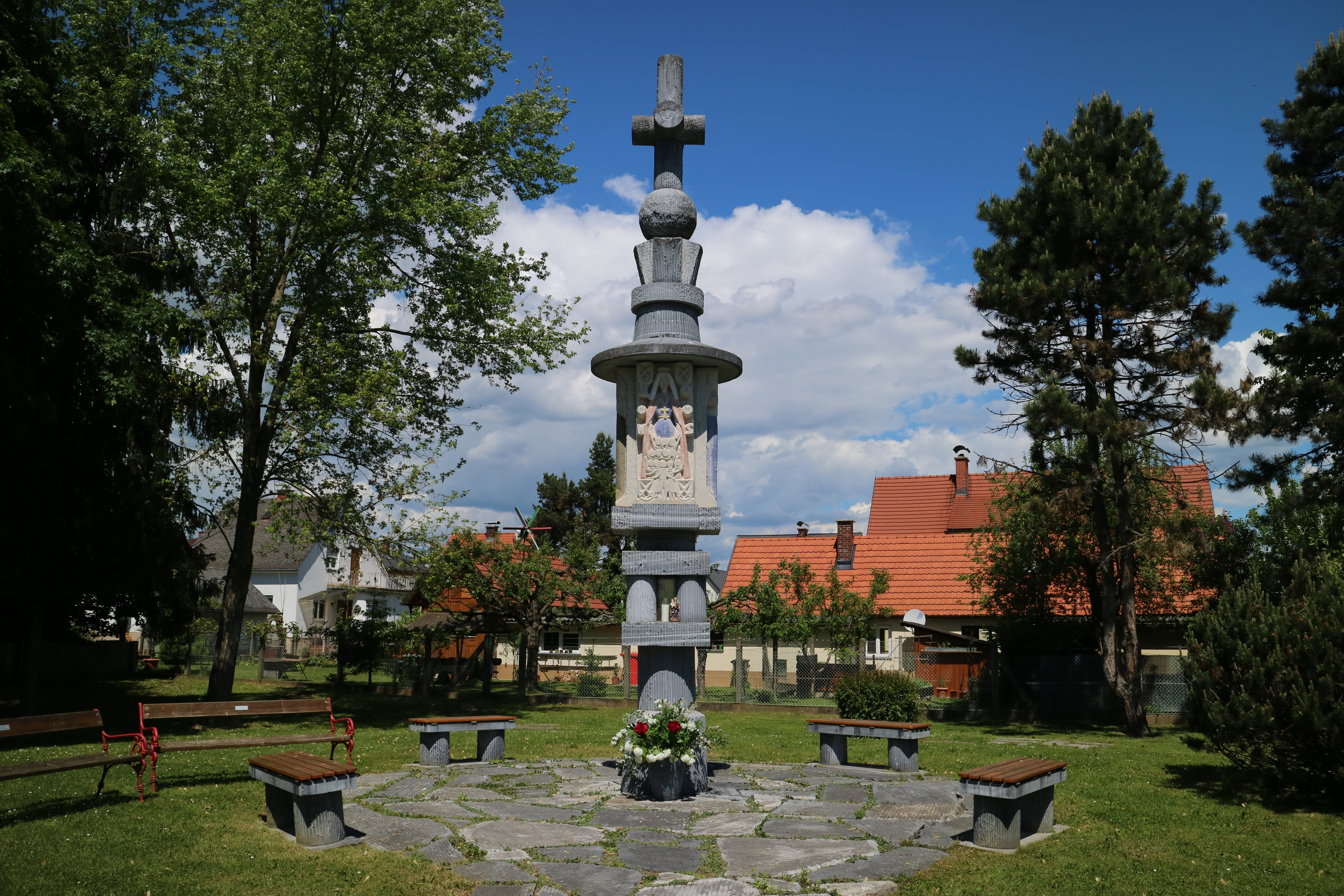
- Sandgrubenmadonna monument in Seiersberg

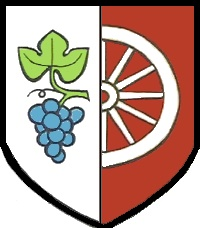
- Coat of arms

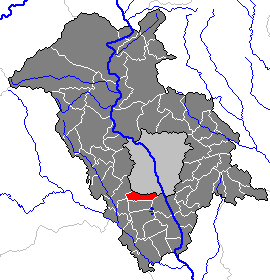
- Location within Graz-Umgebung district

- Location within Austria
- Coordinates: 47°00′36″N 15°23′56″E
- Country: Austria
- State: Styria
- District: Graz-Umgebung

Area
  - Total: 7.89 km^{2} (3.05 sq mi)
- Elevation: 350 m (1,150 ft)

Population (2015-01-01)
  - Total: 7,351
  - Density: 932/km^{2} (2,410/sq mi)
- Time zone: UTC+1 (CET)
  - Summer (DST): UTC+2 (CEST)
- Postal code: 8054, 8055, 8073
- Area code: 0316
- Vehicle registration: GU
- Website: www.seiersberg.at

Seiersberg is a former municipality in the district of Graz-Umgebung in the Austrian state of Styria. Since the 2015 Styria municipal structural reform, it is part of the municipality Seiersberg-Pirka.

== Population ==
Historical population
Year	Pop.	±%
1869	629	—
1880	631	+0.3%
1890	617	−2.2%
1900	662	+7.3%
1910	949	+43.4%
1923	1,047	+10.3%
1934	1,658	+58.4%
1939	2,011	+21.3%
1951	2,345	+16.6%
1961	3,391	+44.6%
1971	3,867	+14.0%
1981	3,928	+1.6%
1991	4,727	+20.3%
2001	5,950	+25.9%
2011	7,293	+22.6%
2015	7,351	+0.8%
